= Herbert S. Eleuterio =

American industrial chemist (1927–2022)

Herbert Sousa Eleuterio
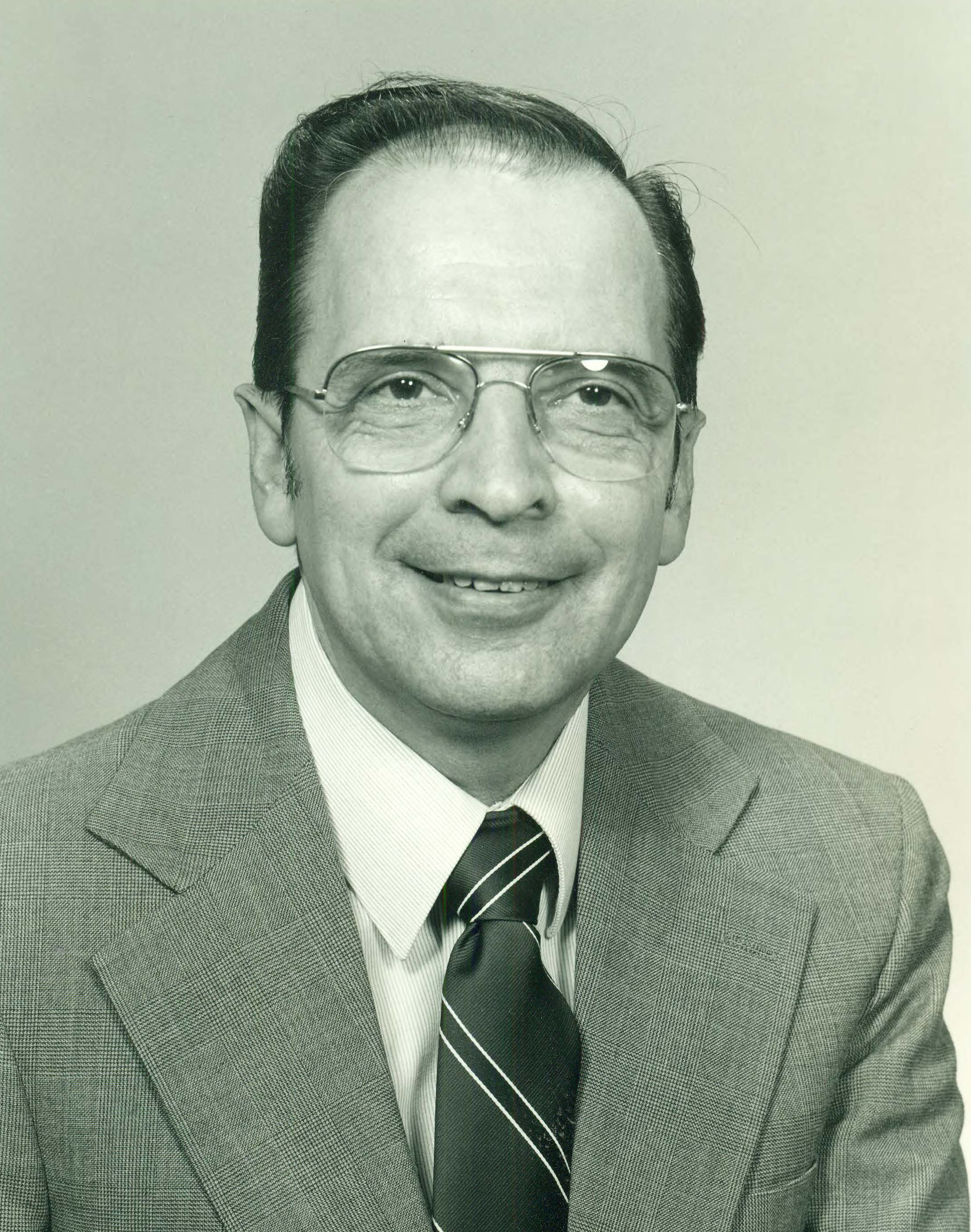
- Born: November 23, 1927; New Bedford, Massachusetts
- Died: July 17, 2022 (aged 94); Wilmington, Delaware
- Citizenship: United States
- Education: B.S., Tufts University, 1949; Ph.D., Michigan State University 1953
- Known for: Discovery of olefin metathesis New fluoropolymers Research leadership
- Spouse: Marianne Eleuterio
- Awards: Lavoisier Medal for Technical Achievement
- Scientific career
- Institutions: DuPont Co. National University of Singapore
- Doctoral advisor: Harold Hart

Herbert S. Eleuterio (November 23, 1927 – July 17, 2022) was an American industrial chemist noted for technical contributions to catalysis, polymerization, industrial research management, and science education. In particular, he discovered the olefin metathesis reaction and several novel fluoropolymers. Additionally, he explored techniques for research leadership, especially methods for fostering collaboration, globalization, and scientific creativity.

Eleuterio's discovery of olefin metathesis is cited as a compelling example of a scientific development originating in industry, subsequently being nurtured by academia, and returning to industry in commercially viable form.

== Early life and education ==
Eleuterio was born in New Bedford, Massachusetts, to parents of Portuguese descent. He completed a B.S. in Chemistry at Tufts University in 1949. He continued on to graduate school at Michigan State University, pursuing physical organic chemistry. As part of his thesis research with his Ph.D. advisor Harold Hart, Eleuterio conducted fundamental mechanistic studies on important organic reactions such as nucleophilic aromatic substitution. While in graduate school, he married the future Marianne Eleuterio (née Kingsbury) who later became a genetics professor at West Chester University. After completing his doctoral thesis in 1953, Eleuterio pursued post-doctoral research in synthetic organic chemistry at the Ohio State University, working in the laboratories of Melvin S. Newman. He subsequently joined the research staff at the DuPont Co.'s Experimental Station in 1954.

== Industrial career ==
Working in the Petrochemicals Department of the DuPont Co. in 1957, Eleuterio discovered that certain catalysts convert propylene to a mixture containing ethylene and butene, a reaction he recognized as olefin metathesis. In follow-up experimentation, Eleuterio demonstrated that cyclic olefins such as norbornene and cyclopentene could be polymerized to linear polymer, a reaction since dubbed ring-opening metathesis polymerization, as claimed in a patent first filed in 1957. Eleuterio's discovery resulted from a fundamental investigation of propylene polymerization using a molybdena-on-alumina catalyst modified with metal hydrides. This experimental designed yielded an ethylene-propylene co-polymer together with ethylene and butene by-products rather than the expected polypropylene. He then extended his experimentation to internal olefins and cyclic olefins, substances that are not normally polymerized by could serve as olefin metathesis substrates. Many researchers followed on Eleuterio's initial discovery, culminating in the 2005 Nobel Prize to Chauvin, Grubbs, and Schrock for the development of olefin metathesis for organic synthesis. Nobel Laureates Grubbs and Schrock honored Eleuterio for his discovery of olefin metathesis.

Eleuterio subsequently worked on preparation of novel fluoropolymers. He discovered that hexafluoropropylene could be co-polymerized with tetrafluoroethylene to yield amorphous fluorinated ethylene propylene co-polymers with good characteristics as films. These are a class of fluoropolymers today known generically as FEP, and Eleuterio's findings were on co-polymers that contained 50 to 100% hexafluoropropylene.

Eleuterio also worked on epoxidation of hexafluoropropylene, finding a practical synthesis of hexafluoropropylene oxide using hydrogen peroxide anion. He carried out pioneering research on oligomerization of hexafluoropropylene oxide to make fluorinated lubricating oils. These findings ultimately proved important in the development of fluorinated ionomers such as Nafion.

Beginning in 1959, Eleuterio held a series of management posts, mostly in research management. Managerial positions he held were related to polymer intermediates, explosives, atomic energy and long-range research. From 1985 to 1989, Eleuterio was the Technical Director of the U.S. Government's Savannah River atomic energy facility in Aiken, South Carolina, which was managed by the DuPont Co. under government contract. During this period, Eleuterio was instrumental in the founding of the Ruth Patrick Science Education Center. He also served on the Council for Chemical Research, which he chaired in 1990.

== Academic career ==
Following his 1992 retirement from the DuPont Co., Eleuterio became a visiting professor at the National University of Singapore, teaching part-time. At the university, he continued to pursue his interests in globalization of R&D and the fundamental nature of the creative process as it relates to science and technology. He taught courses on managing research and development, typically with master's degree students in engineering, science, and business. He founded the Process Analysis and Optimization Enterprise, which was the forerunner of the university's Center for Process Engineering.

== Awards and honors ==
- 1987 Chemical Pioneer Award by the American Institute of Chemists
- 1995 Lavoisier Medal for Technical Achievement
- 1995 Carothers Award of the Delaware Section of the American Chemical Society
- 2007 Malcolm E. Pruitt Award for contributions to science education
