= Xylan (coating) =

Non-stick material

Xylan is a fluoropolymer-based industrial coating, most commonly used in non-stick cookware. Generally, it is applied in a thin film to the target material to improve its durability and non-stick properties.

== Development ==
Consumer demand for non-stick coatings with improved durability drove research in the 1960s. DuPont, at that time focused on improving housewares, developed important properties of nonstick coatings through research. DuPont scientists found that adding Fluorinated ethylene propylene to the hard, adhesion-promoting binder resins produced one-coat products that were more durable than earlier Teflon formulations. In 1969, when Xylan was under developed, Tefal and Teflon accounted for nearly all of the fluoropolymer coatings industry.

== Applications ==
Xylan is generally used to reduce friction, improve wear resistance, and for non-stick applications. Additionally, it can be used to protect a metal from corrosion. The most commonly known application is in non-stick cookware but Xylan coatings have also been used extensively in the automotive industry and for corrosion protection in the oil and gas industry.

Xylan is the umbrella trademark for most of the Whitford Corporation fluoropolymer coatings line. Xylan is made of low friction, wear resistant composites of fluoropolymers and reinforcing binder resins. Xylan coatings can be one-, two- (primer and top-coat), and three- (primer, mid-coat, top-coat) coat conventional and reinforced (filled) coating systems.

The fluoropolymers utilized in Xylan coatings consist of PTFE, PFA, and FEP. The properties listed below may not apply to all Xylan coatings as the fluoropolymer and resin content and type can have significant effects on each property.

== Properties ==
Xylan coating properties
Parameter	Test Standard	CGS Vaue	SI Value
Tensile Strength	ASTM D1708	4000 – 5000 psi	27.58–34.47 MPa
Elongation	ASTM D4894	50%	50%
Impact Strength	ASTM D256	13 ft – lb/in	
Hardness	ASTM D2240	60 – 90 HB (shore D)	
Abrasion Resistance	TABER	> 15 mg	-
Coefficient of Friction	ASTM D1894	.15 – .35 static	
Dielectric Strength	ASTM D149	1400 volts/mil	55118 kV/m
Use Temperature	-	−100 °F to 500 °F max	−73.3 °C to 260 °C
Melting Point	-	n/a	n/a
Thermal conductivity	-	n/a	n/a
Chemical Resistance	ASTM D543	Good	Good
Salt Spray Resistance	ASTM B117	Excellent	Excellent
Water Absorption	ASTM D570	< .03 %	< .03 %
Thickness	-	.0008" - .002"	20.32 - 50.8 μm

== See also ==
- Chameleon coating
