= Perfluoroether =

Perfluoroethers are a class of organofluorine compound containing one or more ether functional group. In general these compounds are structurally analogous to the related hydrocarbon ethers, except for the distinctive properties of fluorocarbons.

The introduction of an ether function to a perfluoro-polymer chain also provides thermoplastic properties to the polymer, making thermal forming possible. This is a great technological advantage for producing a large variety of shapes (e.g., beakers, funnels, flasks for laboratory uses, etc...) and allows extrusion of highly chemically-resistant tubing. It also confers on the polymer a translucent appearance.

== Low molecular weight fluorinated ethers ==
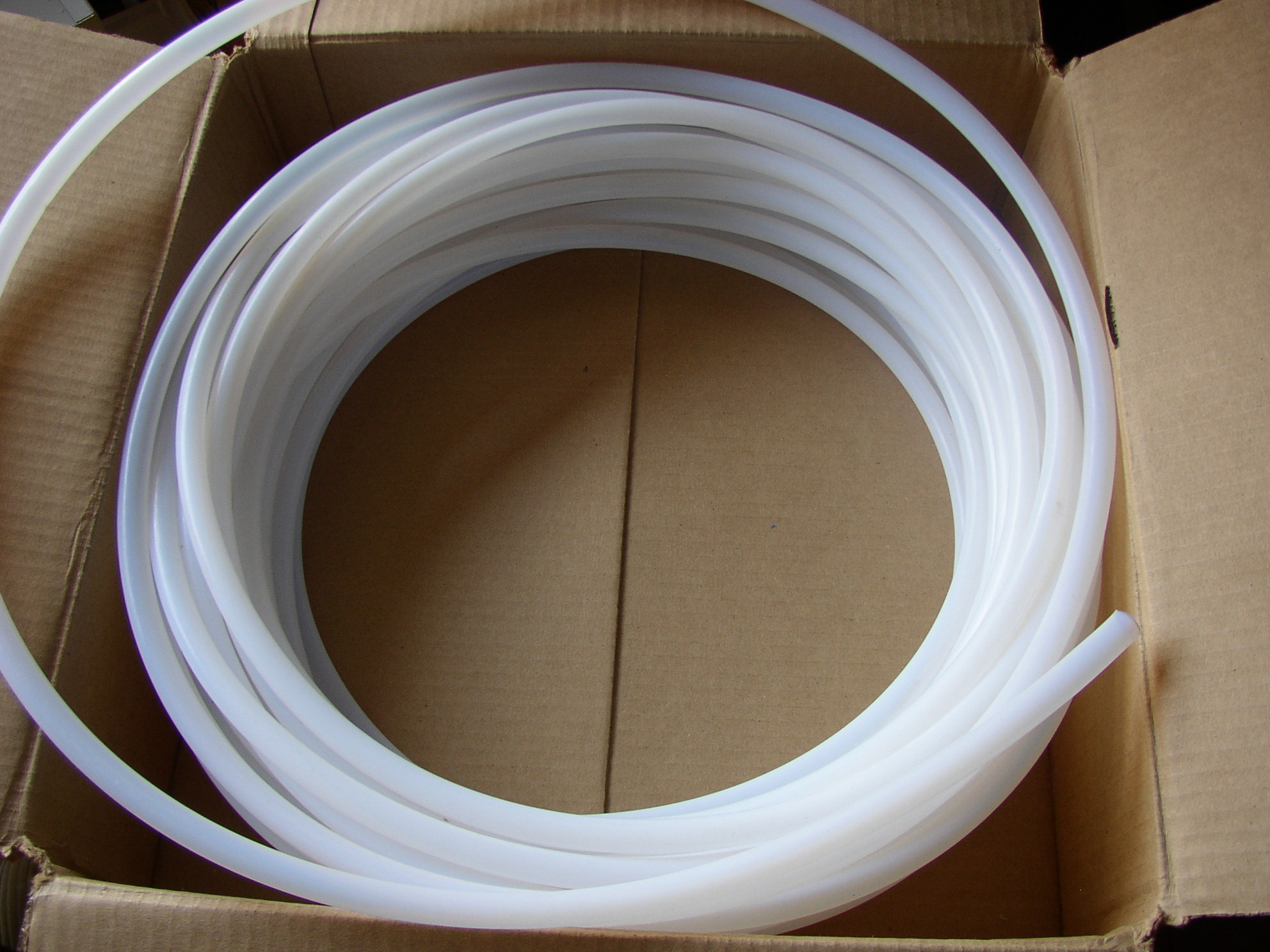
PFA tubing is commonly used to handle aggressive chemicals

Nafion is a fluoroether with strongly acidic sulfonic acid substituents

Acyclic perfluoroethers are analogues of diethylether, e.g. O(C_{2}F_{5})_{2}, such perfluoro(2-ethoxyethane)sulfonic acid (PFEESA).

Of practical utility are the fluorinated epoxides. Tetrafluoroethylene oxide and hexafluoropropylene oxide. These are precursors of perfluoro(methyl vinyl ether) (CF_{2}=CFOCF_{3}) and perfluoro(propyl vinyl ether), and are used as comonomers with tetrafluoroethylene, where they improve the properties of the resulting polytetrafluoroethylene (e.g., Teflon).

== Polymeric perfluoroethers ==
Perfluoroalkoxy alkanes (PFAs) are fluoropolymers with properties similar to polytetrafluoroethylene (PTFE). Methylfluoroalkoxy (MFA) is a polytetrafluoroethylene perfluoro methylvinylether prepared with a different ratio of PTFE and MVE monomers to that used for PFA. In these materials, the ether groups are pendant from the polymer backbone.

Krytox is a grease generated by the polymerization of hexafluoropropylene oxide. Its chemical formula is F−(CF(CF_{3})−CF_{2}−O)_{n}−CF_{2}CF_{3}. The ether groups are integral to the polymer chain.

Nafion is a perfluorinated polyether with pendant sulfonic acid groups (RSO_{3}H).

== Precautions ==
At high temperatures or in a fire, perfluoroethers decompose and may release hydrogen fluoride. Any residue must be handled using protective equipment.
