= C3F6O =

The molecular formula C_{3}F_{6}O (molar mass: 166.02 g/mol, exact mass: 165.9853 u) may refer to:

- Hexafluoroacetone (HFA)
- Hexafluoropropylene oxide (HFPO)
- Perfluoro(methyl vinyl ether)
