= GenX =

Trademark name for a synthetic, organofluorine chemical compound

GenX is a Chemours trademark name for a synthetic, short-chain organofluorine chemical compound, the ammonium salt of hexafluoropropylene oxide dimer acid (HFPO-DA). It can also be used more informally to refer to the group of related fluorochemicals that are used to produce GenX. DuPont began the commercial development of GenX in 2009 as a replacement for perfluorooctanoic acid (PFOA, also known as C8), in response to legal action due to the health effects and ecotoxicity of PFOA.

Although GenX was designed to be less persistent in the environment compared to PFOA, its effects may be equally harmful or even more detrimental than those of the chemical it was meant to replace.

GenX is one of many synthetic organofluorine compounds collectively known as per- and polyfluoroalkyl substances (PFASs).

== Uses ==
The chemicals are used in products such as food packaging, paints, cleaning products, non-stick coatings, outdoor fabrics and firefighting foam. The chemicals are manufactured by Chemours, a corporate spin-off of DuPont, in Fayetteville, North Carolina.

GenX chemicals are used as replacements for PFOA for manufacturing fluoropolymers such as Teflon, the GenX chemicals serve as surfactants and processing aids in the fluoropolymer production process to lower the surface tension allowing the polymer particles to grow larger. The GenX chemicals are then removed from the final polymer by chemical treatment and heating.

== Chemistry ==
The manufacturing process combines two molecules of hexafluoropropylene oxide (HFPO) to form HFPO-DA. HFPO-DA is converted into its ammonium salt that is the official GenX compound.

The chemical process uses 2,3,3,3-tetrafluoro-2-(heptafluoropropoxy)propanoic acid (FRD-903) to generate ammonium 2,3,3,3-tetrafluoro-2-(heptafluoropropoxy)propanoate (FRD-902) and heptafluoropropyl 1,2,2,2-tetrafluoroethyl ether (E1).

When GenX contacts water, it releases the ammonium group to become HFPO-DA. Because HFPO-DA is a strong acid, it deprotonates into its conjugate base, which can then be detected in the water.

== Pollution ==
In North Carolina, the Chemours Fayetteville plant released GenX compounds into the Cape Fear River, which is a drinking water source for the Wilmington area. A documentary film, The Devil We Know; a fictional dramatization, Dark Waters; and a nonfiction memoir, Exposure: Poisoned Water, Corporate Greed, and One Lawyer's Twenty-Year Battle Against DuPont by Robert Bilott, subsequently publicized the discharges, leading to controversy over possible health effects.

HFPO-DA was first reported to be in the Cape Fear River in 2012 and an additional eleven polyfluoroalkyl substances (PFAS) were reported 2014. These results were published as a formal paper in 2015. The following year, North Carolina State University and the EPA jointly published a study demonstrating HFPO-DA and other PFAS were present in the Wilmington-area drinking water sourced from the Cape Fear river.

In September 2017, the North Carolina Department of Environmental Quality (NCDEQ) ordered Chemours to halt discharges of all fluorinated compounds into the river. Following a chemical spill one month later, NCDEQ cited Chemours for violating provisions in its National Pollutant Discharge Elimination System wastewater discharge permit. In November 2017, the Brunswick County Government filed a federal lawsuit alleging that DuPont failed to disclose research regarding potential risks from the chemical.

In spring 2018, Cape Fear River Watch sued Chemours for Clean Water Act violations and sued the NCDEQ for inaction. After Cape Fear River Watch's suits were filed, NCDEQ filed a suit against Chemours, the result of all 3 lawsuits culminated in a consent order. The order signed by all 3 parties requires Chemours drastically reduce PFAS containing water discharges and air emissions, as well as sampling and filtration for well owners with contaminated wells, among other requirements. All materials relative to status of consent order requirements must be published to a public website. One requirement under the order was for non-targeted analysis which found 257 "unknown" PFAS being released from Fayetteville Works, (aside from the 100 'known' PFAS which can be quantified. Cape Fear River Watch published that their research of the NC DEQ permit file indicates that the first PFAS byproducts were likely released from Fayetteville Works in 1976 with the production of Nafion which uses HFPO in production (otherwise known as GenX) and creates byproducts termed Nafion Byproducts 1 through 5, some of which have been found in the blood of Cape Fear area residents.

In 2020 Michigan adopted drinking water standards for 5 previously unregulated PFAS compounds including HFPO-DA which has a maximum contaminant level (MCL) of 370 parts per trillion (ppt). Two previously regulated PFAS compounds PFOA and PFOS had their acceptable limits lowered to 8 ppt and 16 ppt respectively.

In 2022 Virginia's Roanoke River had become contaminated by GenX at levels reported to be 1.3 million parts per trillion.

== Health effects ==
GenX has been shown to cause a variety of adverse health effects. While it was originally marketed as a safer alternative to legacy PFAS, research suggests that GenX poses significant health risks similar to those associated with its predecessor.

In 2023, the Court of Justice of the European Union confirmed in a ruling that 2,3,3,3-tetrafluoro-2-(heptafluoropropoxy)propionic acid, its salts and its acyl halides (including FRD-902) should be classified as a substance of concern and included in Annex XIV of the REACH Regulation.

=== Liver and kidney toxicity ===
Studies have demonstrated that the liver is especially vulnerable to GenX exposure. Animal research has shown that even low doses of GenX can cause liver enlargement and damage. Similarly, the kidneys are also sensitive to GenX, with chronic exposure leading to renal toxicity. These effects highlight the potential dangers of prolonged exposure to even small amounts of the chemical.

=== Cancer risk ===
There is increasing concern about the carcinogenic potential of GenX. Research in animal models has linked exposure to various cancers, including liver, pancreatic, and testicular cancers. Although data on humans are limited, the results from these studies have prompted further investigation into the possible cancer risks posed by GenX.

=== Neurotoxicity and developmental effects ===
Two 2023 studies have identified potential neurotoxic effects of GenX, particularly during critical developmental windows. Pre-differentiation exposure of human dopaminergic-like neurons (SH-SY5Y cells) to low-dose GenX (0.4 and 4 μg/L) resulted in persistent alterations in neuronal characteristics. The study reported significant changes in nuclear morphology, chromatin arrangement, and increased expression of the repressive marker H3K27me3, which is associated with neurodegeneration.

These changes were accompanied by disruptions in mitochondrial function and an increase in intracellular calcium levels, which are critical markers of neuronal health. Notably, GenX exposure led to altered expression of α-synuclein, a protein closely linked to the development of Parkinson's disease. The findings suggest that developmental exposure to GenX may pose a long-term risk for neurodegenerative disorders, particularly Parkinson's disease, due to its impact on key neuronal processes.

A 2024 study in Environmental Science & Technology further investigated GenX neurotoxicity using Drosophila melanogaster and astrocyte models. The authors reported motor deficits and proteomic changes in GenX-exposed fly brains, including alterations in pathways related to metabolism, immune signaling, and GABA-associated processes. Follow-up experiments in astrocytes suggested that GenX exposure may impair mitochondrial function and promote neuroinflammatory responses, providing a possible glial mechanism linking GenX exposure to nervous-system effects.

Recent research has also underscored the potential for GenX to disrupt glucose and lipid metabolism during critical developmental periods. A 2021 study published in Environment International investigated the effects of prenatal exposure to GenX in Sprague-Dawley rats, revealing significant maternal and neonatal adverse outcomes, such as increased maternal liver weight, altered lipid profiles, and reduced glycogen accumulation in neonatal livers, resulting in hypoglycemia. Additionally, neonatal mortality and lower birth weights were observed at higher doses of GenX .

A 2024 study in Science of the Total Environment expanded upon these findings in mice, demonstrating that gestational exposure to GenX led to increased liver weight, elevated liver enzyme levels (e.g., ALT and AST), and decreased glycogen storage capacity in the liver. Disruptions in gut flora and the intestinal mucosal barrier were also noted, further linking GenX exposure to hepatotoxicity.

Both studies revealed significant alterations in gene expression, particularly in pathways regulating glucose and lipid metabolism. Genes such as CYP4A14, Sult2a1, and Igfbp1 were upregulated, which may have long-term implications for metabolic health. These findings suggest that gestational GenX exposure could trigger metabolic disorders and liver toxicity, posing potential health risks for populations exposed to GenX through contaminated water sources .

=== Immune system and metabolic effects ===
Studies have demonstrated that exposure to GenX, a replacement for long-chain PFAS chemicals, can lead to complex health effects. GenX has been linked to alterations in immune responses and metabolic processes, as observed in both human and animal studies. For instance, in a study using Monodelphis domestica, GenX exposure upregulated genes associated with inflammation and fatty acid transport. Another study on mice showed that GenX suppressed innate immune responses to inhaled carbon black nanoparticles, while simultaneously promoting lung cell proliferation, including macrophages and epithelial cells. These findings suggest that GenX may have immunosuppressive effects, potentially increasing susceptibility to respiratory agents while encouraging cellular growth in the lungs, raising concerns about respiratory health risks.

This research highlights the potential health implications of GenX exposure, particularly its impact on immune system function and cell proliferation, which may contribute to both immune suppression and adverse health outcomes like inflammation or respiratory diseases. These findings raise concerns about the long-term impact on human health, especially in vulnerable populations.

== U.S. drinking water regulations ==
In June 2022 the U.S. Environmental Protection Agency (EPA) published drinking water health advisories, which are non-regulatory technical documents, for GenX and PFBS. The lifetime health advisories and health effects support documents assist federal, state, tribal, and local officials and managers of drinking water systems in protecting public health when these chemicals are present in drinking water. EPA also listed recommended steps that consumers may take to reduce possible exposure to GenX and other PFAS chemicals.

In April 2024 EPA published final drinking water standards for GenX and five other PFAS compounds, pursuant to the Safe Drinking Water Act. The standards, enforced by EPA and state agencies, require all public water systems in the U.S. to monitor for GenX and treat their water, if necessary to meet the 10 ppt standard. EPA also announced the availability of grant funds to assist small and disadvantaged communities in testing for and treating PFAS contamination in their water systems.

== See also ==
- Perfluorinated alkylated substances (PFAS)
- Timeline of events related to per- and polyfluoroalkyl substances (PFAS)
