= AGRU Kunststofftechnik =

Austria-based plastic engineering company

agru Kunststofftechnik Gesellschaft m.b.H.
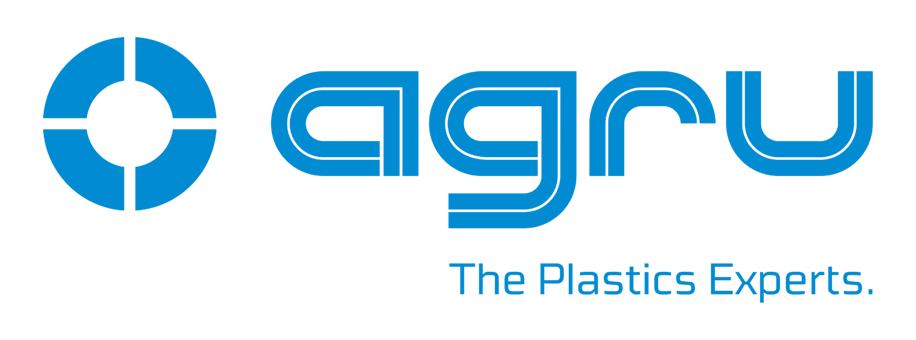
- Type: Gesellschaft mit beschränkter Haftung
- Industry: plastics
- Founded: 1948 in Bad Hall, Upper Austria, Austria
- Founder: Alois Gruber sen.
- Headquarters: Bad Hall, Austria
- Revenue: 375 mio. (2018)
- Owner: Mag. Alois Gruber
- Number of employees: 1020 (2018)
- Website: www.agru.at/en/

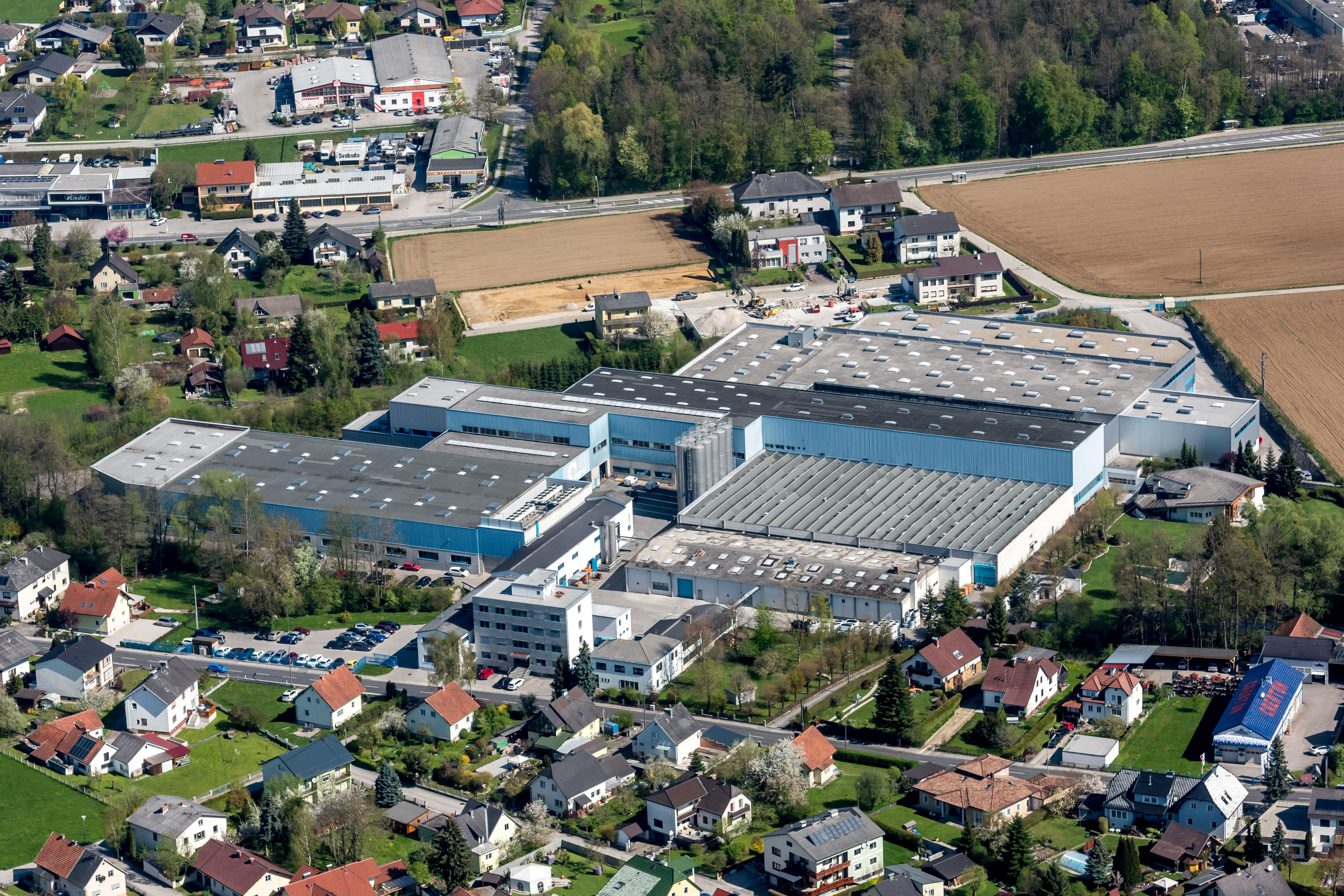
AGRU Plant 1 in Bad Hall

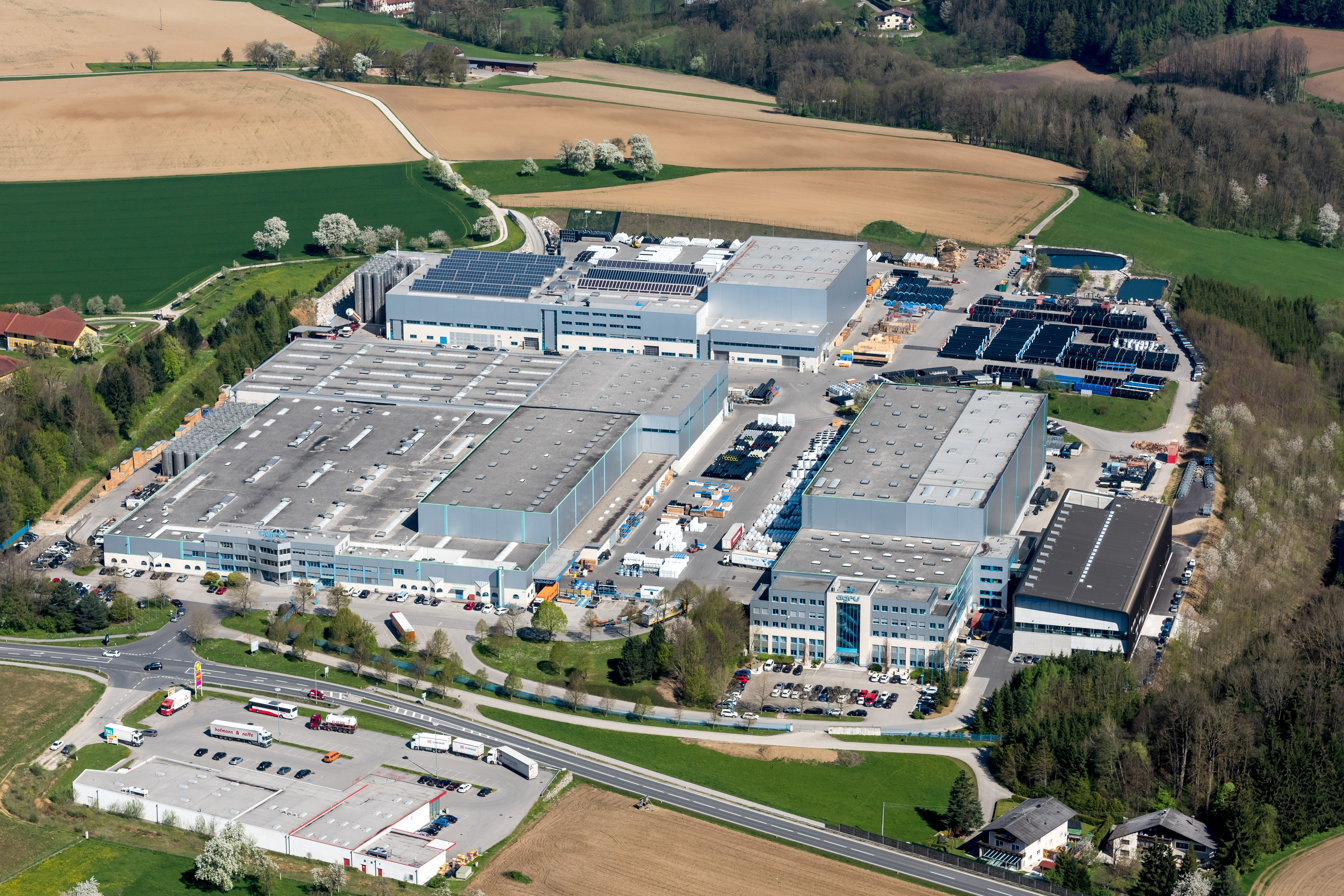
AGRU Plant 2–5 in Bad Hall

agru Kunststofftechnik Gesellschaft m.b.H. is a company with global operations in engineering plastics based in Bad Hall, Austria, and was founded in 1948 by Alois Gruber senior. AGRU manufactures and supplies pipeline systems, semi-finished products, concrete protection liners, and geomembranes made of engineered plastics. As one of the 130 largest industrial companies in Austria, and one of Upper Austrias' TOP 50 biggest Companies, AGRU employs 1020 staff and has global sales of EUR 375 million (2017). In addition to the five factories at the global headquarters in Bad Hall, the company operates production sites in the United States, Germany, Poland and China. The export share is over 90%. Sales partners in more than 150 countries distribute products from AGRU, for which approximately 100,000 tons of plastic are processed annually.

== Company history ==
=== Beginnings ===
In 1948, Alois Gruber senior founded a locksmith business in Bad Hall and an anodizing plant in Grünburg. In the 1950s, the locksmith business was dissolved to focus on anodizing, which was expanded by a powder coating and a wet paint shop. This knowledge is summarized today in AGRU Oberflächentechnik GmbH, in Grünburg, Upper Austria. AGRU Oberflächentechnik GmbH operates independently from agru Kunststofftechnik Gesellschaft m.b.H., but is under the same management.

=== Plastic technology ===
In 1961, Alois Gruber senior laid the foundations of AGRU's future in engineered plastics with the decision to begin production of plastic pipes. In the following years, production was expanded. First, with the introduction of polypropylene and polyethylene pipes, and later with the production of fittings, plates, bars, and welding rods made of different engineered plastics. Pipes with different diameters are the main part of production. The pipes can also be installed trenchless. For a project in Germany, AGRULINE large diameter pipes with OD 1400 mm were installed for the first time with the horizontal directional drilling method.

=== Injection moulding ===
By 1966, AGRU's first injection molding machines were in operation producing fittings for pipeline construction, making AGRU one of the first manufacturers in Europe to supply pipes and fittings from their own production facilities. The productivity gain during manufacturing was significant. Up to this point, fittings were segmented and required pipes to be welded together. In contrast, injection-moulded plastic fittings have no weld seams inside (seams serve as a braking mechanism for flowing media), creating superior flow characteristics in the complete pipeline system. Finally, by producing the pipes from one mould pressure resistance can be increased.

=== Internationalization ===
In 1988, AGRU established its first production location outside of Austria in Boston, Massachusetts. This marked the beginning of the international expansion of the family business. Then, in 1991, AGRU-FRANK GmbH was founded in Wölfersheim, Germany in cooperation with the German sales partner FRANK GmbH. In 1996, AGRU America moved its United States’ production site from Boston to Georgetown, South Carolina. .

=== Further development ===
In 1997, AGRU started the production of electro-socket fittings. This was done by taking the heating wire, and the electro socket, and pouring or plastering it into specially designed fittings.

=== Company expansion ===
In 1998, Alois Gruber, the son of the company founder, began managing the AGRU business. The headquarters location in Bad Hall was expanded for the first time since its founding. And after the turn of the millennium, AGRU set up plant III and IV at the headquarters. In addition, AGRU expanded its international production sites as joint ventures in Poland, China, and the United States. With these new production sites, AGRU could begin producing large-diameter pipes of up to 2,500 mm in 2012. In 2016, AGRU constructed plant V, an ISO class 5 clean-room production facility, setting a new industry standard for the production of pipe systems for ultrapure media applications. The new pipes are now distributed under the PURAD brand and are designed for high-tech applications where purity, leaching performance, and chemical resistance are prerequisites. Application areas include microelectronics, life science and the food industry as well as ultrapure water systems in different sectors.

== Product categories ==
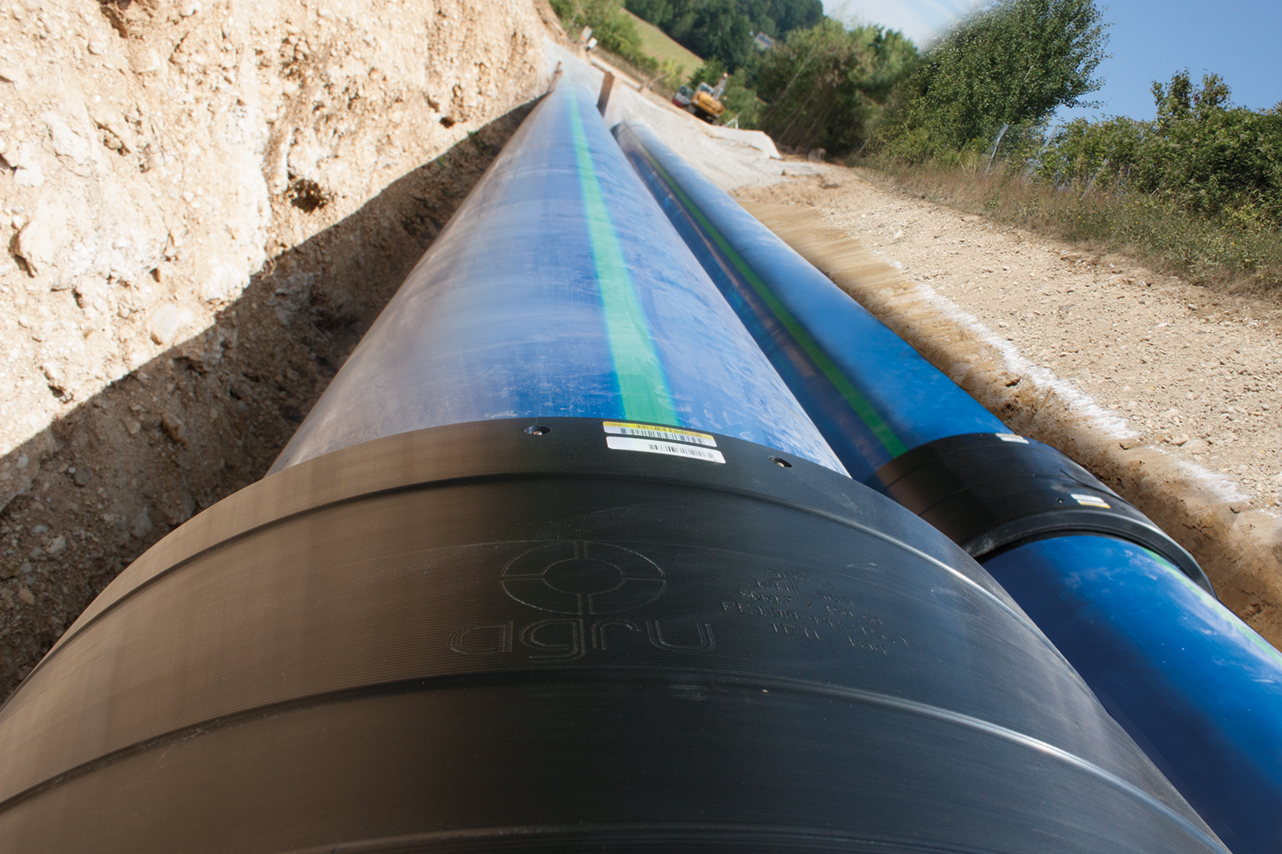
AGRULINE Sureline potable water pipe with coloured signal layer

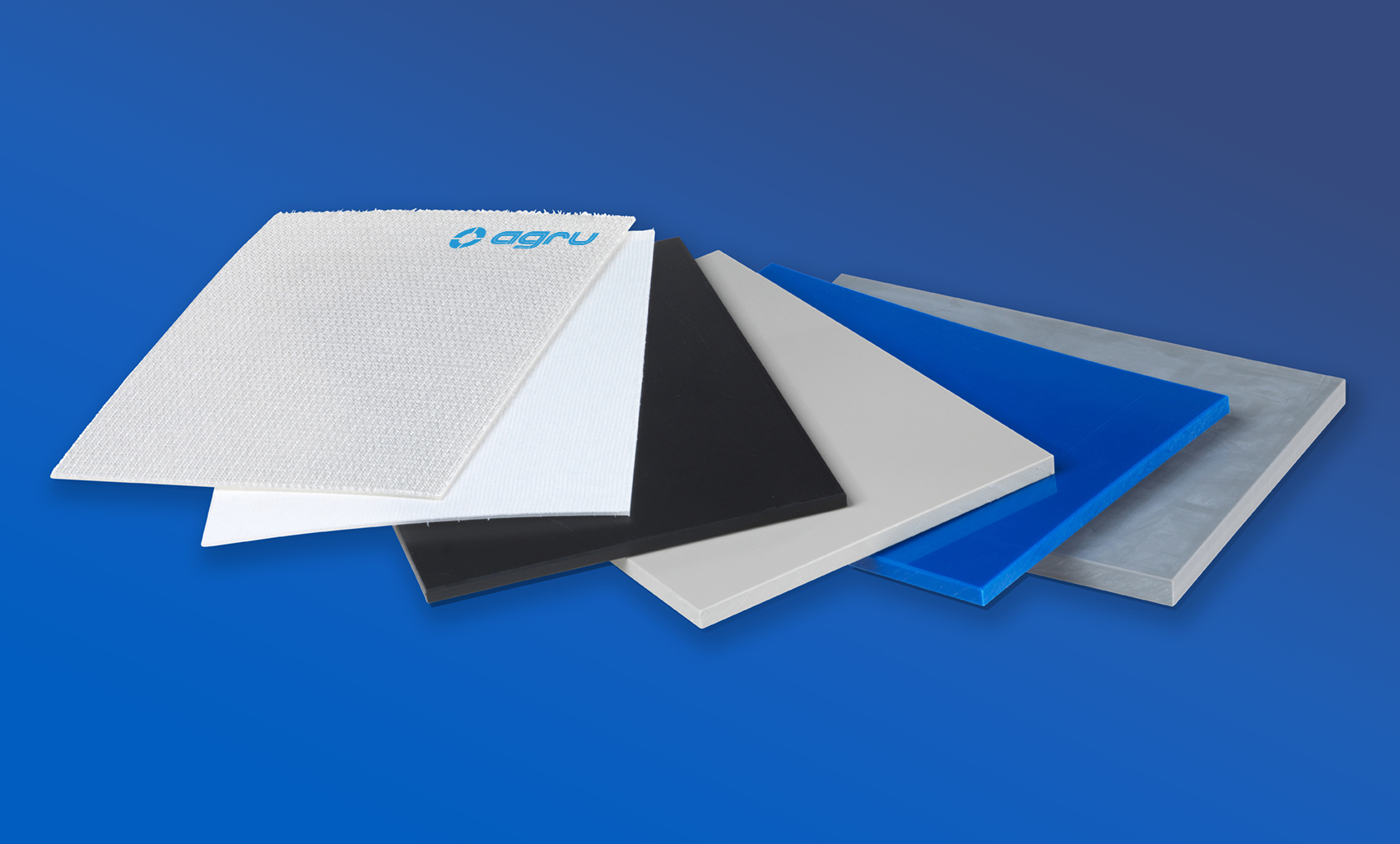
AGRU SEMI-FINISHED sheets

AGRU manufactures pipe systems for various applications, semi-finished products, concrete protection liners as well as geomembranes for landfill and tunnel construction from high-quality plastics. The company supplies industries such as the water and gas industry, the energy industry, the chemical and heavy industries, the semiconductor and pharmaceutical industries, containers and shipbuilding, mining, and civil engineering. The products are divided into the seven product groups AGRULINE, INDUSTRY, PURAD, CONCRETE PROTECTION, SEMI-FINISHED, AGRUSAN & AGRUAIR and LINING SYSTEMS.

Product category	Product	Description
AGRULINE	Piping systems	PE 100 Pipe systems for gas and water supply as well as sanitation and PE 100-RC Pipe systems for trenchless and sand bed-free laying in dimensions up to 2500 mm.
INDUSTRY	Piping systems	Pipes and double containment pipes made of Polypropylene (PP), PEHD-el, PPs, PPs-el, Polyvinylidene fluoride (PVDF) and ECTFE (Ethylene ChloroTriFluoroEthylene) for industrial applications such as transport of aggressive media and contaminated wastewater.
PURAD	Piping systems	Pipe systems in PVDF-UHP, PP-Pure, Polypure and ECTFE for transport of high-purity media in the semiconductor, pharmaceutical and food industries.
CONCRETE PROTECTION	Concrete protection liners	Concrete protection liners and profiles made of Polyethylene (PE), Polypropylene (PP), PVDF and ECTFE to protect concrete structures against chemical corrosion.
SEMI-FINISHED	Semi finished product	Bars, welding rods and sheets made of thermoplastics such as PP, Polyethylene (PE), PPs, PPs, PEHD, PEHD-el, PVDF, ECTFE, Fluorinated ethylene propylene (FEP) and Perfluoroalkoxy alkane (PFA) ensure the safe operation of equipment and tanks.
AGRUSAN & AGRUAIR	Piping System	Pipe systems made of PE 100 blue for various compressed air applications. AGRUSAN Piping system made of PP-R red for sanitary installations with cold and hot water.
LINING SYSTEMS	Geomembranes	PE-LD, PE-LLD and FPP protection liners and geomembranes, as well as PE and PP drainage systems for landfills, tunnels and ponds.

== Production sites ==
The family business agru Kunststofftechnik Gesellschaft m.b.H. has eight production sites in five countries. In some cases these are managed as joint ventures.

- Austria
  - agru Kunststofftechnik Gesellschaft m.b.H., Bad Hall
  - agru Oberflächentechnik Gesellschaft m.b.H., Waldneukirchen
- Germany
  - AGRU-Frank GmbH, Wölfersheim
- United States
  - AGRU America Inc., Georgetown/South Carolina
  - AGRU America Inc., Fernley/Nevada
  - AGRU America Inc., Andrews/South Carolina
- Poland
  - TWS Thermoplastic Winding Systems, Lozienica
- China
  - Taicang AGRU Plastics Co., Taicang
