= PMVE =

PMVE may refer to:

- Poly(methyl vinyl ether), a polymer of methyl vinyl ether
- Perfluoro(methyl vinyl ether), a monomer used to make some fluoroelastomers
- Politically Motivated Violent Extremism, encourages the use of violence to establish new political systems, or new structures and norms within existing systems
