= Fluoroether E-1 =

Names
- Other names heptafluoropropyl 1,2,2,2-tetrafluoroethyl ether, secondary hydrogen endcap

Identifiers
| CAS Number | 3330-15-2 |
| 3D model (JSmol) | Interactive image |
| ChemSpider | 85066 |
| ECHA InfoCard | 100.196.998 |
| EC Number | 236-236-8 |
| PubChem CID | 94258 |
| CompTox Dashboard (EPA) | DTXSID8052017 |
- InChI: InChI=1S/C5HF11O/c6-1(2(7,8)9)17-5(15,16)3(10,11)4(12,13)14/h1H
- SMILES: C(C(F)(F)F)(OC(C(C(F)(F)F)(F)F)(F)F)F

Properties
| Chemical formula | C_{5}HF_{11}O |
| Molar mass | 286.044 g·mol^{−1} |
| Appearance | Colourless liquid |
| Density | 1.538/cm^{3} (at 20 °C) |
| Boiling point | 40–42 °C (104–108 °F; 313–315 K) |

Hazards
- GHS labelling
| Pictograms | (GHS07: Exclamation mark) |
| Signal word | Warning |
| Hazard statements | H302, H314, H335 |
| Precautionary statements | P261, P264, P264+P265, P271, P280, P302+P352, P304+P340, P305+P351+P338, P319, P321, P332+P317, P337+P317, P362+P364, P403+P233, P405, P501 |
| NFPA 704 (fire diamond) | 3 2 0 |
- Safety data sheet (SDS)
- Except where otherwise noted, data are given for materials in their standard state (at 25 °C [77 °F], 100 kPa). Infobox references

Fluoroether E-1 (known chemically as heptafluoropropyl 1,2,2,2-tetrafluoroethyl ether, is a chemical compound that is among the class of per- and polyfluoroalkyl substances (PFAS). This synthetic fluorochemical is used in the GenX process, and may arise from the degradation of GenX chemicals including FRD-903.

== Production ==
The main production of Fluoroether E-1 is within the GenX process where FRD-903 (2,3,3,3-tetrafluoro-2-(heptafluoropropoxy)propanoic acid) is used to generate (FRD-902) ammonium 2,3,3,3-tetrafluoro-2-(heptafluoropropoxy)propanoate, and Fluoroether E-1 (heptafluoropropyl 1,2,2,2-tetrafluoroethyl ether).

== Properties ==
Fluoroether E-1 is a colorless liquid that is practically insoluble in water. It is volatile and has a low boiling point.
