= Perfluoroalkyl ether sulfonic acid =

Structural formula of F-53, the potassium salt of a PFESA

Perfluoroalkyl ether sulfonic acids (abbreviated as PFESAs) refers to compounds with the formula CF_{3}(CF_{2})_{m}O(CF_{2})_{n}SO_{3}H. Several are known. These compounds are members of the PFAS class of fluorocarbon-based surfactants. They were invented partly in response to the controversy over the persistence of PFAS. Some PFESAs can be prepared from hexafluoropropylene oxide.

Studies of PFESAs in lab mice have demonstrated comparatively higher hepatotoxicity than PFOS. Industrially, PFESAs are used in chromium plating and as a replacement for other PFAS in fluoropolymer manufacturing.
