= FRD-903 =

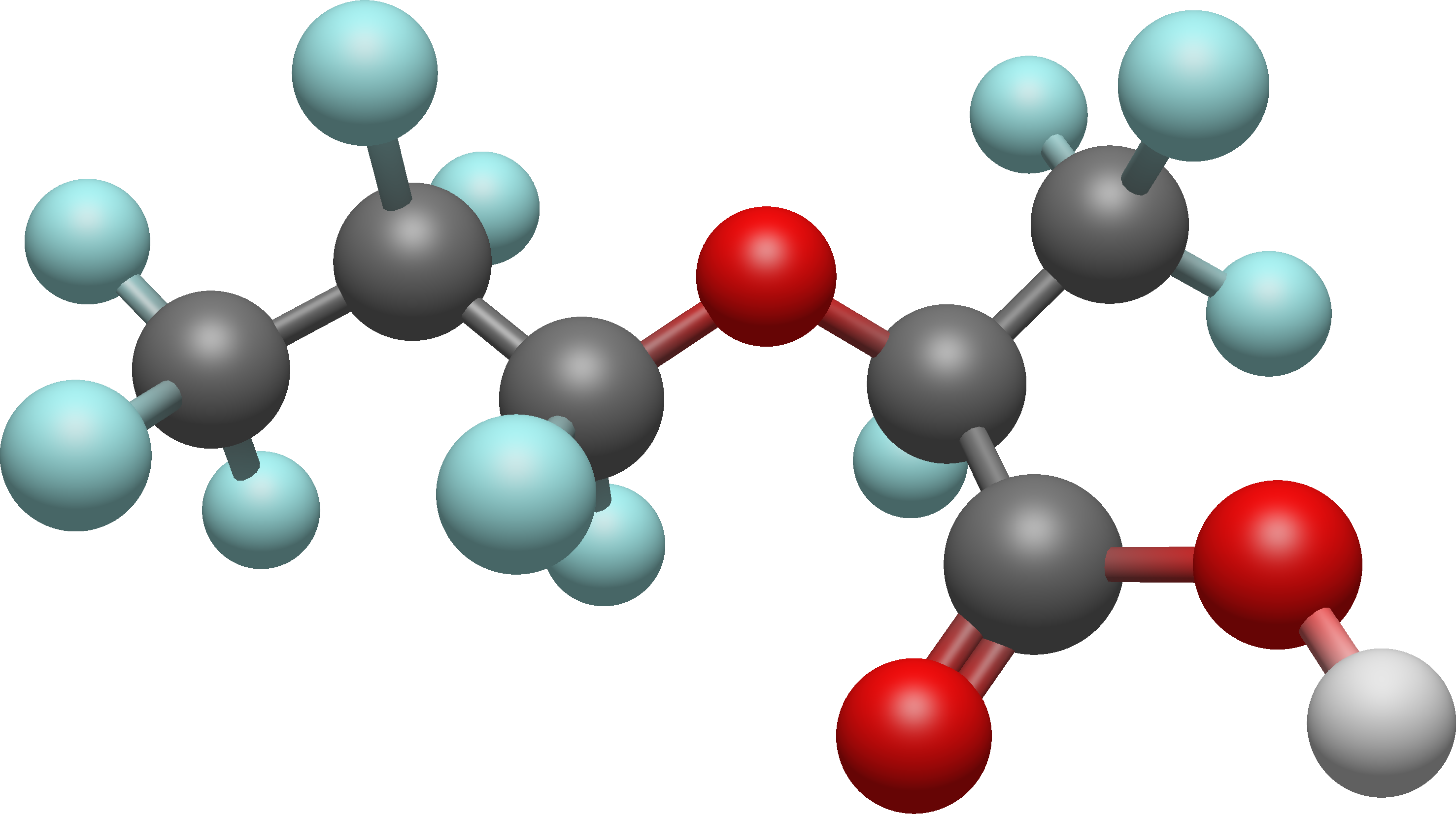

Names
- Preferred IUPAC name 2,3,3,3-Tetrafluoro-2-(heptafluoropropoxy)propanoic acid
- Other names Perfluoro-2-propoxypropanoic acid, hexafluoropropylene oxide dimer acid (HFPO-DA), C3 dimer acid

Identifiers
CAS Number	13252-13-6
3D model (JSmol)	Interactive image
ChEBI	CHEBI:143205
ChEMBL	ChEMBL2008338
ChemSpider	102538
ECHA InfoCard	100.032.928
EC Number	236-236-8
PubChem CID	114481
UNII	R8C5T5N5HN
CompTox Dashboard (EPA)	DTXSID70880215
- InChI: Key: CSEBNABAWMZWIF-UHFFFAOYSA-N; InChI=1S/C6HF11O3/c7-2(1(18)19,4(10,11)12)20-6(16,17)3(8,9)5(13,14)15/h(H,18,19)
- SMILES: C(=O)(C(C(F)(F)F)(OC(C(C(F)(F)F)(F)F)(F)F)F)O

Properties
Chemical formula	C_{6}HF_{11}O_{3}
Molar mass	330.053 g·mol^{−1}
Appearance	Liquid <60 °C
Density	1.748 g/cm^{3} (at 20 °C)
Solubility in water	Soluble, 739 g/L
Acidity (pK_{a})	3.82

Hazards
- GHS labelling
Pictograms	(GHS07: Exclamation mark) (GHS05: Corrosive)
Signal word	Danger
Hazard statements	H302, H314, H335
Precautionary statements	P260, P264, P264+P265, P270, P271, P280, P301+P317, P301+P330+P331, P302+P361+P354, P304+P340, P305+P354+P338, P316, P317, P319, P321, P330, P363, P403+P233, P405, P501
NFPA 704 (fire diamond)	3 2 0
Flash point	60 °C (140 °F; 333 K)
- Safety data sheet (SDS)
- Except where otherwise noted, data are given for materials in their standard state (at 25 °C [77 °F], 100 kPa). Infobox references

FRD-903 (also known as hexafluoropropylene oxide dimer acid, HFPO-DA, and 2,3,3,3-tetrafluoro-2-(heptafluoropropoxy)propanoic acid) is a chemical compound that is among the class of per- and polyfluoroalkyl substances (PFASs). More specifically, this synthetic petrochemical is also described as a perfluoroalkyl ether carboxylic acid (PFECA) and a Fluorointermediate. It is not biodegradable and is not hydrolyzed by water.

== Production ==
The production process involves 2 molecules of hexafluoropropylene oxide (HFPO) to produce hexafluoropropylene oxide dimer acid fluoride (FRD-903). The ammonium salt of FRD-903 is FRD-902 (ammonium (2,3,3,3-tetrafluoro-2-(heptafluoropropoxy)propanoate)), which is the specific chemical which Chemours has trademarked as part of GenX process. FRD-903 is used as an aid within the manufacturing process for fluoropolymers by reducing the surface tension in the process, allowing polymer particles to increase in size. The process is completed with chemical treatment or heating to remove the FRD-903 from the final polymer product. It can then be recovered for re-use within the process.

== Drinking water ==
In 2020, Michigan adopted drinking water standards for five previously unregulated PFAS compounds including HFPO-DA which has a maximum contaminant level (MCL) of 370 parts per trillion (ppt).

In March 2023, the EPA announced drinking water standards for several PFAS chemicals, which included FRD-903.
