= Bad Hall =

- Municipality
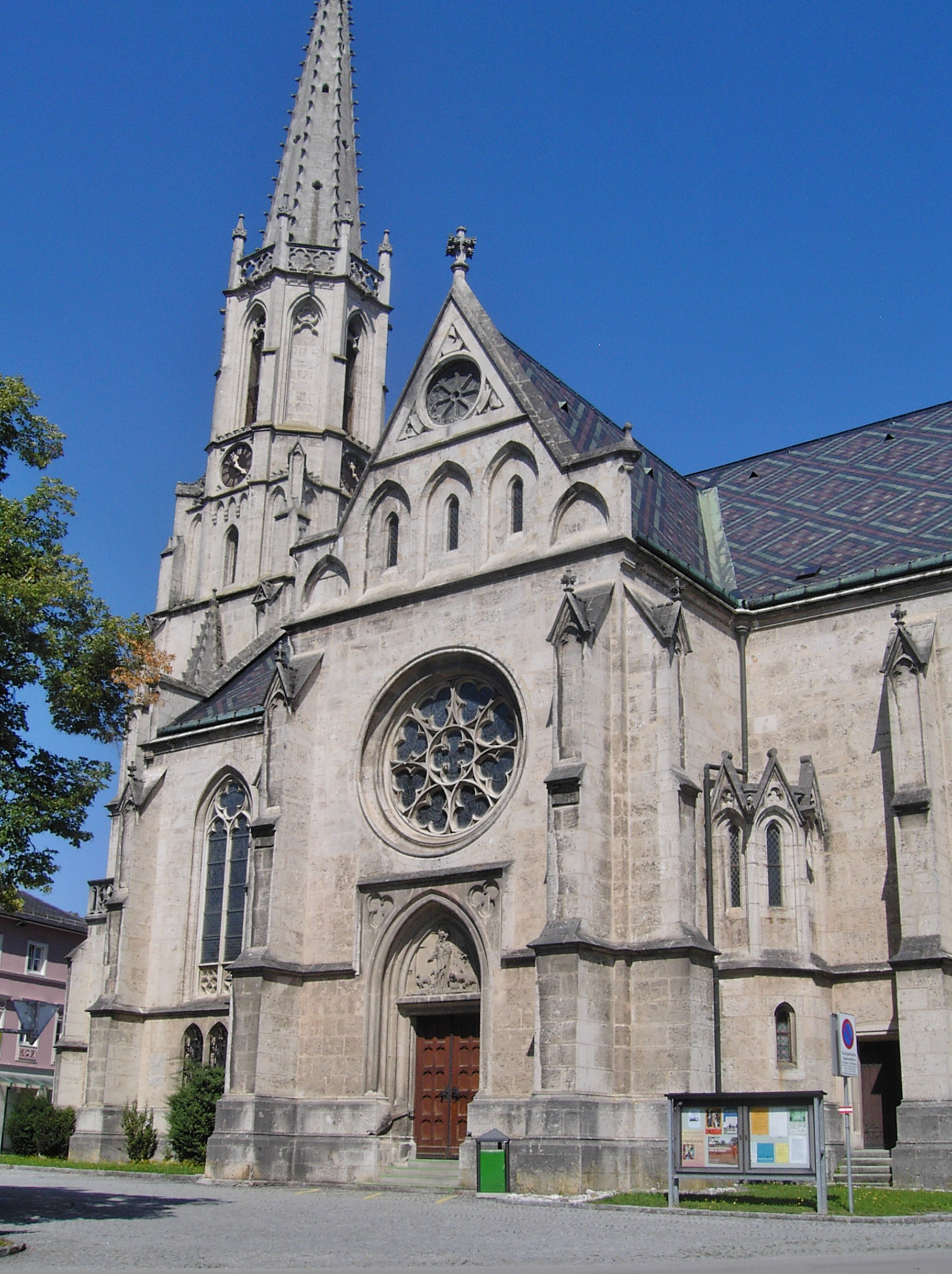

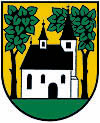
- Coat of arms

- Location within Austria
- Coordinates: 48°02′00″N 14°12′00″E
- Country: Austria
- State: Upper Austria
- District: Steyr-Land

Government
  - Mayor: Bernhard Ruf (ÖVP)

Area
  - Total: 13.36 km^{2} (5.16 sq mi)
- Elevation: 380 m (1,250 ft)

Population (2018-01-01)
  - Total: 5,296
  - Density: 396.4/km^{2} (1,027/sq mi)
- Time zone: UTC+1 (CET)
  - Summer (DST): UTC+2 (CEST)
- Postal code: 4540
- Area code: 07258
- Vehicle registration: SE
- Website: www.bad-hall.ooe.gv.at

Bad Hall is a market town in the Steyr-Land district of the Austrian state of Upper Austria. Its name, Bad Hall, means "salt bath," a reference to its long history of baths and spas. It is renowned for its saline springs, strongly impregnated with iodine and bromine. Although the springs have been known since the 8th century, Hall has been noted for them only since 1855, when the springs became the property of the government.

Due to the saline springs tourism is well developed in Bad Hall. There are also some industrial companies (e.g. AGRU Kunststofftechnik) as well as oil exploration around Bad Hall (e.g. RAG AG).

== Geography ==
The town is situated in the Traunviertel region, about 30 km south of the Upper Austrian capital Linz.

== History ==
Bad Hall was first mentioned in the year 777, which makes it one of the first recorded towns in Upper Austria.

In 1287 Hall received the rights of a market community.

In 1861 the rural parts of Hall split up. The parts that have been cut off became the municipality Pfarrkirchen bei Bad Hall.

=== Spa resort ===
In 1873 the physician Hermann Schuber had a pamphlet printed, exhalating the virtues of the Bad Hall spas. He was appointed spa doctor and became a senior consultant to the Imperial and Royal Hospital for Military Pupils. The Bad Hall spa was first mentioned in preserved historic records from the late 14th century. However, the medical benefits of the Bad Hall spas were documented in academic literature published around 1820.

In the 19th century people began to use the springs for commercial purposes.

In order to avoid confusion in 1877 the name was changed to Bad Hall.

At the end of the 19th century Bad Hall experienced a golden age like many spa towns at that time. Famous people like Gustav Mahler, Adalbert Stifter, Franz Grillparzer or Franz Joseph I of Austria were visiting the town at that time.

During World War II Bad Hall was a place of refuge for hospitals from Vienna and Linz, because of increasing bomb attacks on big Austrian cities.

Bad Hall has received the status of a town.

== Culture ==
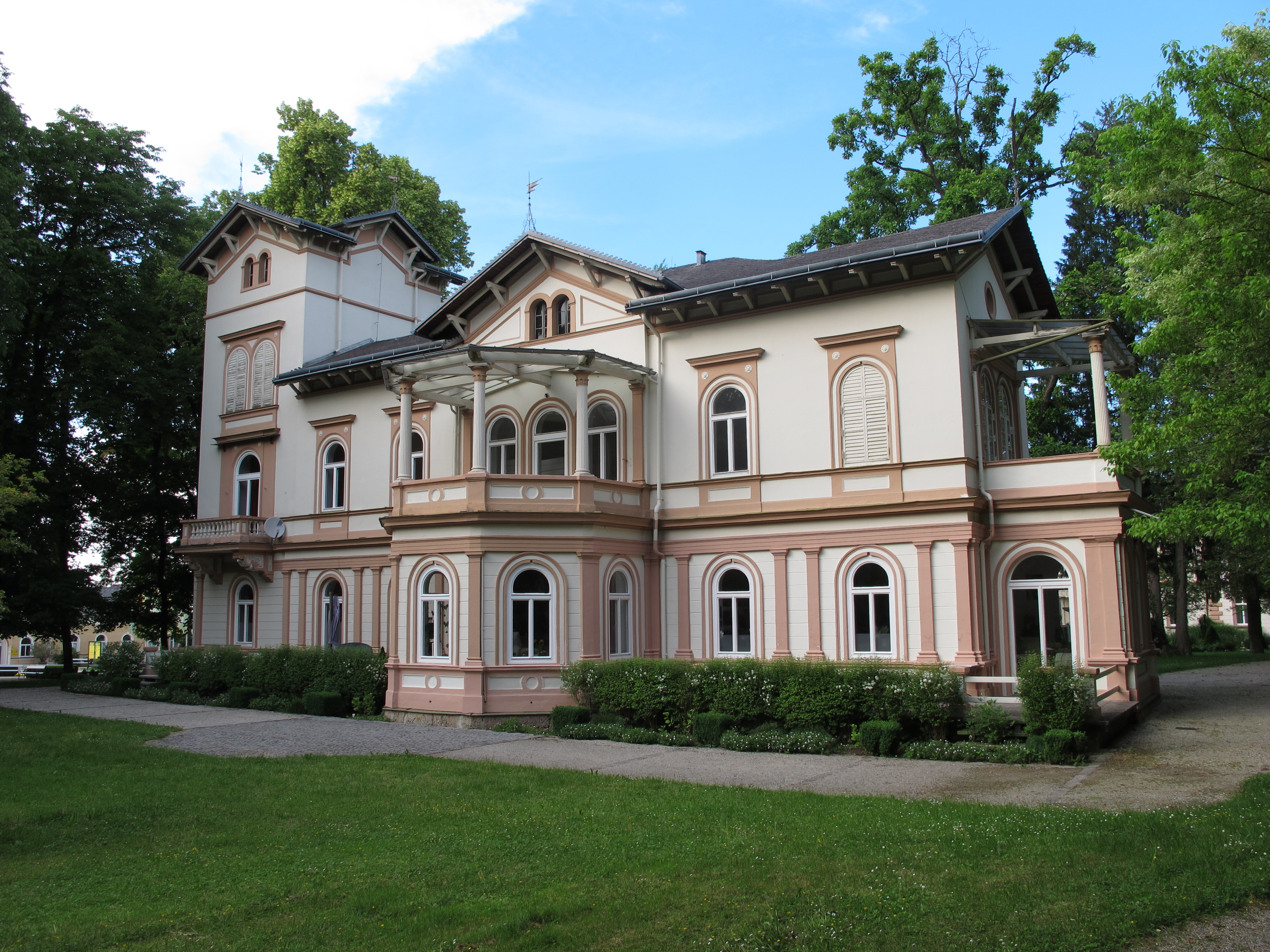
Villa Rabl

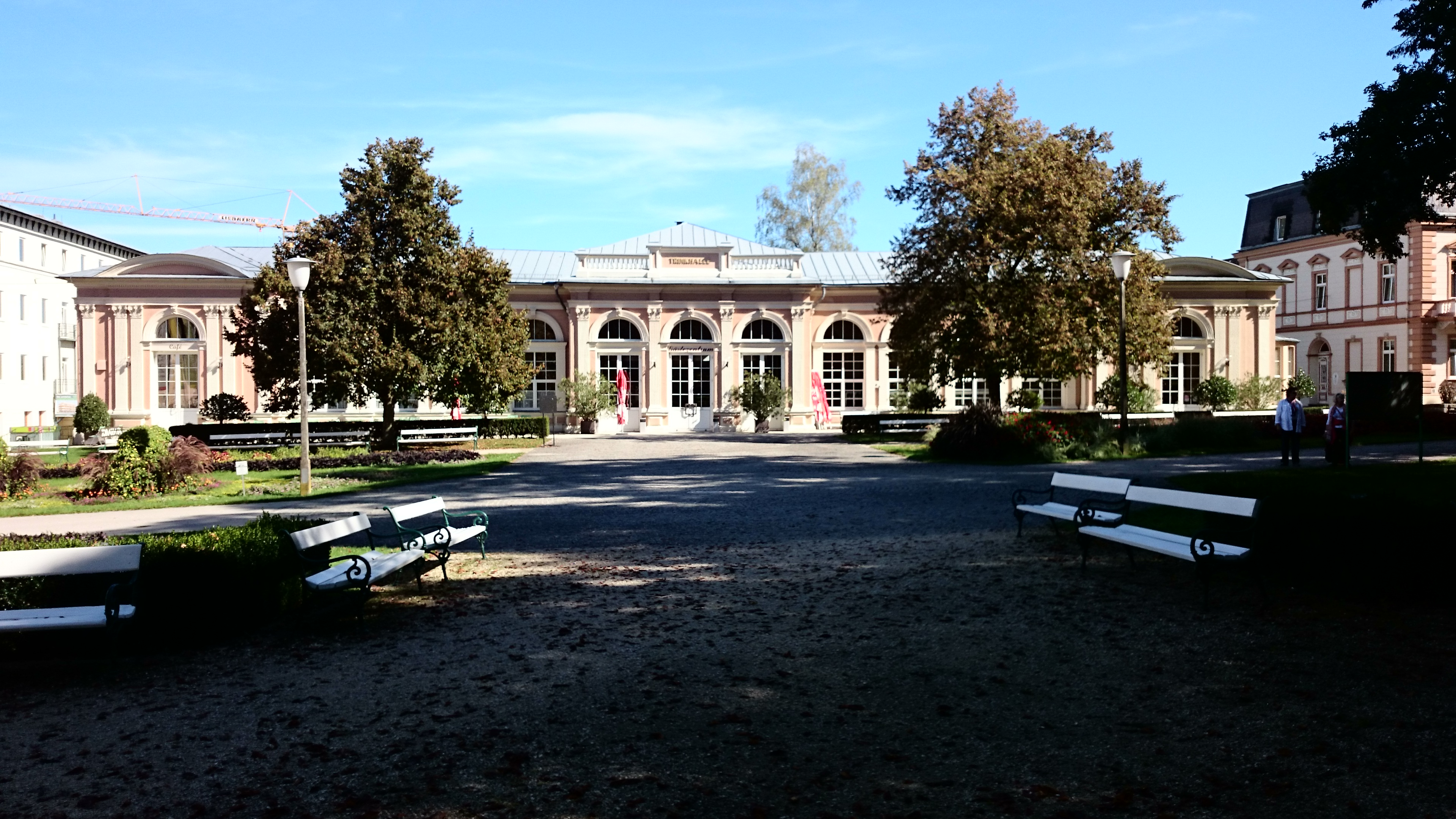
Gästezentrum (Trinkhalle)

=== Theaters ===
- Stadttheater Bad Hall

=== Museums ===
- Forum Hall (Heimatmuseum, Haustürensammlung, Handwerkermuseum)

=== Architecture ===
- Landesvilla
- Kurpark
- Kurhaus
- Gästezentrum (Trinkhalle)
- Villa Rabl
- Marienhof

== Population ==
Historical population
Year	Pop.	±%
1869	1,486	—
1880	1,551	+4.4%
1890	1,502	−3.2%
1900	1,658	+10.4%
1910	1,870	+12.8%
1923	1,961	+4.9%
1934	2,075	+5.8%
1939	2,297	+10.7%
1951	3,343	+45.5%
1961	3,697	+10.6%
1971	4,051	+9.6%
1981	4,053	+0.0%
1991	4,250	+4.9%
2001	4,752	+11.8%
2011	4,804	+1.1%
