= Perfluoroalkoxy alkane =

Family of polymers

PFA
Line diagram of the perfluoroalkoxy monomer
Density	2150 kg/m^{3}
Flexural modulus(E)	586 MPa
Tensile strength(_{t})	24 MPa
Elongation at break	300%
Folding endurance	No break
Notch test	
Melting point	315 °C
Maximum operating temperature	260 °C
Water absorption (ASTM)	<0.03 % after 24 hours
Dielectric constant (Dk) at 1MHz	2.1
Dissipation factor at 1MHz	0.0001
Arc resistance	< 180 seconds
Resistivity at 50% R. H.	> 10^{16} Ω m

Perfluoroalkoxy alkanes (PFA) are fluoropolymers. They are copolymers of tetrafluoroethylene (C_{2}F_{4}) and perfluoroethers (C_{2}F_{3}OR^{f}, where R^{f} is a perfluorinated group such as trifluoromethyl (CF_{3})). The properties of these polymers are similar to those of polytetrafluoroethylene (PTFE). Compared to PTFE, PFA has better anti-stick properties and higher chemical resistance, at the expense of lesser scratch resistance.

== Properties ==
Unlike with PTFE, the alkoxy substituents allow the polymer to be melt-processed. On a molecular level, PFA polymers have a smaller chain length and higher chain entanglement than other fluoropolymers. They also contain an oxygen atom at the branches. This results in materials that are more translucent and have improved flow and creep resistance, with thermal stability close to or exceeding PTFE. Thus, PFA is preferred when extended service is required in hostile environments involving chemical, thermal, and mechanical stress. PFA offers high melt strength, stability at high processing temperatures, excellent crack and stress resistance and a low coefficient of friction. Similarly enhanced processing properties are found in fluorinated ethylene propylene (FEP), the copolymer of tetrafluoroethylene and hexafluoropropylene. However FEP is ten times less capable of withstanding repeated bending without fracture than PFA.

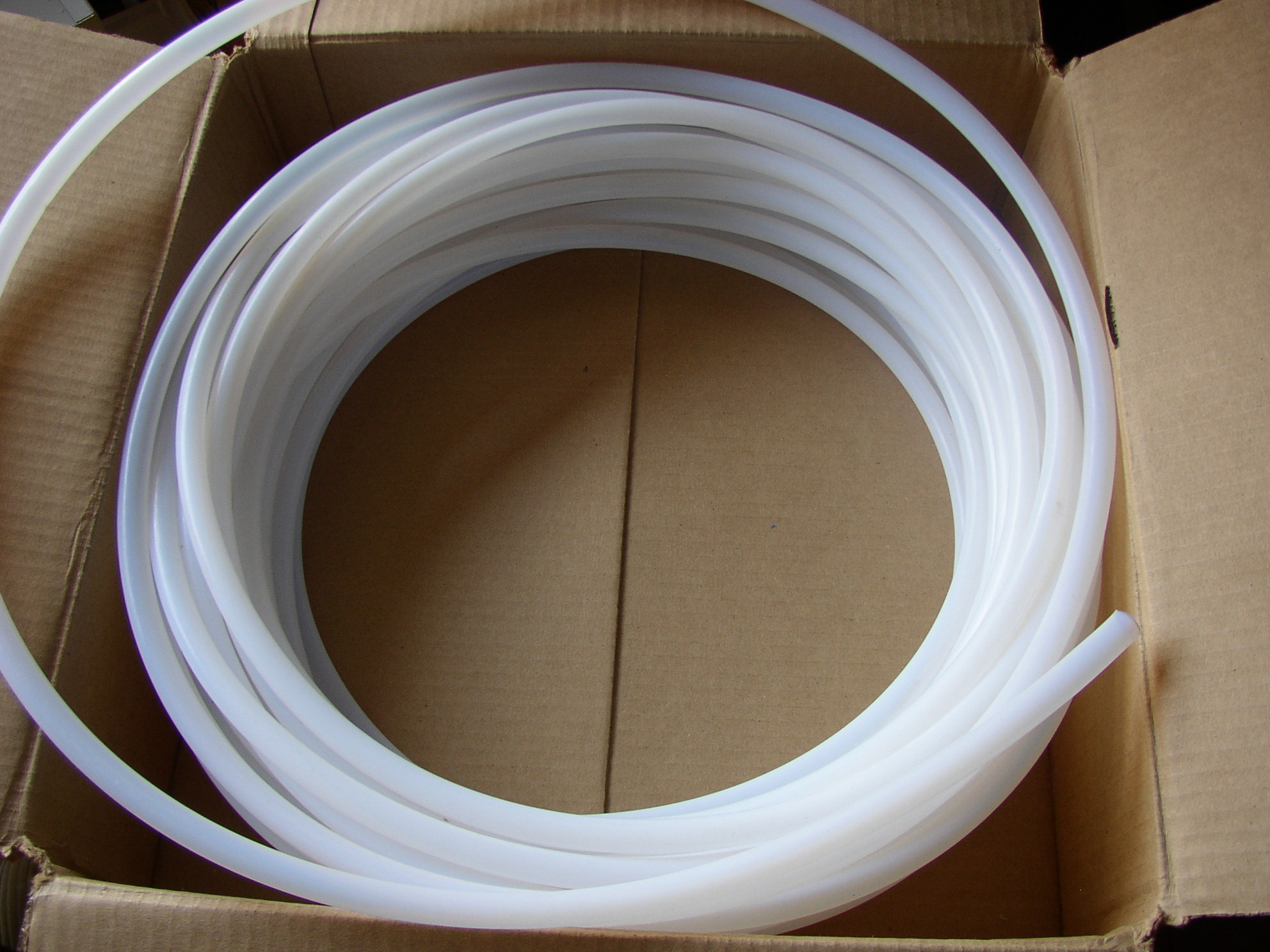
Perfluoroalkoxy alkane is used to fabricate tubes to handle aggressive chemicals.

== Applications ==
PFA is commonly used as a material for piping and as fittings for aggressive chemicals, as well as the corrosion-resistant lining of vessels in the chemical-processing industry. Typical applications include the construction of gas scrubbers, reactors, containment vessels and piping. In coal-fired power plants, it is used for lining heat exchangers. By channeling crude gas through a PFA-lined apparatus, the gas stream can be cooled below its condensation temperature without damaging the heat exchanger. Its use contributes to increasing the efficiency of the whole plant.

PFA is also used to make sampling equipment in analytical chemistry and for geochemical or environmental in situ studies in the field, when it is particularly important to avoid chemical contamination from metallic ions at trace levels. It is also used as jacket insulation in high-temperature electrical wiring applications.

== Production ==
PFA is produced as a copolymer of tetrafluoroethylene and a perfluoroether, usually perfluoro(methyl vinyl ether). Preparation of the perfluoroether precursors is more complex than partially fluorinated vinyl ethers, which can be made from the reaction of tetrafluoroethylene with alkoxides:

RO^{−} + F_{2}C=CF_{2} → F_{2}C=CFOR + F^{−}

However, the instability of α-fluoroalcohols makes preparation of most perfluoroalkoxides impractical. Instead, production of vinyl perfluoroethers can be achieved by pyrolysis of a perfluoro(2-alkoxy carboxylate) salt.

This reaction, called dehalocarbonylation, proceeds by the elimination of CO_{2} from the carboxylate, forming a carbanion intermediate that then undergoes elimination of fluoride to form the alkene. The vinyl ether can also be prepared directly from an acyl fluoride by using sodium carbonate:

ROCF(CF_{3})COF + Na_{2}CO_{3} → ROCF=CF_{2} + 2 CO_{2} + 2 NaF

Common trademarks include Teflon-PFA, Hostaflon-PFA and Chemfluor. Chemours claims to be the only U.S. producer of PFA at its Fayetteville Works plant in northern Bladen County.

== Environmental and health risks ==
The monomers of such perfluoroalkoxy alkane polymers, in common with other per- and polyfluoroalkyl substances, are widespread in the environment due to human production and release of the chemicals; so durable that they are referred to as "forever chemicals"; and have detrimental health concerns not yet fully understood.

In 2023, the United States EPA proposed "the first (US national) standard to limit (PFAs) in drinking water;" albeit only six of >12,000 such chemicals were addressed.

== See also ==
- Fluoropolymer
- Perfluoroether
