= Perfluorocycloalkene =

Class of chemical compounds

A perfluorocycloalkene (PFCA) fluorocarbon structure with a cycloalkene core. PFCAs have shown reactivity with a wide variety of nucleophiles including phenoxides, alkoxides, organometallic, amines, thiols, and azoles. They or their derivatives are reported to be useful as lubricants, etching agents, components of fuel cells, low-dielectric materials, and superhydrophobic and oleophobic coatings.

Examples of perfluorocycloalkenes

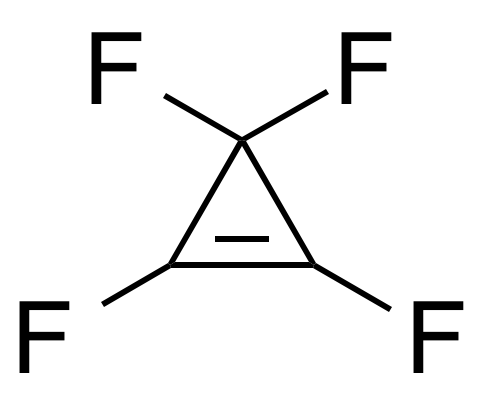
Tetrafluorocyclopropene

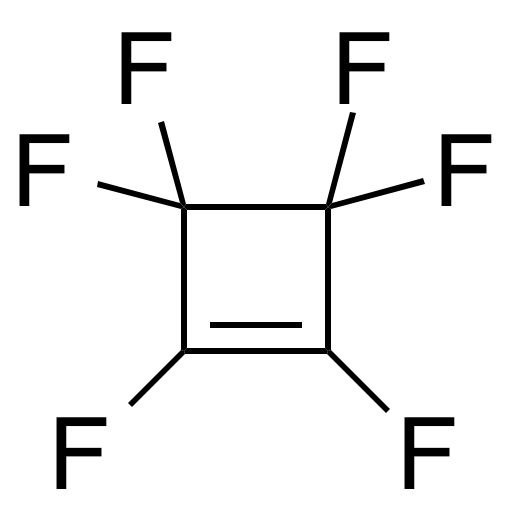
Hexafluorocyclobutene

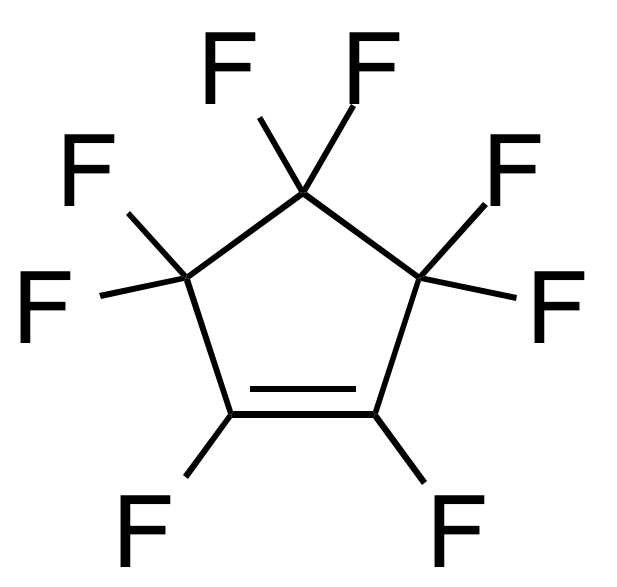
Octafluorocyclopentene

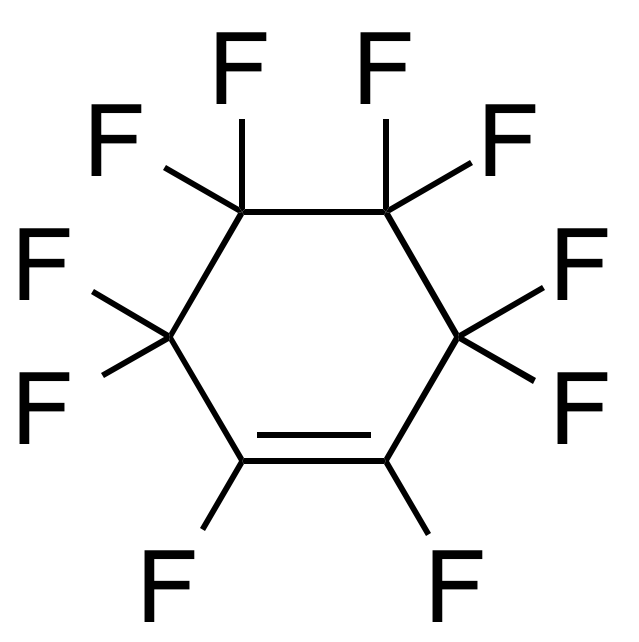
Decafluorocyclohexene

== Reactivity ==
Derivatization of these PFCA rings via displacement of fluorine atoms with nucleophiles occurs through an addition-elimination reaction in the presence of a base. Attack of the nucleophile on the PFCA ring generates a carbanion which can eliminate a fluoride ion, resulting in vinyl substituted and allyl substituted products (Scheme 1). The ratio of vinylic to allylic products depends on the ring size, reaction conditions, and nucleophile.

Scheme 1: Derivatization of the PFCA ring

Under favorable conditions, a good nucleophile can replace all the fluorine atoms on PFCA ring (Scheme 2).

Scheme 2: Multi-substitution of imidazole or 1,2,4-triazole onto PFCA ring

PFCAs have a huge potential to be used as a monomer to produce a variety of polymers. The polycondensation of bisphenols with PFCAs can be done. A unique class of aromatic ether polymers containing perfluorocyclopentenyl (PFCP) enchainment was prepared from the simple step-growth polycondensation of commercial available bisphenols and octafluorocyclopentene (OFCP) in the presence of triethylamine (Scheme 3 and 4).

Scheme 3. Perfluorocyclopentenyl (PFCP) aryl ether polymer synthesis

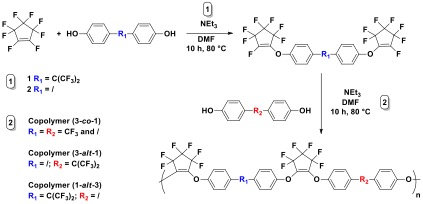
Scheme 4. Bis(heptafluorocyclopentenyl) aryl ether monomers synthesis and polymerization

Fluoropolymers, namely, perfluorocyclohexenyl (PFCH) aryl ether polymers, may be formed via step-growth polycondensation of commercial bisphenols and decafluorocycloalkene (DFCH) in the presence of triethylamine (Scheme 5).

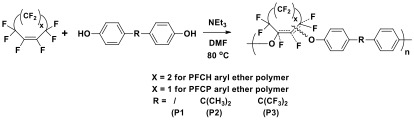
Scheme 5. Perfluorocycloalkenyl (PFCA) aryl ether polymer synthesis
