= Ferrofluidic seal =

Mechanical seal which uses magnetic liquid

Ferrofluidic seals, or magnetic liquid rotary seals, are used in rotating equipment to enable rotary motion while maintaining a hermetic seal using a physical barrier in the form of a ferrofluid. The ferrofluid is suspended in place by the use of a permanent magnet. Since their development in the 1970s, the seals have seen use in specialized applications such as computer disc drives, vacuum, and nuclear systems.

== Origins ==
Ferrofluidic seals rely on the general principle of ferrofluids - fluids that display magnetic attraction. Following research on ferrofluids during the 1960s, the ferrofluidic seal was first patented in 1971 by R.E. Rosensweig (USP 3,620,584), who subsequently founded Ferrofluidics Corporation with R. Moskowitz.

== Benefits and limitations ==
Magnetic liquid rotary seals operate with little maintenance and minimal leakage in a range of applications. Ferrofluid-based seals used in industrial and scientific applications are most often packaged in mechanical seal assemblies called rotary feed-throughs, which also contain a central shaft, ball bearings, and outer housing. The ball bearings provide two functions: maintaining the shaft's centering within the seal gap and supporting external loads. The bearings are the only mechanical wear items, as the dynamic seal is formed with a series of rings of ultra-low vapor pressure, oil-based liquid, held magnetically between the rotor and stator. As the ferrofluid retains its liquid properties even when magnetized, drag torque is very low. With the use of permanent magnets, the operating life and equipment maintenance cycles are generally very long. Ferrofluid-sealed feed-throughs reach their greatest performance levels by optimizing features such as ferrofluid Viscosity and magnetic strength, magnet and steel materials, bearing arrangements, and using water cooling for applications with extremely high speeds or temperatures. Ferrofluid-sealed feedthroughs can operate in environments including ultra-high vacuum (below 10^{−8} mbar), temperatures over 1,000 °C, tens of thousands of RPM, and multiple-atmosphere pressures.

Magnetic liquid seals can be engineered for a range of applications and exposure, but are generally limited to sealing gases and vapors, not direct pressurized liquid. This is due to premature failure of the ferrofluid seal when it seals a liquid. In 2020, research was underway to try and solve this problem.

Each particular combination of construction materials and design features has practical limits concerning temperature, differential pressure, speed, applied loads, and operating environment, and as such devices must be designed to meet the criteria for their applications. Necessary features may include multiple ferrofluid stages, water cooling, customized materials, permanent magnets, and exotic bearings. Ferrofluid-based seals have extremely low leak rates however they cannot reach the levels of welded connections or other all-metal, static (non-rotating) seals.
