= Krytox =

Group of industrial lubricants

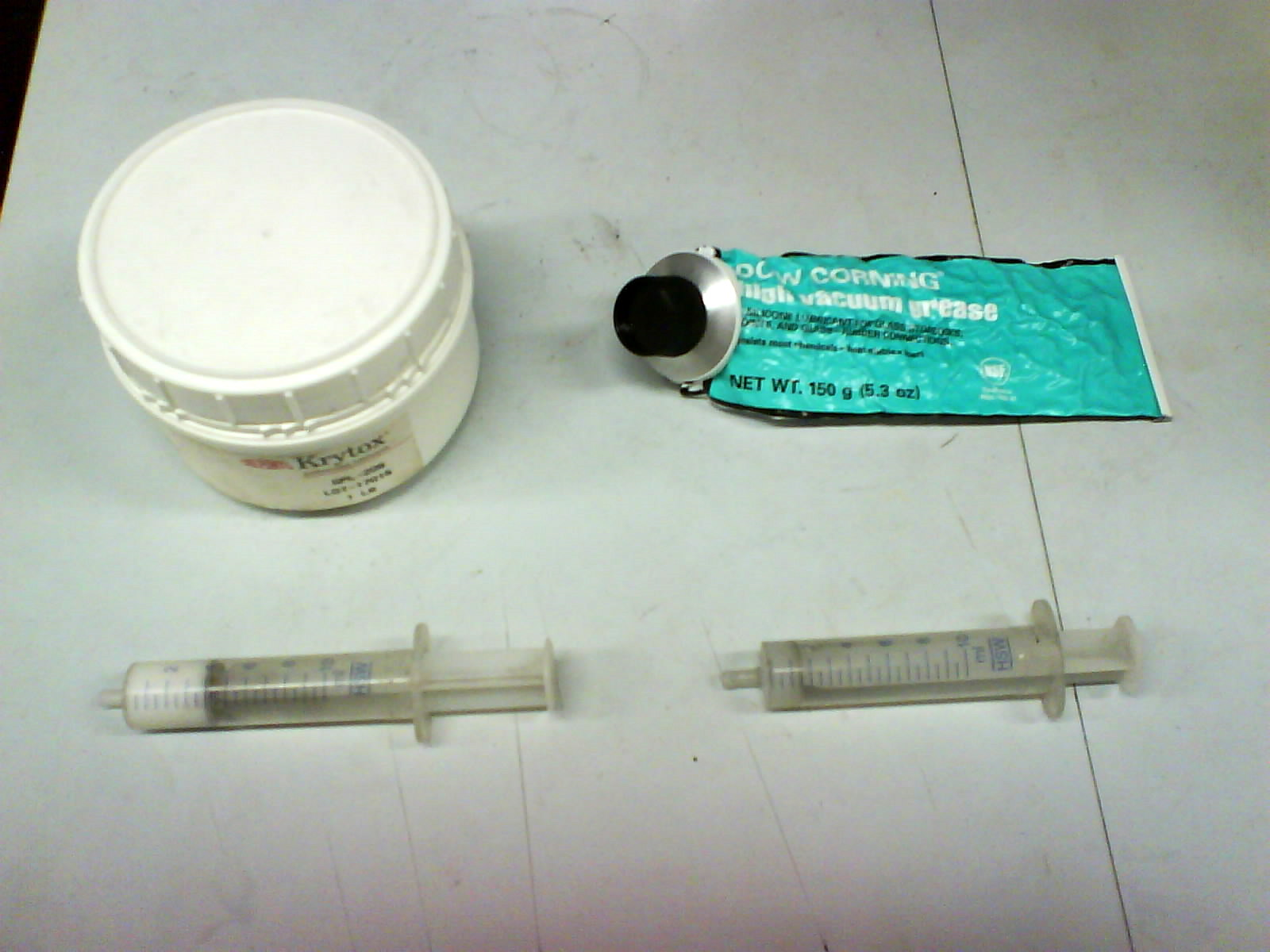
Krytox fluoroether-based grease pictured alongside a tube of Dow Corning silicone grease (green). Both are often used in laboratories, including in high-vacuum applications, due to their inertness.

Krytox, a registered trademark of The Chemours Company, is a group of colorless synthetic lubricants (oils and greases) with a variety of applications. Invented by researchers at DuPont, Krytox oils are fluorocarbon ether polymers of hexafluoropropylene oxide, with a chemical formula: F−(CF(CF_{3})−CF_{2}−O)_{n}−CF_{2}CF_{3}, where the degree of polymerization, n, generally lies within the range of 10 to 60. These compounds are collectively known by many names including perfluoropolyether (PFPE), perfluoroalkylether (PFAE), and perfluoropolyalkylether (PFPAE). A unique identifier is their CAS registry number, 60164-51-4.

In addition to PFPE, Krytox grease also contains telomers of PTFE and was designed as a liquid or grease form of PTFE. It is thermally stable, non-flammable (even in liquid oxygen), and insoluble in water, acids, bases, and most organic solvents. It is non-volatile and useful over a broad temperature range of −75 to 350 °C (−100 to 660 °F) or higher. Its high resistance to ionizing radiation makes it useful for the aerospace and nuclear industries. Formulations exist which are able to withstand extreme pressure, resist out-gassing in high vacuum, and operate under intense mechanical stress.

Other companies manufacture PFPE lubricants, such as Solvay's Fomblin range, with some formulations having comparable properties.

Structural formula of PFPE-K (Krytox)

== Safety ==
The manufacturer states on Krytox tubes, "May cause mild skin and eye irritation. Contact with very hot surfaces (above 500°F/260°C) can generate fumes which can cause coughing or respiratory irritation. Large amounts could lead to lung damage which might not be apparent for several hours. These fumes may also cause flu-like symptoms."
