= Perfluoro(methyl vinyl ether) =

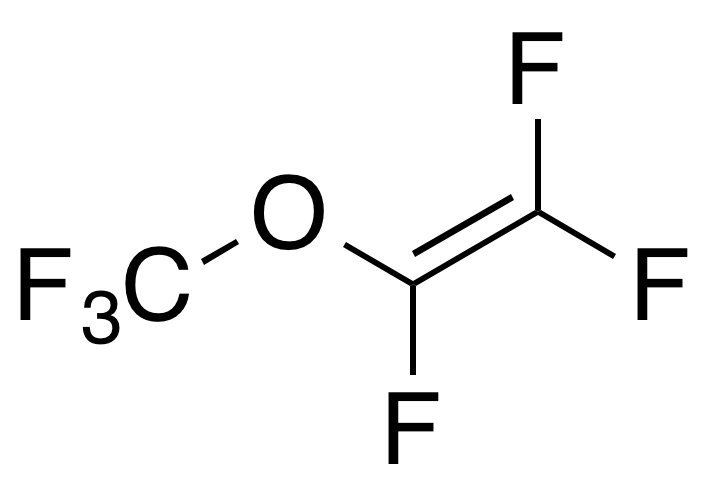

Names
- IUPAC name 1,1,2-trifluoro-2-(trifluoromethoxy)ethene
- Other names: Trifluoromethyl trifluorovinyl ether; Trifluoromethoxy trifluoroethylene

Identifiers
CAS Number	1187-93-5
3D model (JSmol)	Interactive image
Abbreviations	PMVE, PFMVE
ChemSpider	13820
ECHA InfoCard	100.013.367
EC Number	214-703-7
PubChem CID	14474
UNII	6II375V3XG
UN number	3153
CompTox Dashboard (EPA)	DTXSID3051599
- InChI: InChI=1S/C3F6O/c4-1(5)2(6)10-3(7,8)9 Key: BLTXWCKMNMYXEA-UHFFFAOYSA-N
- SMILES: C(=C(F)F)(OC(F)(F)F)F

Properties
Chemical formula	C_{3}F_{6}O
Molar mass	166.022 g·mol^{−1}
Appearance	colourless gas
Boiling point	−29 °C (−20 °F; 244 K)

Hazards
- GHS labelling
Pictograms	(GHS02: Flammable) (GHS04: Compressed Gas) (GHS07: Exclamation mark)
Signal word	Danger
Hazard statements	H220, H221, H280, H315, H319, H332, H335
Precautionary statements	P203, P210, P222, P261, P264, P264+P265, P271, P280, P302+P352, P304+P340, P305+P351+P338, P317, P319, P321, P332+P317, P337+P317, P362+P364, P377, P381, P403, P403+P233, P405, P410+P403, P501

Related compounds
Related compounds	Methyl vinyl ether
- Except where otherwise noted, data are given for materials in their standard state (at 25 °C [77 °F], 100 kPa). Infobox references

Perfluoro(methyl vinyl ether) is a perfluorinated compound with the formula CF_{3}OCF=CF_{2}. It is the simplest unsaturated perfluoroether. It is a precursor to fluoropolymers.

== Preparation ==
Preparation begins with hexafluoropropylene oxide (HFPO) and carbonyl fluoride over a metal fluoride catalyst. The fluoride reacts with the carbonyl, forming a perfluoroalkoxide anion. The anion attacks the electrophilic central carbon atom of HFPO in a nucleophilic ring-opening reaction similar to anionic polymerization. Elimination of fluoride regenerates the catalyst and yields perfluoro(2-methoxy propionyl fluoride). The acyl fluoride is then treated with potassium hydroxide to produce the perfluorocarboxylate. Decarboxylation via pyrolysis then yields the ether.

Sulfuryl fluoride adds across the double bond to give CF_{3}OCF(CF_{3})SO_{2}F.

== Safety and environmental ==
Its derivatives are included in the PFAS pollutants emitted by manufacturers of fluorocarbons.
