= Fluorinated ethylene propylene =

Polymer

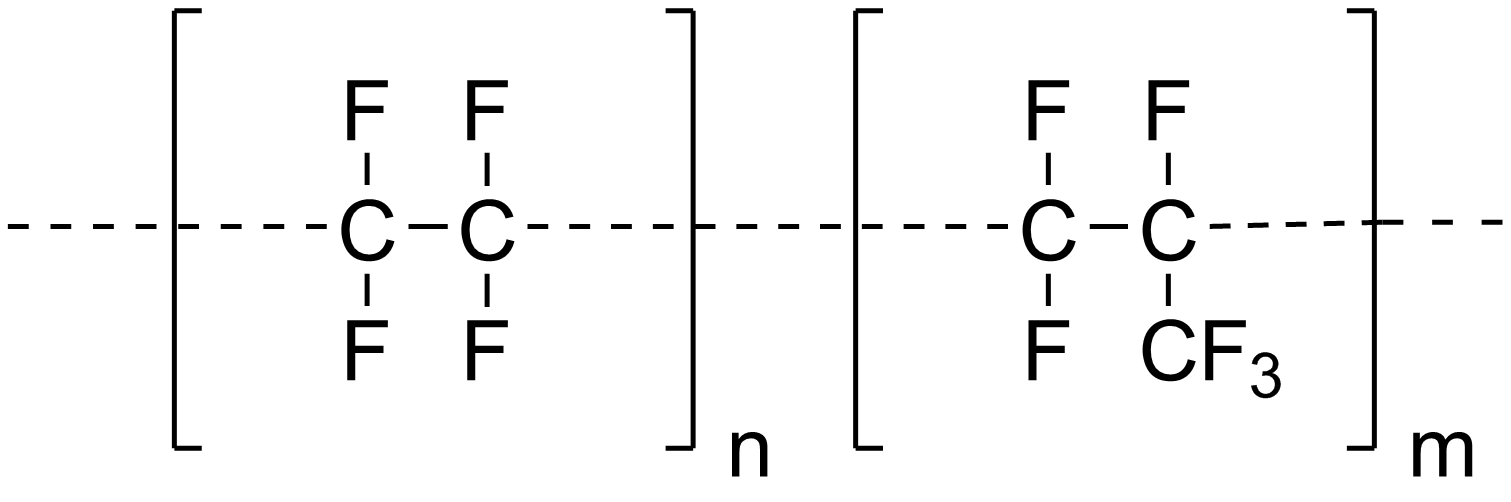
FEP
CAS Registry Number	25067-11-2
Density	2150 kg/m^{3}
Flexural modulus(E)	586 MPa
Tensile strength(_{t})	23 MPa
Elongation @ break	325%
Folding endurance	Varies
Notch test
Melting point	260 °C
Maximum operating
temperature	204 °C
Water absorption (ASTM)	<0.01 % after 24 hours
Dielectric constant (Dk)
at 1MHz	2.1
Dissipation factor
at 1MHz	0.0007
Arc resistance	< 300 seconds
Resistivity at 50% R.H.	> 10^{16} Ω m

Fluorinated ethylene propylene (FEP) is a copolymer of hexafluoropropylene and tetrafluoroethylene. It differs from the polytetrafluoroethylene (PTFE) resins in that it is melt-processable using conventional injection molding and screw extrusion techniques. Fluorinated ethylene propylene was invented by DuPont and is sold under the brandname Teflon FEP. Other brandnames are Neoflon FEP from Daikin or Dyneon FEP from Dyneon/3M.

FEP is very similar in composition to the fluoropolymers PTFE (polytetrafluoroethylene) and PFA (perfluoroalkoxy polymer resin). FEP and PFA both share PTFE's useful properties of low friction and non-reactivity, but are more easily formable. FEP is softer than PTFE and melts at 260 °C; it is highly transparent and resistant to sunlight.

== Production ==
FEP is produced by free-radical polymerization of mixtures of tetrafluoroethylene and hexafluoropropylene. The mixture is biased to compensate for the relatively low reactivity of the propylene component. The process is typically initiated with peroxydisulfate, which homolyzes to generate sulfate radicals. Because FEP is poorly soluble in almost all solvents, the polymerization is conducted as an emulsion in water, often using a surfactant such as perfluorooctanesulfonic acid (PFOS). The polymer contains about 5% of the propylene component.

== Properties ==
Useful comparison tables of PTFE against FEP, perfluoroalkoxy (PFA) and ethylene tetrafluoroethylene (ETFE) can be found on Chemours website, listing the mechanical, thermal, chemical, electrical and vapour properties of each, side by side.

In terms of corrosion resistance, FEP is the only other readily available fluoropolymer that can match PTFE's own resistance to caustic agents, as it is a pure carbon-fluorine structure and fully fluorinated.

Thermally, FEP stands out from PTFE and PFA by having a melting point of 260 °C (500 °F), around 40°C lower than PFA and lower again than PTFE.

Electrically, PTFE, FEP and PFA have identical dielectric constants, but FEP's dielectric strength is only surpassed by PFA. However, while PFA has a similar dissipation factor to PTFE, FEP's dissipation is around six times that of PFA and EFTE (making it a more non-linear conductor of electrostatic fields).

Mechanically, FEP is slightly more flexible than PTFE. It does not withstand repetitive folding as well as PTFE. It also features a higher coefficient of dynamic friction, is softer and has a slightly lower tensile strength than PTFE and PFA.

A noteworthy property of FEP is that it is vastly superior to PTFE in some coating applications involving exposure to detergents.

Ethylene tetrafluoroethylene (ETFE), in many ways, can be thought of as belonging to a different group, as it is essentially a high strength engineering version of the others featuring what are likely to be considered slightly diminished properties in the other fields when compared with PTFE, FEP and PFA.

== Applications ==
Like PTFE, FEP is mainly used for wiring, e.g. hookup wire, coaxial cable, wiring for computer wires and technical gear. An illustrative end product is for coaxial cables like RG-316.

In manufacturing high-quality composite parts, such as in the aerospace industry, FEP film can be used to protect parts during the curing process. In such applications, the film is called "release film" and is intended to prevent the curing adhesive polymer (e.g. the epoxy in a carbon fibre/epoxy composite laminate) from bonding to the vacuum bagging materials. Being able to maintain chemical composure in extreme temperatures and resist damage from chemical fuels further makes FEP a suitable choice in the industry.

Semi-finished products like pipes, round bars, and sheets for lining containment vessels, gas scrubbers, and tanks are being used in diverse applications in the chemical-processing industry to safely contain and distribute highly-aggressive chemical compounds.

Due to its flexibility, extreme resistance to chemical attack and optical transparency, this material, along with PFA is routinely used for plastic labware and tubing that involves critical or highly corrosive processes. Brand GmbH, Finemech, Savillex and Nalgene are well known laboratory suppliers that makes extensive use of the two materials.

It is also used in UV cured resin 3D printing. Due to the aforementioned properties of high optical transparency and low friction, it is ideally suited for use on the bottom of the resin reservoir (opposite the build plate). This allows for the ultraviolet light to penetrate into the resin, then after the layer has hardened, the build plate can move away pulling the hardened resin away from the FEP film.

The plastic is useful as a sample holder material in microscopy applications as its refractive index is close to that of water at visible wavelengths, (FEP: 1.344, water: 1.335). This minimizes the blur due to optical aberrations when the light traverses the sample container.
