= Nafion =

Brand name for a chemical product

- Chemical Structure of Nafion

Identifiers
CAS Number	66796-30-3
ChemSpider	none
PubChem CID	61889 monomer
CompTox Dashboard (EPA)	DTXSID30882013

Properties
Chemical formula	C_{7}HF_{13}O_{5}S . C_{2}F_{4}
Molar mass	See Article

Hazards
- GHS labelling
Pictograms	(GHS07: Exclamation mark)
Signal word	Warning
Hazard statements	H319, H335
Precautionary statements	P261, P264, P271, P280, P304+P340, P305+P351+P338, P312, P337+P313, P403+P233, P405, P501

Related compounds
Related compounds	Aciplex; Flemion; Dowex fumapem F
- Except where otherwise noted, data are given for materials in their standard state (at 25 °C [77 °F], 100 kPa). verify (what is ?) Infobox references

Nafion is a brand name for a sulfonated tetrafluoroethylene based fluoropolymer-copolymer synthesized in 1962 by Donald J. Connolly at the DuPont Experimental Station in Wilmington Delaware U.S. patent 3,282,875. Additional work on the polymer family was performed in the late 1960s by Walther Grot of DuPont. Nafion is a brand of the Chemours company. It is the first of a class of synthetic polymers with ionic properties that are called ionomers. Nafion's unique ionic properties are a result of incorporating perfluorovinyl ether groups terminated with sulfonate groups onto a tetrafluoroethylene (PTFE) backbone. Nafion has received a considerable amount of attention as a proton conductor for proton exchange membrane (PEM) fuel cells because of its excellent chemical and mechanical stability in the harsh conditions of this application.

The chemical basis of Nafion's ion-conductive properties remain a focus of extensive research. Ion conductivity of Nafion increases with the level of hydration. Exposure of Nafion to a humidified environment or liquid water increases the amount of water molecules associated with each sulfonic acid group. The hydrophilic nature of the ionic groups attract water molecules, which begin to solvate the ionic groups and dissociate the protons from the -SO_{3}H (sulfonic acid) group. The dissociated protons "hop" from one acid site to another through mechanisms facilitated by the water molecules and hydrogen bonding. Upon hydration, Nafion phase-separates at nanometer length scales resulting in formation of an interconnected network of hydrophilic domains which allow movement of water and cations, but the membranes do not conduct electrons and minimally conduct anions due to permselectivity (charge-based exclusion). Nafion can be manufactured with or exchanged to alternate cation forms for different applications (e.g. lithiated for Li-ion batteries) and at different equivalent weights (EWs), alternatively considered as ion-exchange capacities (IECs), to achieve a range of cationic conductivities with trade-offs to other physicochemical properties such as water uptake and swelling.

== Nomenclature and molecular weight ==
Nafion can be produced as both a powder resin and a copolymer. It has various chemical configurations and thus several chemical names in the IUPAC system. Nafion-H, for example, includes the following systematic names:

- From Chemical Abstracts: ethanesulfonyl fluoride, 2-[1-[difluoro-[(trifluoroethenyl)oxy]methyl]-1,2,2,2-tetrafluoroethoxy]-1,1,2,2,-tetrafluoro-, with tetrafluoroethylene
- tetrafluoroethylene-perfluoro-3,6-dioxa-4-methyl-7-octenesulfonic acid copolymer

The molecular weight of Nafion is variable due to differences in processing and solution morphology. The structure of a Nafion unit illustrates the variability of the material; for example, the most basic monomer contains chain variation between the ether groups (the z subscript). Conventional methods of determining molecular weight such as light scattering and gel permeation chromatography are not applicable because Nafion is insoluble, although the molecular weight has been estimated at 10^{5}–10^{6} Da. Instead, the equivalent weight (EW) and material thickness are used to describe most commercially available membranes. The EW is the number of grams of dry Nafion per mole of sulfonic acid groups when the material is in the acid form. Nafion membranes are commonly categorized in terms of their EW and thickness. For example, Nafion 117 indicates an extrusion-cast membrane with 1100 g/mol EW and 0.007 inches (7 thou) in thickness. In contrast to equivalent weight, conventional ion-exchange resins are usually described in terms of their ion exchange capacity (IEC), which is the multiplicative inverse or reciprocal of the equivalent weight, i.e., IEC = 1000/EW.

== Preparation ==
Nafion derivatives are first synthesized by the copolymerization of tetrafluoroethylene (TFE) (the monomer in Teflon) and a derivative of a perfluoro (alkyl vinyl ether) with sulfonyl acid fluoride. The latter reagent can be prepared by the pyrolysis of its respective oxide or carboxylic acid to give the olefinated structure.

The resulting product is an -SO_{2}F-containing thermoplastic that is extruded into films. Hot aqueous NaOH converts these sulfonyl fluoride (-SO_{2}F) groups into sulfonate groups (-SO_{3}^{−}Na^{+}). This form of Nafion, referred to as the neutral or salt form, is finally converted to the acid form containing the sulfonic acid (-SO_{3}H) groups. Nafion can be dispersed into solution by heating in aqueous alcohol at 250 °C in an autoclave for subsequent casting into thin films or use as polymeric binder in electrodes. By this process, Nafion can be used to generate composite films, coat electrodes, or repair damaged membranes.

== Properties ==
The combination of the stable PTFE backbone with the acidic sulfonic groups gives Nafion its characteristics:

- It is highly conductive to cations, making it suitable for many membrane applications.
- It resists chemical attack. According to Chemours, only alkali metals (particularly sodium) can degrade Nafion under normal temperatures and pressures.
- The PTFE backbone interlaced with the ionic sulfonate groups gives Nafion a high chemical stability temperature (e.g. 190 °C) but a softening point in the range of 85-100 °C give it a moderate operating temperature, e.g. up to 100 °C, with additional challenges in all applications due to the loss of water above 100 °C.
- It is a superacid catalyst. The combination of fluorinated backbone, sulfonic acid groups, and the stabilizing effect of the polymer matrix make Nafion a very strong acid, with pK_{a} ~ -6. In this respect Nafion resembles the trifluoromethanesulfonic acid, CF_{3}SO_{3}H, although Nafion is a weaker acid by at least three orders of magnitude.
- It is selectively and highly permeable to water.
- Its proton conductivity up to 0.2 S/cm depending on temperature, hydration state, thermal history and processing conditions.
- The solid phase and the aqueous phase of Nafion are both permeable to gases, which is a drawback for energy conversion devices such as artificial leaves, fuel cells, and water electrolyzers.

== Structure/morphology ==
The morphology of Nafion membranes is a matter of continuing study to allow for greater control of its properties. Other properties such as water management, hydration stability at high temperatures, electro-osmotic drag, as well as the mechanical, thermal, and oxidative stability, are affected by the Nafion structure. A number of models have been proposed for the morphology of Nafion to explain its unique transport properties.

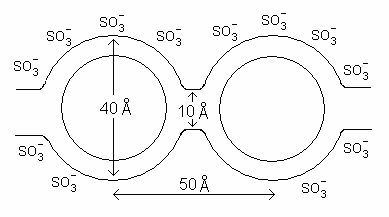
Cluster-network model

The first model for Nafion, called the cluster-channel or cluster-network model, consisted of an equal distribution of sulfonate ion clusters (also described as 'inverted micelles') with a 40 Å (4 nm) diameter held within a continuous fluorocarbon lattice. Narrow channels about 10 Å (1 nm) in diameter interconnect the clusters, which explains the transport properties.

The difficulty in determining the exact structure of Nafion stems from inconsistent solubility and crystalline structure among its various derivatives. Advanced morphological models have included a core-shell model where the ion-rich core is surrounded by an ion poor shell, a rod model where the sulfonic groups arrange into crystal-like rods, and a sandwich model where the polymer forms two layers whose sulfonic groups attract across an aqueous layer where transport occurs. Consistency between the models include a network of ionic clusters; the models differ in the cluster geometry and distribution. Although no model has yet been determined fully correct, some scientists have demonstrated that as the membrane hydrates, Nafion's morphology transforms from the cluster-channel model to a rod-like model.

A cylindrical-water channel model was also proposed based on simulations of small-angle X-ray scattering data and solid state nuclear magnetic resonance studies. In this model, the sulfonic acid functional groups self-organize into arrays of hydrophilic water channels, each ~ 2.5 nm in diameter, through which small ions can be easily transported. Interspersed between the hydrophilic channels are hydrophobic polymer backbones that provide the observed mechanical stability. Many recent studies, however, favored a phase-separated nanostructure consisting of locally-flat, or ribbon-like, hydrophilic domains based on evidence from direct-imaging studies and more comprehensive analysis of the structure and transport properties.

== Applications ==
Nafion's properties make it suitable for a broad range of applications. Nafion has found use in fuel cells, electrochemical devices, chlor-alkali production, metal-ion recovery, water electrolysis, plating, surface treatment of metals, batteries, sensors, Donnan dialysis cells, drug release, gas drying or humidification, and superacid catalysis for the production of fine chemicals. Nafion is also often cited for theoretical potential (i.e., thus far untested) in a number of fields. With consideration of Nafion's wide functionality, only the most significant will be discussed below.

=== Chlor-alkali production cell membrane ===
A chlor-alkali cell

Chlorine and sodium/potassium hydroxide are among the most produced commodity chemicals in the world. Modern production methods produce Cl_{2} and NaOH/KOH from the electrolysis of brine using a Nafion membrane between half-cells. Before the use of Nafion, industries used mercury containing sodium amalgam to separate sodium metal from cells or asbestos diaphragms to allow for transfer of sodium ions between half cells; both technologies were developed in the latter half of the 19th century. The disadvantages of these systems is worker safety and environmental concerns associated with mercury and asbestos, economical factors also played a part, and in the diaphragm process chloride contamination of the hydroxide product. Nafion was the direct result of the chlor-alkali industry addressing these concerns; Nafion could tolerate the high temperatures, high electrical currents, and corrosive environment of the electrolytic cells.

The figure to the right shows a chlor-alkali cell where Nafion functions as a membrane between half cells. The membrane allows sodium ions to transfer from one cell to the other with minimal electrical resistance. The membrane was also reinforced with additional membranes to prevent gas product mixing and minimize back transfer of Cl^{−} and ^{−}OH ions.

=== Proton exchange membrane (PEM) for fuel cells ===
Although fuel cells have been used since the 1960s as power supplies for satellites, recently they have received renewed attention for their potential to efficiently produce clean energy from hydrogen. Nafion was found effective as a membrane for proton exchange membrane (PEM) fuel cells by permitting hydrogen ion transport while preventing electron conduction. Solid Polymer Electrolytes, which are made by connecting or depositing electrodes (usually noble metal) to both sides of the membrane, conduct the electrons through an energy requiring process and rejoin the hydrogen ions to react with oxygen and produce water. Fuel cells are expected to find strong use in the transportation industry.

=== Superacid catalyst for fine chemical production ===
Nafion, as a superacid, has potential as a catalyst for organic synthesis. Studies have demonstrated catalytic properties in alkylation, isomerization, oligomerization, acylation, ketalization, esterification, hydrolysis of sugars and ethers, and oxidation. New applications are constantly being discovered. These processes, however, have not yet found strong commercial use. Several examples are shown below:

==== Alkylation with alkyl halides ====
Nafion-H gives efficient conversion whereas the alternative method, which employs Friedel-Crafts synthesis, can promote polyalkylation:

==== Acylation ====
The amount of Nafion-H needed to catalyze the acylation of benzene with aroyl chloride is 10–30% less than the Friedel-Crafts catalyst:

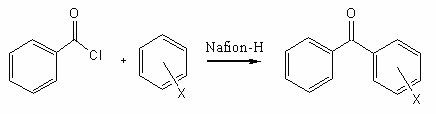

==== Catalysis of protection groups ====
Nafion-H increases reaction rates of protection via dihydropyran or o-trialkylsilation of alcohols, phenol, and carboxylic acids.

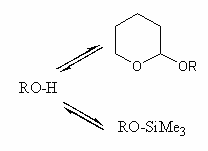

==== Isomerization ====
Nafion can catalyze a 1,2-hydride shift.

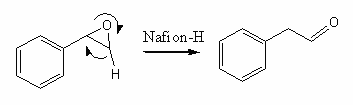

It is possible to immobilize enzymes within the Nafion by enlarging pores with lipophilic salts. Nafion maintains a structure and pH to provide a stable environment for the enzymes. Applications include catalytic oxidation of adenine dinucleotides.

=== Sensors ===
Nafion has found use in the production of sensors, with application in ion-selective, metallized, optical, and biosensors. What makes Nafion especially interesting is its demonstration in biocompatibility. Nafion has been shown to be stable in cell cultures as well as the human body, and there is considerable research towards the production of higher sensitivity glucose sensors.

=== Antimicrobial surfaces ===
Nafion surfaces show an exclusion zone against bacteria colonization. Moreover, layer-by-layer coatings comprising Nafion show excellent antimicrobial properties.

=== Biomedical applications of Nafion ===
A review of the literature describes the investigation of Nafion in a wide range of biomedical applications, including bioelectronic systems, energy harvesting, sensors, wearable electronics, tissue engineering, lab-on-a-chip platforms, implants, controlled drug delivery systems and antimicrobial surface coatings.

=== Dehumidification in spacecraft ===
The SpaceX Dragon 2 human-rated spacecraft uses Nafion membranes to dehumidify the cabin air. One side of the membrane is exposed to the cabin atmosphere, the other to the vacuum of space. This results in dehumidification since Nafion is permeable to water molecules but not air. This saves power and complexity since cooling is not required (as needed with a condensing dehumidifier), and the removed water is rejected to space with no additional mechanism needed.

== Modified Nafion for PEM fuel cells ==
Normal Nafion will dehydrate (thus lose proton conductivity) when the temperature is above ~80 °C. This limitation troubles the design of fuel cells because higher temperatures are desirable for better efficiency and CO tolerance of the platinum catalyst. Silica and zirconium phosphate can be incorporated into Nafion water channels through in situ chemical reactions to increase the working temperature to above 100 °C.
