= Chemours =

American chemical company

The Chemours Company
- Type: Public
- Traded as: NYSE: CC; S&P 600 component
- Industry: Chemical
- Founded: July 1, 2015; 11 years ago
- Headquarters: Wilmington, Delaware, U.S.
- Area served: Global
- Key people: Mary B. Cranston (chair); Denise Dignam (president & CEO)
- Products: Freon; Opteon; Teflon; Ti-Pure (titanium dioxide); Viton; Nafion; Krytox
- Revenue: US$5.8 billion (2025)
- Net income: ▼US$(386) million (2025)
- Total assets: ▼US$7.52 billion (2025)
- Total equity: ▼US$604 million (2025)
- Number of employees: 5,700 (2025)
- Website: chemours.com

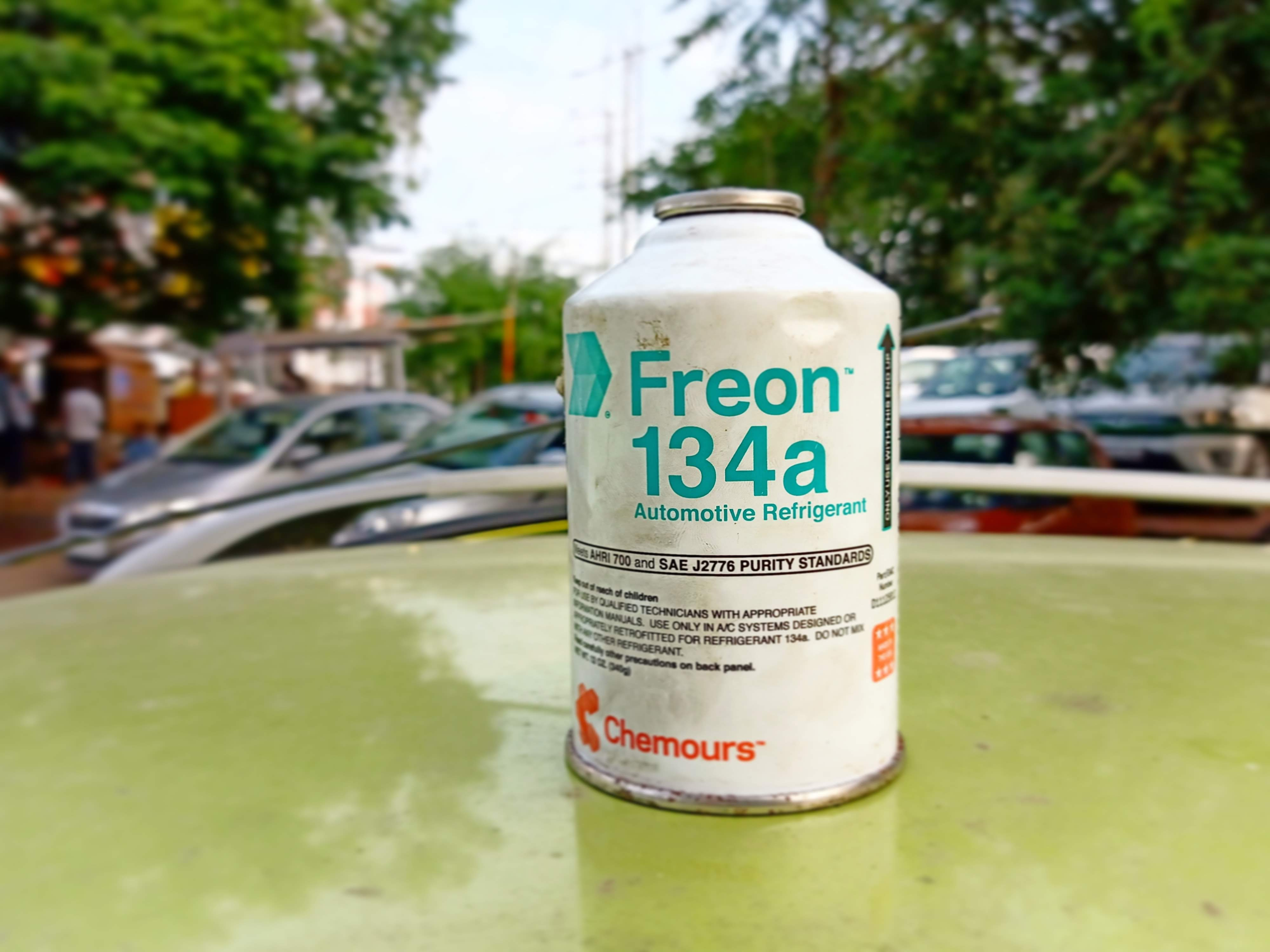
Freon 134a refrigerant for car AC

The Chemours Company (/kɛˈmɔːrz/, kem-ORZ), headquartered in Wilmington, Delaware, is an American chemical company. It was spun off from DuPont in July 2015. The company's primary products are refrigerants, titanium dioxide pigment, and industrial fluoropolymer resins. The company operates 28 major production facilities in 8 countries and serves approximately 2,400 customers in approximately 110 countries as of 2025.

Chemours manufactures and sells chemicals under three divisions: Thermal & Specialized Solutions, which produces refrigerants, thermal management products, propellants, foam blowing agents, and specialty solvents including Freon; Titanium Technologies, which produces titanium dioxide; and Advanced Performance Materials which produces membranes, industrial resins, and coatings under the brand names Teflon, Viton, Nafion, ECCtreme ECA, and Krytox.

Chemours is ranked the 594th on the Fortune 500 and 1534th on the Forbes Global 2000.

The name of the company is a portmanteau of the words "chemical" and "Nemours", derived from E. I. du Pont de Nemours & Co., the company's former parent.

The company has faced fines and regulations from its contamination of air, water, and soil with PFAS.

== History ==
On July 1, 2015, DuPont completed the corporate spin-off of Chemours, which began trading on the New York Stock Exchange.

Chemours assumed various liabilities arising from lawsuits against DuPont.

In February 2024, CEO Mark Newman, CFO Jonathan Lock, and Financial Controller Camela Wisel were placed on administrative leave by the board of directors due to delayed payments to some vendors to increase their bonuses, in violation of the company's standards for ethics.

== Legal and regulatory issues ==
Chemours' plant in Bladen County, North Carolina, was found to be dumping vast quantities of a chemical dubbed "GenX", a precursor of Teflon, into the Cape Fear River. This story is recounted in the 2018 documentary film The Devil We Know, which centers on Parkersburg, West Virginia, where the DuPont facility that manufactured Teflon was located. The documentary follows the personal stories and tribulations of several people who worked at the Parkersburg facility.

In September 2023, a court in the Netherlands found Chemours to be liable for pollution caused by the polytetrafluoroethylene (Teflon) producing plant in Dordrecht, South Holland. The court stated that Chemours' predecessor DuPont had willingly withheld crucial information between 1984 and 1998 about the harmful effects of the substances it used and emitted, which made the pollution unlawful.

=== PFAS-related settlements: Washington Works, Chambers Works, and other drinking water contamination ===
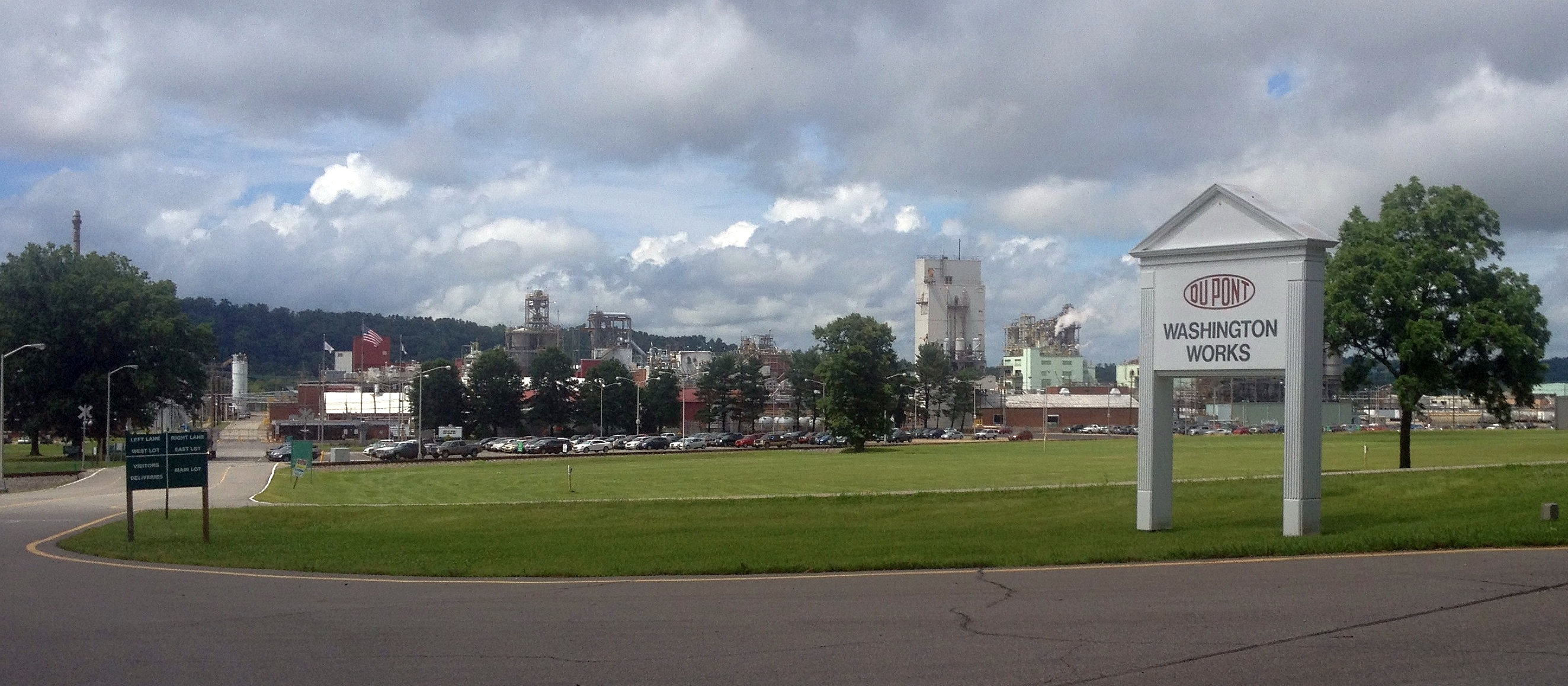
Entrance to Washington Works in Washington, West Virginia, formerly owned by DuPont, now owned by Chemours

Over the course of a century, DuPont was alleged to have dumped 100 million pounds of toxic chemicals into waterways in New Jersey and Delaware from its Chambers Works plant near Carneys Point Township, New Jersey. The property was transferred to Chemours in the corporate spin-off in July 2015. In 2016, Carneys Point Township, New Jersey initiated a $1.1 billion lawsuit against DuPont and Chemours, accusing DuPont of completing the corporate spin-off of Chambers Works into Chemours without first remediating the property as required by law.

In July 2021, Chemours, along with Corteva and DuPont, agreed to a $50 million settlement with Delaware. Chemours's share of the settlement was 50%.

In June 2023, Chemours, along with Corteva and DuPont, agreed to pay $1.2 billion in a national settlement to resolve all PFAS-related drinking water claims. Chemours's share of the settlement was 50%.

In November 2023, Chemours, along with Corteva and DuPont, agreed to a $110 million settlement with Ohio regarding PFAS-related claims, primarily from Washington Works. Chemours's share of the settlement was 50%.

In August 2025, Chemours, along with Corteva and DuPont, agreed to a $2 billion settlement with New Jersey to clean up 4 sites in New Jersey, including 2 industrial sites that discharged PFAS: Parlin and Chambers Works, as well as a shuttered munitions production plant in Pompton Lakes, New Jersey, and a facility that manufactured dynamite in Parlin, New Jersey. The settlement includes an $875 million payment to New Jersey and establishment of a $1.2 billion fund to clean up the 4 sites. Chemours's share of the settlement was 50%.
