= Fluoropolymer =

Type of polymer

A fluoropolymer is a fluorocarbon-based polymer with multiple carbon–fluorine bonds. It is characterized by a high resistance to solvents, acids, and bases. The best known fluoropolymer is polytetrafluoroethylene under the brand name "Teflon," trademarked by the DuPont Company.

== History ==
In 1938, polytetrafluoroethylene (DuPont brand name Teflon) was discovered by accident by a recently hired DuPont Ph.D., Roy J. Plunkett. While working with tetrafluoroethylene gas to develop refrigerants, he noticed that a previously pressurized cylinder had no pressure remaining. In dissecting the cylinder, he found a mass of white solid in a quantity similar to that of the tetrafluoroethylene gas. It was determined that this material was a new-to-the-world polymer. Tests showed the substance was resistant to corrosion from most acids, bases and solvents and had better high temperature stability than any other plastic. By early 1941, a crash program was making substantial quantities of PTFE for the Manhattan Project.

== Properties ==
Fluoropolymers share the properties of fluorocarbons in that they are not as susceptible to the van der Waals force as hydrocarbons. This contributes to their non-stick and friction reducing properties. Also, they are stable due to the stability multiple carbon–fluorine bonds add to a chemical compound. Fluoropolymers may be mechanically characterized as thermosets or thermoplastics. Fluoropolymers can be homopolymers or copolymers.

== Examples of monomers used to prepare fluoropolymers ==
- Perfluorocycloalkene (PFCA)
- Ethylene (Ethene, E)
- Vinyl fluoride (fluoroethylene) (VF1)
- Vinylidene fluoride (1,1-difluoroethylene) (VDF or VF2)
- Tetrafluoroethylene (TFE)
- Chlorotrifluoroethylene (CTFE)
- Propylene (Propene, P)
- Hexafluoropropylene (HFP)
- Perfluoropropylvinylether (PPVE)
- Perfluoro(methyl vinyl ether) (PMVE)

== Examples of fluoropolymers ==
| Fluoropolymer | Trade names | Monomers | Melting point (°C) |
|---|---|---|---|
| PVF (polyvinylfluoride) | Tedlar | VF1 | 200 |
| PVDF (polyvinylidene fluoride) | Kynar Solef Hylar | VF2 | 175 |
| PTFE (polytetrafluoroethylene) | Sold by AGC under the tradename Fluon PTFE; Sold by Dupont and Chemours Company under the tradename Teflon; sold by Solvay Specialty Polymers under the tradenames Algoflon Hyflon and Polymist; sold by Daikin under the tradename Polyflon | TFE | 327 |
| PCTFE (polychlorotrifluoroethylene) | Kel-F (3M), Neoflon (Daikin), Voltalef (Arkema) | CTFE | 220 |
| PFA, MFA (perfluoroalkoxy polymer) | Sold by AGC under the tradename Fluon PFA. Sold by DuPont under the tradename Teflon-PFA. Sold by Solvay Specialty Polymers under the tradename Hyflon. Neoflon (Daikin) | PPVE + TFE | 305 |
| FEP (fluorinated ethylene-propylene) | Sold by DuPont under the tradename Teflon FEP. Also known as Neoflon (Daikin) and Hyflon | HFP + TFE | 260 |
| ETFE (polyethylenetetrafluoroethylene) | Sold by AGC under the trade name of FluonETFE Tefzel,; sold by Daikin under the tradename Neoflon | TFE + E | 265 |
| ECTFE (polyethylenechlorotrifluoroethylene) | Halar sold by Solvay Specialty Polymers | CTFE + E | |
| FFPM/FFKM (Perfluorinated Elastomer [Perfluoroelastomer]) | Kalrez. Tecnoflon PFR DAI-EL (Daikin) | | |
| FPM/FKM (Fluoroelastomer [Vinylidene Fluoride based copolymers]) | Viton, Tecnoflon FKM, DAI-EL (Daikin), Fluonox (Gujarat Fluorochemicals Limited) | | |
| FEPM (Fluoroelastomer [Tetrafluoroethylene-Propylene]) | Sold by AGC under the trade name of AFLAS, | TFE + P | |
| PFPE (Perfluoropolyether) | Sold by DuPont under the tradename Krytox. Sold by Solvay Specialty Polymers S.p.A. as Fomblin and Galden | | |
| PFSA (Perfluorosulfonic acid) | Nafion | | |
| Perfluoropolyoxetane | | | |

== Typical properties ==
| Property | Method No. | Units | PTFE | FEP | PFA | ETFE | ECTFE | PCTFE | PVDF |
|---|---|---|---|---|---|---|---|---|---|
| Specific gravity | D792 | - | 2.17 | 2.15 | 2.15 | 1.7 | 1.7 | 2.15 | 1.78 |
| Yield strength | D638 | MPa | 10 | 12 | 15.5 | 24 | 31 | 40 | 46 |
| Yield strength | D638 | PSI | 1,450 | 1,740 | 2,250 | 3,480 | 4,500 | 5,800 | 6,670 |
| Elongation | | % | 200-500 | 250-350 | 300 | 200-500 | 200-300 | 80-250 | 20-150 |
| Tensile modulus | D638 | MPa | 600 | 500 | 700 | 1500 | 1655 | 1500 | 2400 |
| Tensile modulus | D638 | ksi | 87 | 72.5 | 101.5 | 217.5 | 240 | 218 | 348 |
| Hardness | D2240 | Shore D | 60 | 57 | 62 | 75 | 75 | 90 | 79 |
| HDT, @ 66 PSI | D648 | °F | 250 | 158 | 164 | 219 | 240 | 248 | 300 |
| HDT, @ 264 PSI | D648 | °F | 122 | 129 | 118 | 160 | 169 | - | 239 |
| Limiting oxygen index | D2863 | % | >95 | >95 | >95 | 30-36 | | | |
| Dielectric constant | D150 | 1 MHz | 2.1 | 2.1 | 2.1 | 2.6 | | | |

== See also ==
- Organofluorine
- Organohalogen
- Fluorosurfactant
- Perfluorocycloalkene (PFCA)
- Per- and polyfluoroalkyl substances (PFAS)
