= Hexafluoropropylene oxide =

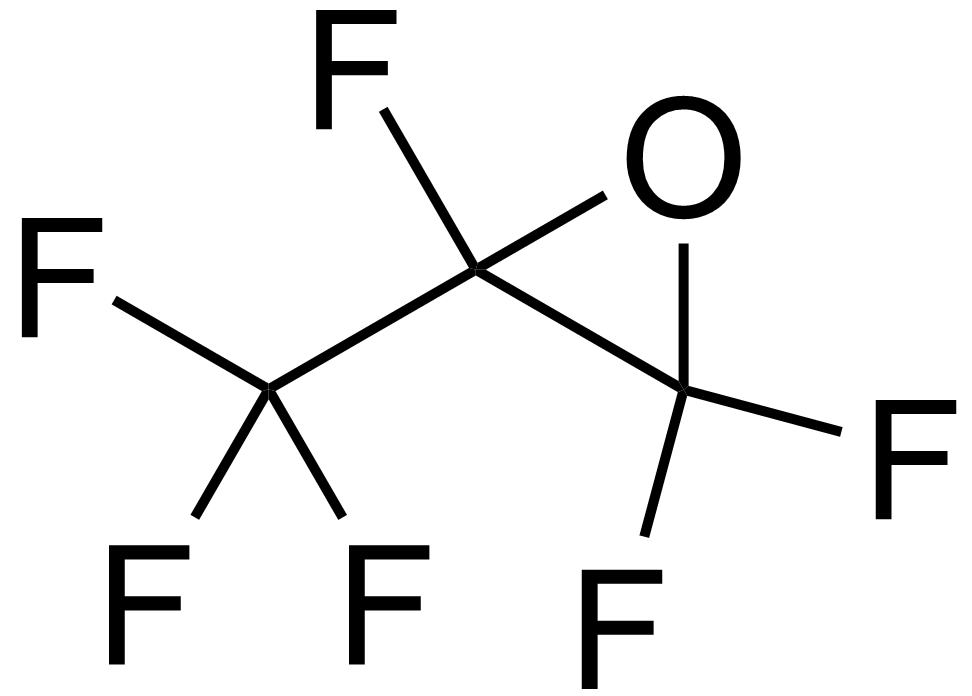

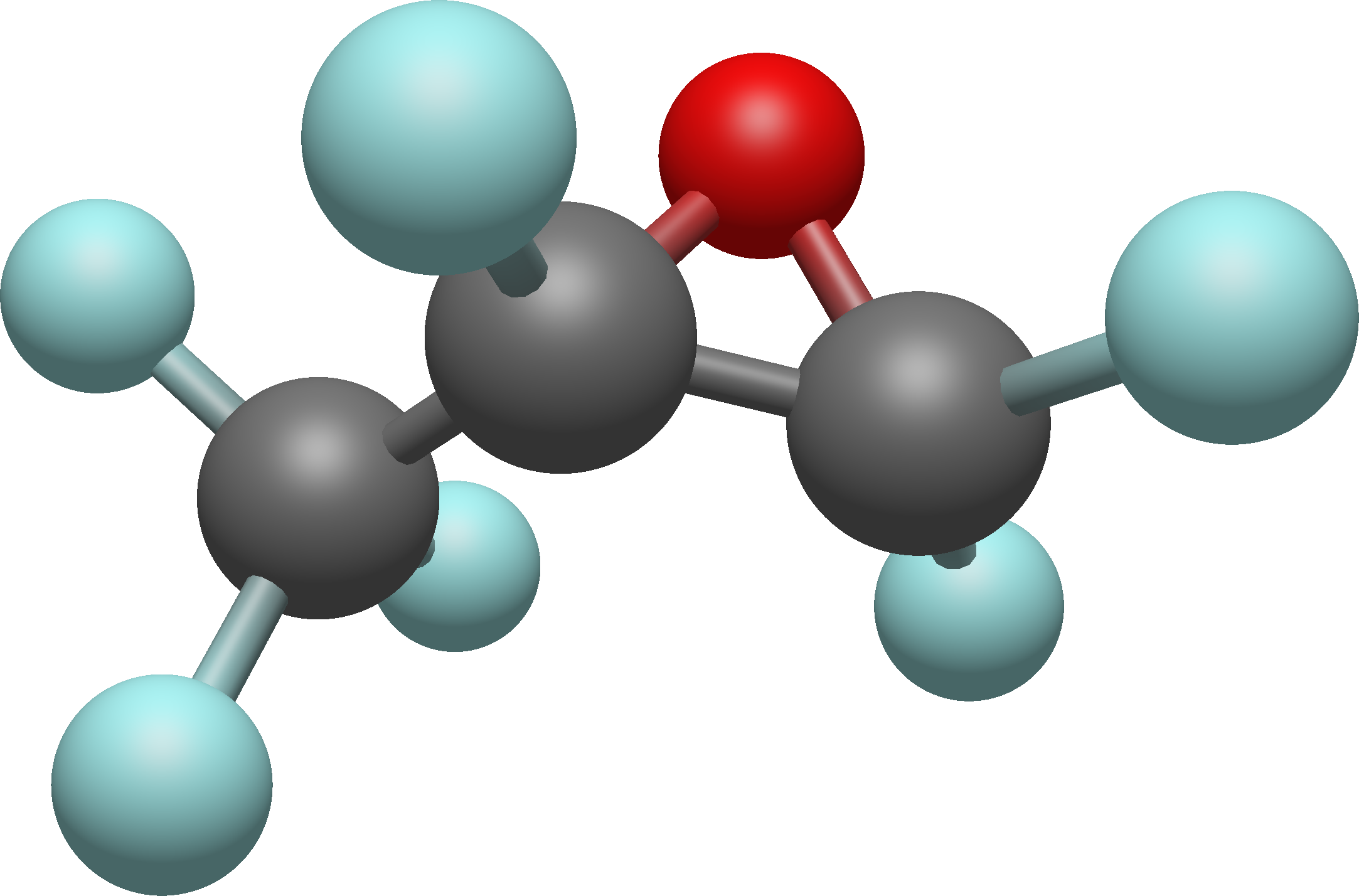

Names
- IUPAC name 2,2,3-Trifluoro-3-(trifluoromethyl)oxirane
- Other names trifluoro(trifluoromethyl)oxirane perfluoro(propylene oxide)

Identifiers
CAS Number	428-59-1
3D model (JSmol)	Interactive image; Interactive image
Abbreviations	HFPO
ChemSpider	9499
ECHA InfoCard	100.006.411
PubChem CID	9883
UNII	JPY12AP87N
CompTox Dashboard (EPA)	DTXSID6029177
- InChI: InChI=1S/C3F6O/c4-1(2(5,6)7)3(8,9)10-1 Key: PGFXOWRDDHCDTE-UHFFFAOYSA-N; InChI=1/C3F6O/c4-1(2(5,6)7)3(8,9)10-1 Key: PGFXOWRDDHCDTE-UHFFFAOYAQ
- SMILES: C1(C(O1)(F)F)(C(F)(F)F)F; FC(F)(F)C1(F)OC1(F)F

Properties
Chemical formula	C_{3}F_{6}O
Molar mass	166.02 g/mol
Appearance	colourless gas
Density	1300kg/m3 at 25 °C
Melting point	−144 °C (−227 °F; 129 K)
Boiling point	−27.4 °C (−17.3 °F; 245.8 K)
Solubility	nonpolar solvents
Vapor pressure	660kPa at 25 °C
- Except where otherwise noted, data are given for materials in their standard state (at 25 °C [77 °F], 100 kPa). verify (what is ?) Infobox references

Hexafluoropropylene oxide (HFPO) is an intermediate used in industrial organofluorine chemistry; specifically it is a monomer for fluoropolymers. This colourless gas is the epoxide of hexafluoropropylene, which is a fluorinated analog of propylene oxide, HFPO is produced by Chemours and 3M and as a precursor to the lubricant Krytox and related materials. It is generated by oxidation of perfluoropropylene, e.g. with oxygen as well as other oxidants.

== Reactivity ==
Fluoride catalyzes the formation of perfluorinated polyethers such as Krytox. The initial step entails nucleophilic attack at the middle carbon to give the perfluoropropoxide anion, which in turn attacks another monomer. This process generates a polymer terminated by an acyl fluoride, which is hydrolyzed to the carboxylic acid which is decarboxylated with fluorine. The net polymerization reaction can be represented as:

n + 2 CF_{3}CFCF_{2}O → CF_{3}CF_{2}CF_{2}O(CF(CF_{3})CF_{2}O)_{n}CF_{2}CF_{3} + CO

Upon heating above 150 °C, HFPO decomposes to trifluoroacetyl fluoride and difluorocarbene:

CF_{3}CFCF_{2}O → CF_{3}C(O)F + CF_{2}

The epoxide of tetrafluoroethylene is even more unstable with respect to trifluoroacetyl fluoride.

In the presence of Lewis acids the compound rearranges to hexafluoroacetone (HFA), another important chemical intermediate. This rearrangement can be of concern during storage as the rearrangement be catalyzed by the material of the storage cylinder's walls and leads to unwanted formation of HFA during storage. As a result of this, 3M recommends using all HFPO shipped in carbon-steel containers within 90 days of shipping.

Methanolysis affords methyl trifluoropyruvate, a reagent useful in organic synthesis:

CF_{3}CFCF_{2}O + 2 CH_{3}OH → CF_{3}C(O)CO_{2}Me + CH_{3}F + 2 HF

HFPO is a precursor to perfluoroalkyl ether sulfonic acids.
