= Perfluorosulfonic acids =

Chemical compounds

Perfluorooctanesulfonic acid

Perfluorosulfonic acids (PFSAs) are chemical compounds of the formula C_{n}F_{(2n+1)}SO_{3}H and thus belong to the family of perfluorinated and polyfluorinated alkyl compounds (PFASs). The simplest example of a perfluorosulfonic acid is the trifluoromethanesulfonic acid. Perfluorosulfonic acids with six or more perfluorinated carbon atoms, i.e. from perfluorohexanesulfonic acid onwards, are referred to as long-chain.

Trifluoromethanesulfonic acid

== Properties ==
Perfluorosulfonic acids are organofluoroanalogues of conventional alkanesulfonic acids, but they are several pK_{A} units stronger (and are therefore strong acids). Their perfluoroalkyl chain has a highly hydrophobic character.

== Use ==
Perfluorooctanesulfonic acid, for example, has been used in hard chromium plating. Since the early 2000's 6:2 fluorotelomersulfonic acid has been used as a replacement for perfluorooctanesulfonic acid.

PFSA resins are specialty polymers consisting of a fluoropolymer backbone of polytetrafluoroethylene with a side chain of perfluorinated vinyl ether comonomer bearing sulfonic acid functional groups. The side chain may vary in length, which imparts different properties. These polymers are used as membranes in fuel cells and water electrolyzers for example. Chemical brand names include Nafion, Aquivion, and Fumapen.

== Regulation ==
Perfluorooctanesulfonic acid was included in Annex B of the Stockholm Convention in 2009 and subsequently in the EU POPs Regulation.

Perfluorohexanesulfonic acid was included in Annex A of the Stockholm Convention in 2022.

== Examples ==
Name	Abbreviation	Structural formula	Molecular weight (g/mol)	CAS No.
Perfluoropropanesulfonic acid	PFPrS	C_{3}F_{7}SO_{3}H	250.09	423-41-6
Perfluorobutanesulfonic acid	PFBS	C_{4}F_{9}SO_{3}H	300.10	375-73-5
Perfluoropentanesulfonic acid	PFPS	C_{5}F_{11}SO_{3}H	350.11	2706-91-4
Perfluorohexanesulfonic acid	PFHxS	C_{6}F_{13}SO_{3}H	400.12	355-46-4
Perfluoroheptanesulfonic acid	PFHpS	C_{7}F_{15}SO_{3}H	450.12	375-92-8
Perfluorooctanesulfonic acid	PFOS	C_{8}F_{17}SO_{3}H	500.13	1763-23-1
Perfluorononanesulfonic acid	PFNS	C_{9}F_{19}SO_{3}H	550.14	68259-12-1
Perfluorodecanesulfonic acid	PFDS	C_{10}F_{21}SO_{3}H	600.15	335-77-3

== See also ==
- Perfluoro(4-ethylcyclohexane)sulfonic acid, a cyclic analogue

== Literature ==
- OECD, ed. (2022), "3. Perfluoroalkane sulfonic (a) and sulfinic (b) acids", Fact Cards of Major Groups of Per- and Polyfluoroalkyl Substances (PFASs), OECD Environment, Health and Safety Publications 68 Series on Risk Management, pp. 31–41
