= PFAS litigation and regulations by country =

Regulatory actions and policy initiatives have been adopted in many countries to reduce the prevalence of per- and polyfluoroalkyl substances (PFAS) and the harm they cause to health and the environment. This article lists such actions by jurisdiction. PFAS have also been the subject of multiple lawsuits worldwide. In the United States, settlements stemming from PFAS pollution claims have reached $18 billion by 2024. In 2023, Sweden's Supreme Court set a legal precedent by awarding damages to citizens who were supplied PFAS contaminated drinking water.

== Australia ==
In 2017, the ABC's current affairs program Four Corners reported that the storage and use of firefighting foams containing perfluorinated surfactants at Australian Defence Force facilities around Australia had contaminated nearby water resources. In 2019, remediation efforts at RAAF Base Tindal and the adjacent town of Katherine were ongoing. In the 2022 Australian federal budget $428 million was allocated for works at HMAS Albatross, RAAF Base Amberley, RAAF Base Pearce and RAAF Base Richmond including funding to remediate PFAS contamination. As of 2026, "Australia [... is suing] 3M for $2bn over 'forever chemicals' in firefighting foam", according to a media outlet.

== Canada ==
Although PFAS are not manufactured in Canada, they may be present in imported goods and products. In 2008, products containing PFOS as well as PFOA were banned in Canada, with exceptions for products used in firefighting, the military, and some forms of ink and photo media.

Health Canada has published drinking water guidelines for maximum concentrations of PFOS and PFOA to protect the health of Canadians, including children, over a lifetime's exposure to these substances. The maximum allowable concentration for PFOS under the guidelines is 0.0002 milligrams per liter. The maximum allowable concentration for PFOA is 0.0006 milligrams per liter. In August 2024, Health Canada established an objective of 30 ng/L for the sum of the concentration of 25 PFAS detected in drinking water.

== European Union ==
Many PFAS are either not covered by European legislation or are excluded from registration obligations under the EU Registration, Evaluation, Authorisation and Restriction of Chemicals (REACH) chemical regulation. Several PFAS have been detected in drinking water, municipal wastewater, and landfill leachates worldwide.

In 2019, the European Council requested the European Commission to develop an action plan to eliminate all non-essential uses of PFAS due to the growing evidence of adverse effects caused by exposure to these substances; the evidence for the widespread occurrence of PFAS in water, soil, articles, and waste; and the threat it can pose to drinking water. Germany, the Netherlands, Denmark, Norway, and Sweden submitted a restriction proposal based on the REACH regulation to achieve a European ban on the production, use, sale and import of PFAS. The proposal states that a ban is necessary for all use of PFAS, with different periods for different applications when the ban takes effect (immediately after the restriction comes into force, five years afterward, or 12 years afterward), depending on the function and the availability of alternatives. The European Chemicals Agency (ECHA) described it as "the most extensive [chemical restriction] in the history of the EU". The proposal has not assessed the use of PFAS in medicines, plant protection products, and biocides because specific regulations apply to those substances (Biocidal Products Regulation, Plant Protection Products Regulation, Medicinal Products Regulation) that have an explicit authorization procedure that focuses on risk for health and the environment. The proposal was submitted on 13 January 2023 and published by the European Chemicals Agency (ECHA) on 7 February. From 22 March to 21 September, citizens, companies, and other organizations commented on the proposal during a public consultation. Based on the information in the restriction proposal and the consultation, two committees from ECHA formulate an opinion on the risk and socio-economic aspects of the proposed restriction. Within a year of publication, the opinions are sent to the European Commission, which makes a final proposal that is submitted to the EU Member States for discussion and decision. Eighteen months after the publication of the restriction decision (which may differ from the original proposal), it will enter into force. In 2025, the "background document" for the proposed restriction, incorporating comments from thousands of stakeholders, was published.

The REACH Committee for Socio-Economic Analysis (SEAC) is expected to adopt its final opinion on the proposal and submit it to the European Commission by the end of 2026. This step "will conclude ECHA's scientific evaluation of the proposed restriction" (see REACH authorisation procedure).

The chemical industry organisation ChemSec has noted that PFAS are used extensively and called for transitional periods for the implementation of restrictions so that supply chains can adapt: "the transition period will be crucial ... even 12 years won't be long enough" in some cases.

=== Italy ===
An estimated 127,000 residents in the Veneto region have been exposed to contamination through tap water, in what is thought to be Europe's biggest PFAS-related environmental disaster. While Italy's National Health Institute (ISS, Istituto Superiore di Sanità) set the threshold limit of PFOA in the bloodstream at 8 nanograms per milliliter (ng/mL), some residents had reached 262 and some industrial employees reach 91,900 ng/mL. In 2021 some data was disclosed by Greenpeace and local citizens after a long legal battle against the Veneto Region and ISS, which for years has denied access to data, despite values known since or even before 2017. The Veneto region has not carried out further monitoring or taken resolutive actions to eliminate pollution and reduce, at least gradually, the contamination of non-potable water. Although in 2020 the European Food Safety Agency (EFSA) has reduced by more than four times the maximum tolerable limit of PFAS that can be taken through the diet, the region has not carried out new assessments or implemented concrete actions to protect the population and the agri-food and livestock sectors. Some limits were added to monitoring the geographical area, which does not include the orange zone and other areas affected by contamination, as well as the insufficiency of analysis on important productions widespread in the areas concerned: eggs (up to 37,100 ng/kg), fish (18,600 ng/kg) spinach and radicchio (only one sampling carried out), kiwis, melons, watermelons, cereals (only one sample was analyzed), soy, wines and apples.

=== Sweden ===
Sweden has up to 90 thousand areas contaminated by PFAS, which is a serious environmental issue, according to Swedish Environmental Protection Agency.

Highly contaminated drinking water has been detected at several locations in Sweden. Such locations include Arvidsjaur, Lulnäset, Uppsala and Visby. In 2013, PFAS were detected at high concentrations in one of the two municipality drinking water treatment plants in the town of Ronneby, in southern Sweden. Concentrations of PFHxS and PFOS were found at 1700 ng/L and 8000 ng/L, respectively. The source of contamination was later found to be a military fire-fighting exercise site in which PFAS-containing fire-fighting foam had been used since the mid-1980s.

Additionally, low-level contaminated drinking water has also been shown to be a significant exposure source of PFOA, PFNA, PFHxS and PFOS for Swedish adolescents (ages 10–21). Even though the median concentrations in the municipality drinking water were below one ng/L for each individual PFAS, positive associations were found between adolescent serum PFAS concentrations and PFAS concentrations in drinking water.

== Japan ==
A study of public water bodies ending in March 2022 showed that the sum of PFOS and PFOA concentrations exceeded 50 ng/L in 81 out of 1,133 test sites and in some cases are present at elevated levels in blood. This has led to pressure to increase regulations.

== New Zealand ==
The Environmental Protection Authority (New Zealand) has banned the use of PFAS in cosmetic products starting from 31 December 2026. This will make the country one of the first in the world to take this step on PFAS to protect people and the environment.

== United Kingdom ==
The environmental consequences of PFAS, especially from firefighting activities, have been recognized since the mid-1990s and came to prominence after the Buncefield explosion on 11 December 2005. The Environment Agency has undertaken a series of projects to understand the scale and nature of PFAS in the environment. The Drinking Water Inspectorate requires water companies to report concentrations of 47 PFAS.

== United States ==
An estimated 26,000 U.S. sites are contaminated with PFAS. More than 200 million Americans are estimated to live in places where the PFAS level in tap water, including PFOA and PFOS levels, exceeds the 1 ppt (part per trillion) limit set in 2022 by the U.S. Environmental Protection Agency (EPA).

Based on tap water studies from 716 locations from 2016 and 2021, the U.S. Geological Survey (USGS) found that the PFAS levels exceeded the EPA advisories in approximately 75% of the samples from urban areas and in approximately 25% of the rural area samples.

Certain PFAS are no longer manufactured in the United States as a result of phase-outs including the PFOA Stewardship Program (2010–2015), in which eight major chemical manufacturers agreed to eliminate the use of PFOA and PFOA-related chemicals in their products and emissions from their facilities. However, they are still produced internationally and are imported into the U.S. in consumer goods. Some types of PFAS are voluntarily not included in food packaging.

In 2021, Senators Susan Collins of Maine and Richard Blumenthal of Connecticut proposed the No PFAS in Cosmetics Act in the United States Senate. The bill was also introduced in the United States House of Representatives by Michigan Representative Debbie Dingell, but the Republican Party, supported by the U.S. chemical industry filibustered the bill.

In February 2025, Minnesota became the first state to ban the sale of cookware containing PFAS.

In 2026, Tyco Fire Products agreed to a $10 million settlement with Wisconsin to resolve the 2022 lawsuit regarding PFAS water contamination in the Marinette and Peshtigo areas. The deal required funding for environmental cleanup, continuous monitoring, and the provision of clean water to affected residents for 20 years.

=== Military bases ===
The water in and around at least 126 U.S. military bases has been contaminated by high levels of PFAS because of their use of firefighting foams since the 1970s, according to a study by the U.S. Department of Defense. Of these, 90 bases reported PFAS contamination that had spread to drinking water or groundwater off the base.

In 2022, a report by the Pentagon acknowledged that approximately 175,000 U.S. military personnel at two dozen American military facilities drank water contaminated by PFAS that exceeded the U.S. EPA limit. However, according to the Environmental Working Group, the Pentagon report downplayed the number of people exposed to PFAS, which was probably over 640,000 at 116 military facilities. The EWG found that the Pentagon also omitted from its report some types of diseases that are likely to be caused by PFAS exposure, such as testicular cancer, kidney disease, and fetal abnormalities.

=== Environmental Protection Agency actions ===
The EPA published non-enforceable drinking water health advisories for PFOA and PFOS, initially in 2020. Drinking water utilities are required to monitor PFAS levels and may receive grants to do so. There are also regulations regarding wastewater (effluent guidelines) for industries that use PFAS in the manufacturing process as well as biosolids (processed wastewater sludge used as fertilizer).

The EPA issued health advisories for four specific PFAS in June 2022, significantly lowering their safe threshold levels for drinking water. The PFOA threshold level was reduced from 70 ppt to 0.004 ppt, while the level for PFOS was reduced from 70 ppt to 0.02 ppt. A safe level for the compound GenX was set at 10 ppt, while that for PFBS was set at 2000 ppt. While not enforceable, these health advisories are intended to be acted on by states in setting their own drinking water standards.

In August 2022, the EPA proposed to add PFOA and PFOS to its list of hazardous substances under the Superfund law. EPA issued a final rule in April 2024, which requires that polluters pay for investigations and cleanup of these substances.

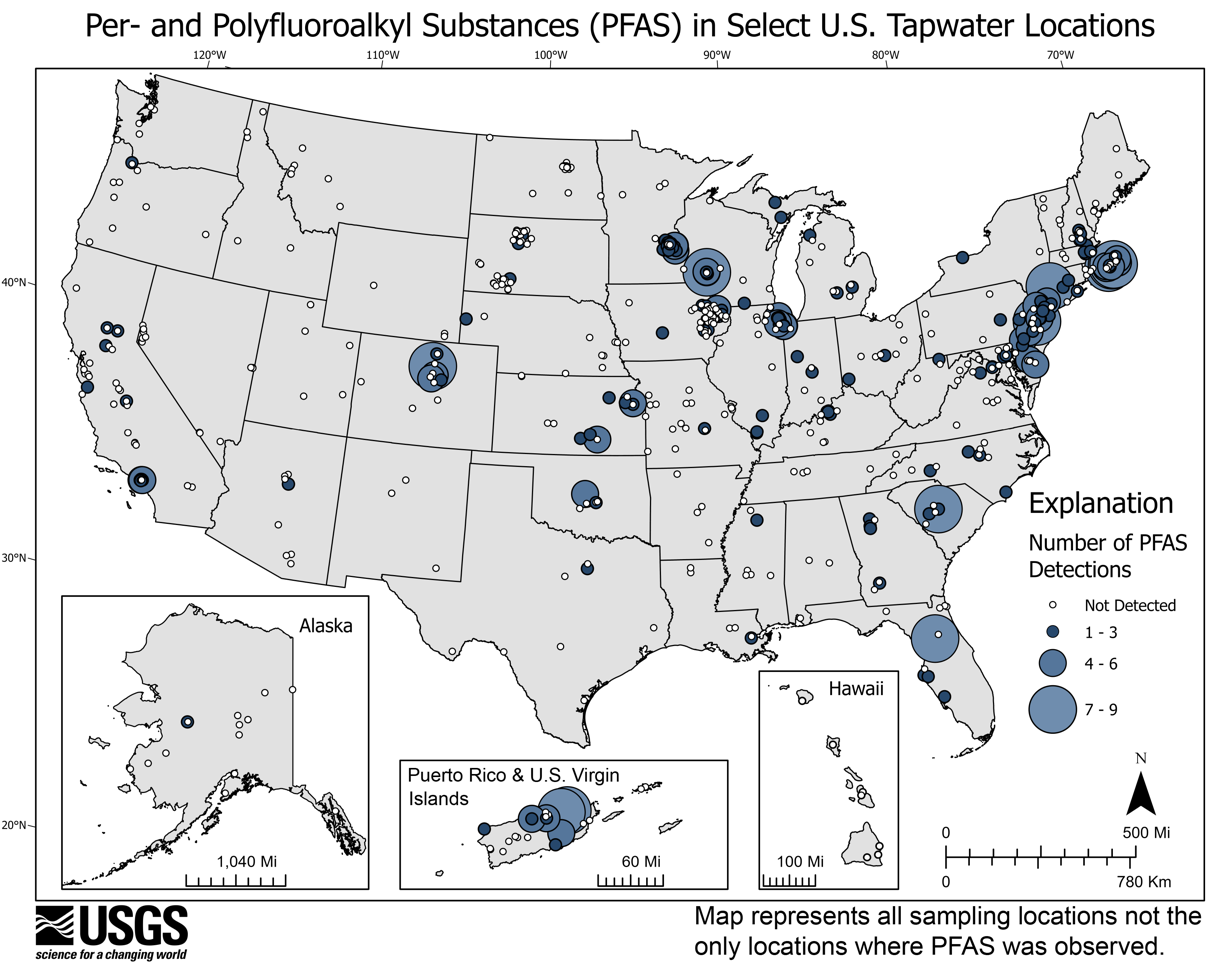
USGS map showing the number of PFAS detections in tap water samples from select sites across the U.S.

In April 2024, the EPA issued a final drinking water rule for PFOA, PFOS, GenX, PFBS, PFNA, and PFHxS. Within three years, public water systems must remove these six PFAS to near-zero levels. States may be awarded grants up to $1 billion in aid to help with the initial testing and treatment of water for this purpose. The updated toxicity assessments in the 2024 rule supersede the 2022 health advisories for PFOA and PFOS.

=== Legal actions ===
In February 2017, DuPont and Chemours (a DuPont spin-off) agreed to pay $671 million to settle lawsuits arising from 3,550 personal injury claims related to the releasing of PFAS from their Parkersburg, West Virginia, plant into the drinking water of several thousand residents. This was after a court-created independent scientific panel—the C8 Science Panel—found a "probable link" between C8 exposure and six illnesses: kidney and testicular cancer, ulcerative colitis, thyroid disease, pregnancy-induced hypertension and high cholesterol.

In October 2018, a class action suit was filed by an Ohio firefighter against several producers of fluorosurfactants, including 3M and DuPont, on behalf of all U.S. residents who may have adverse health effects from exposure to PFAS. The story is told in the film Dark Waters.

In June 2023, 3M reached a US$10.3 billion settlement with several US public water providers to resolve water pollution claims tied to PFAS, while Chemours, DuPont and Corteva settled similar claims for $1.19 billion.

In December 2023, as part of a four-year legal battle, the EPA banned Inhance, a Houston, Texas-based manufacturer that produces an estimated 200 million containers annually with a process that creates PFOA, from using the manufacturing process. In March 2024, the United States Court of Appeals for the Fifth Circuit overturned the ban. While the court did not deny the containers' health risks, it said that the EPA could not regulate the manufactured containers under Toxic Substances Control Act of 1976, which only addresses "new" chemicals.

In September 2026, North Carolina and 11 communities settled further litigation related to the 2023 lawsuit against Chemours, DuPont and Corteva, which alleged that Chemours' Fayetteville Works facility had leaked PFAS. Half of the $455 million settlement was assigned to Chemours for payment.

=== State actions ===
In 2021, Maine became the first U.S. state to ban these compounds in all products by 2030, except for instances deemed "currently unavoidable".

As of October 2020, the states of California, Connecticut, Massachusetts, Michigan, Minnesota, New Hampshire, New Jersey, New York, Vermont, and Wisconsin had enforceable drinking water standards for between two and six types of PFAS. The six chemicals (termed by the Massachusetts Department of Environmental Protection as PFAS6) are measured either individually or summed as a group depending on the standard; they are:

- Perfluorooctanesulfonic acid (PFOS)
- Perfluorooctanoic acid (PFOA)
- Perfluorohexanesulfonic acid (PFHxS)
- Perfluorononanoic acid (PFNA)
- Perfluoroheptanoic acid (PFHpA)
- Perfluorodecanoic acid (PFDA)

In 2021, California banned PFAS for use in food packaging and from infant and children's products and also required PFAS cookware in the state to carry a warning label.

A program licensed and promoted by the Maine Department of Environmental Protection that provided free municipal wastewater sludge (biosolids) to farmers as fertilizer has resulted in PFAS contamination of local drinking water and farm-grown produce.

The Michigan PFAS Action Response Team (MPART) was launched in 2017 and is the first multi-agency action team of its kind in the nation. Agencies representing health, environment, and other branches of state government have joined to investigate sources and locations of PFAS contamination in the state, take action to protect people's drinking water, and keep the public informed. Groundwater is tested at locations throughout the state by various parties to ensure safety, compliance with regulations, and proactively detect and remedy potential problems. In 2010, the Michigan Department of Environmental Quality (MDEQ) discovered levels of PFAS in groundwater monitoring wells at the former Wurtsmith Air Force Base. In 2024, citizen-led testing near the base in Oscoda discovered high levels of PFAS in foam along the shore of Lake Huron. As additional information became available from other national testing, Michigan expanded its investigations into other locations where PFAS compounds were potentially used. In 2018, the MDEQ's Remediation and Redevelopment Division (RRD) established cleanup criteria for groundwater used as drinking water of 70 ppt of PFOA and PFOS, individually or combined. The RRD staff are responsible for implementing these criteria as part of their ongoing efforts to clean up sites of environmental contamination. The RRD staff are the lead investigators at most of the PFAS sites on the MPART website and also conduct interim response activities, such as coordinating bottled water or filter installations with local health departments at sites under investigation or with known PFAS concerns. Most of the groundwater sampling at PFAS sites under RRD's lead is conducted by contractors familiar with PFAS sampling techniques. The RRD also has a Geologic Services Unit, with staff who install monitoring wells and are also well versed with PFAS sampling techniques. The MDEQ has been conducting environmental clean-up of regulated contaminants for decades. Due to the evolving nature of PFAS regulations as new science becomes available, the RRD is evaluating the need for regular PFAS sampling at Superfund sites and is including an evaluation of PFAS sampling needs as part of a Baseline Environmental Assessment review. Earlier in 2018, the RRD purchased lab equipment that will allow the MDEQ Environmental Lab to conduct analyses of certain PFAS samples. (Currently, most samples are shipped to one of the few labs in the country that conduct PFAS analysis, in California, although private labs in other parts of the country, including Michigan, are starting to offer these services.) As of August 2018, RRD has hired additional staff to work on developing the methodology and conducting PFAS analyses. In 2020 Michigan Attorney General Dana Nessel filed a lawsuit against 17 companies, including 3M, Chemours, and DuPont, for hiding known health and environmental risks from the state and its residents. Nessel's complaint identifies 37 sites with known contamination. The Michigan Department of Environment, Great Lakes, and Energy introduced some of the strictest drinking water standards in the country for PFAS, setting maximum contaminant levels (MCLs) for PFOA and PFOS to 8 and 16 ppt respectively (down from previous existing groundwater cleanup standards of 70 ppt for both), and introducing MCLs for five other previously unregulated PFAS compounds, limiting PFNA to six ppt, PFHxA to 400,000 ppt, PFHxS to 51 ppt, PFBS to 420 ppt and HFPO-DA to 370 ppt. The change adds 38 additional sites to the state's list of known PFAS contaminated areas, bringing the total number of known sites to 137. About half of these sites are landfills and 13 are former plating facilities. In 2022 PFOS was found in beef produced at a Michigan farm: the cattle had been fed crops fertilized with contaminated biosolids. State agencies issued a consumption advisory, but did not order a recall, because there currently is no PFOS contamination in beef government standards. A 2024 study found that "atmospheric deposition could be a significant environmental pathway, particularly for the Great Lakes."

In February 2018, 3M settled a lawsuit for $850 million related to contaminated drinking water in Minnesota. In January 2024, Minnesota banned PFAS in food packaging. In January 2025, Minnesota became the first state to ban 11 categories of products that PFAS, including carpets or rugs, cleaning products, cookware, cosmetics, dental floss, fabric treatments, juvenile products, menstruation products, textile furnishings, ski wax, and upholstered furniture.

In 2018 the New Jersey Department of Environmental Protection (NJDEP) published a drinking water standard for PFNA. Public water systems in New Jersey are required to meet an MCL standard of 13 ppt. In 2020 the state set a PFOA standard at 14 ppt and a PFOS standard at 13 ppt. In 2019 NJDEP filed lawsuits against the owners of two plants that had manufactured PFAS, and two plants that were cited for water pollution from other chemicals. The companies cited are DuPont, Chemours, and 3M. NJDEP also declared five companies to be financially responsible for statewide remediation of the chemicals. Among the companies accused were Arkema and Solvay regarding a West Deptford Facility in Gloucester County, where Arkema manufactured PFAS, but Solvay claims to have never manufactured but only handled PFAS. The companies denied liability and contested the directive. In June 2020, the EPA and NJDEP published a paper reporting that a unique family of PFAS used by Solvay, chloroperfluoropolyether carboxylates (ClPFPECAs), were contaminating the soils of New Jersey as far from the Solvay facility as 150 km. and the ClPFPECAs were found in water as well. Later in 2020, the New Jersey state attorney general filed suit in the New Jersey Superior Court against Solvay regarding PFAS contamination of the state's environment. In May 2021, Solvay issued a press release that the company is "discontinuing the use of fluorosurfactants in the U.S.". In August 2025, DuPont agreed to a 2 billion dollars settlement to clean up New Jersey industrial sites that were contaminated with PFAS.

In 2016, New York, along with Vermont and New Hampshire, acknowledged PFOA contamination by requesting the EPA to release water quality guidance measures. Contamination has been observed by the New York State Department of Environmental Conservation in Hoosick Falls, Newburgh, Petersburgh, Poestenkill, Mahopac, and Armonk. After a class action lawsuit, in 2021, the village of Hoosick Falls received a $65.25 million settlement from Saint-Gobain Performance Plastics, Honeywell, 3M, and DuPont due to the disposal of PFAS chemicals into the groundwater of the local water treatment plant.

Five military installations in Washington State have been identified by EPA and the United States Senate Committee on Environment and Public Works as having PFAS contamination. Toward environmental and consumer protections, the Washington State Department of Ecology published a Chemical Action Plan in November 2021, and in June 2022 the governor tasked the Washington State Department of Ecology with phasing out manufacture and import of products containing PFAS. Initial steps taken by the Washington State Department of Health to protect the public from exposure through drinking water have included setting State Action Levels for five PFAS (PFOA, PFOS, PFNA, PFHxS, and PFBS), which were implemented in November 2021.

== United Nations ==
In 2009, PFOS, its salts, and perfluorooctanesulfonyl fluoride, as well as PFOA and PFHxS, including their salts and precursors, were listed as persistent organic pollutants under the Stockholm Convention on Persistent Organic Pollutants due to their ubiquitous, persistent, bioaccumulative, and toxic nature. The convention has been ratified by 186 jurisdictions, but has most notably not been ratified by the United States, Israel, and Malaysia. The long-chain (C_{9}–C_{21}) PFCAs are currently under review for listing.
