= Perfluorooctanesulfonyl fluoride =

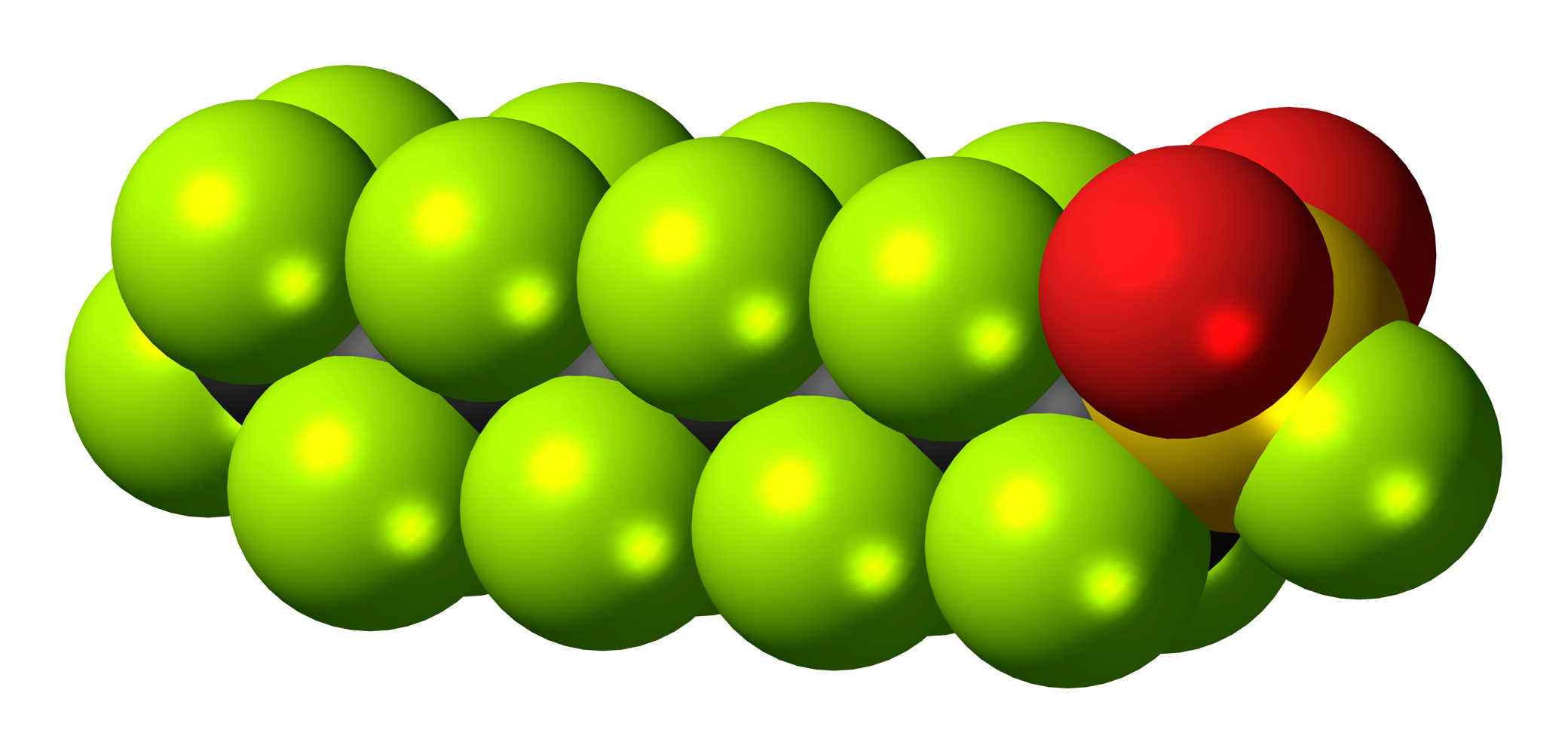

Names
- Preferred IUPAC name 1,1,2,2,3,3,4,4,5,5,6,6,7,7,8,8,8-Heptadecafluorooctane-1-sulfonyl fluoride

Identifiers
CAS Number	307-35-7
3D model (JSmol)	Interactive image
Abbreviations	POSF, PFOSF
ChemSpider	9019
ECHA InfoCard	100.005.638
EC Number	206-200-6
PubChem CID	9388
UNII	KPV81L86O0
CompTox Dashboard (EPA)	DTXSID5027140
- InChI: InChI=1S/C8F18O2S/c9-1(10,3(13,14)5(17,18)7(21,22)23)2(11,12)4(15,16)6(19,20)8(24,25)29(26,27)28 Key: BHFJBHMTEDLICO-UHFFFAOYSA-N; InChI=1/C8F18O2S/c9-1(10,3(13,14)5(17,18)7(21,22)23)2(11,12)4(15,16)6(19,20)8(24,25)29(26,27)28 Key: BHFJBHMTEDLICO-UHFFFAOYAY
- SMILES: C(C(C(C(C(F)(F)S(=O)(=O)F)(F)F)(F)F)(F)F)(C(C(C(F)(F)F)(F)F)(F)F)(F)F

Properties
Chemical formula	C_{8}F_{18}O_{2}S
Molar mass	502.12 g/mol
Boiling point	154 °C (309 °F; 427 K)

Related compounds
Related compounds	Perfluorooctanesulfonic acid (PFOS), Perfluorooctanesulfonamide (PFOSA), Perfluorooctanoic acid (PFOA), Perfluorobutanesulfonic acid (PFBS)
- Except where otherwise noted, data are given for materials in their standard state (at 25 °C [77 °F], 100 kPa). verify (what is ?) Infobox references

Perfluorooctanesulfonyl fluoride (POSF) is a synthetic perfluorinated compound with a sulfonyl fluoride functional group. It is used to make perfluorooctanesulfonic acid (PFOS) and PFOS-based compounds. These compounds have a variety of industrial and consumer uses, but POSF-derived substances ultimately degrade to form PFOS.

Because of environmental concerns over PFOS, 3M ceased POSF use in 2002 and global production plummeted. However, Chinese production grew after 3M's phaseout. As of May 2009, POSF and PFOS are listed as persistent organic pollutants (POPs) included in Annex B of the Stockholm Convention.

== Synthesis ==
POSF is synthesized by electrochemical fluorination of octanesulfonyl fluoride in anhydrous hydrogen fluoride by the equation:

C_{8}H_{17}SO_{2}F + 17 F^{−} → C_{8}F_{17}SO_{2}F + 17 H^{+} + 34 e^{−}.

This reaction results in a 25% yield for POSF, less than that for shorter perfluorosulfonyl fluorides. The POSF obtained is impure as it is a mixture of linear and branched isomers, with ~70% linear. POSF can also be obtained by ECF of the sulfonyl halide octanesulfonyl chloride.

== Production ==
In 1949, 3M began producing POSF by electrochemical fluorination (ECF). From 1966 to the 1990s, 3M production increased to meet demand for POSF-based compounds. In 1999, 3M reported POSF was its most highly produced fluorochemical. Before 2000, 3M was the largest global producer of POSF (mainly at their Decatur, AL and Antwerp facilities) and global production peaked at ~4500 tonnes per year.

In 1999, the U.S. Environmental Protection Agency began investigating perfluorinated compounds after receiving data on the global distribution and toxicity of PFOS, the key ingredient in Scotchgard. For these reasons, and USEPA pressure, the primary American producer of PFOS, 3M, announced, in May 2000, the phaseout of the production of PFOS, PFOA, and PFOS-related products. 3M stated that they would have made the same decision regardless of USEPA pressure.

Immediately after the 2000–2002 3M phaseout, production plummeted, but dominant and growing production shifted to China. In 2004 Chinese production of PFOS-based compounds was estimated to be <50 tonnes. In 2005 global production was estimated to be between 73 and 162 tonnes, and by 2006 Chinese production was estimated at >200 tonnes. Total historical global production was estimated at ~120,000 tonnes in 2009.

Most, if not all industrially synthesized perfluorooctanesulfonyl derivatives, such as PFOS, have POSF as their precursor.

== Reactivity ==
POSF and POSF-based polymers degrade to form PFOS which is not known to degrade by any environmental processes. POSF hydrolysis in water, however, occurs slowly.

POSF reacts with bases such as potassium hydroxide to form PFOS salts:

C_{8}F_{17}SO_{2}F + KOH → C_{8}F_{17}O_{2}SO_{3}^{−}K^{+} + HF.

Upon treatment with sulfuric acid the sulfonic acid PFOS tetrahydrate is obtained.

POSF also reacts with ammonia to form perfluorooctanesulfonamide:

C_{8}F_{17}SO_{2}F + NH_{3} → C_{8}F_{17}O_{2}SNH_{2}.

Sulfonamides and sulfonamidoethanols synthesized from POSF can in turn react to form a variety of different functional groups for different applications and products.

== Uses ==
Because of multiple carbon–fluorine bonds, POSF-derivatives have chemical properties that are hydrophobic ("water-afraid"), lipophobic ("fat-afraid"), and surface tension lowering (as fluorosurfactants). The main uses of chemical substances derived from POSF were:

- as stain and soil repellents for carpet;
- as water repellents for clothing;
- as fat and oil repellents in food packaging;
- as specialty applications such as semiconductor manufacturing and hydraulic fluids for airplanes; and
- in aqueous film forming foam (fire fighting foam) as fluorosurfactants.

Until 2019, the Stockholm Convention listed a variety of acceptable purposes and specific exemptions for POSF derivatives including

- photo-imaging;
- photo-resist and anti-reflective coatings for semiconductors;
- etching agent for compound semiconductors and ceramic filters;
- aviation hydraulic fluids;
- metal plating (hard metal plating) only in closed-loop systems;
- certain medical devices (such as ethylene tetrafluoroethylene copolymer (ETFE) layers and radio-opaque ETFE production, in-vitro diagnostic medical devices, and CCD colour filters);
- fire fighting foam;
- insect baits for control of leaf-cutting ants from Atta spp. and Acromyrmex spp.;
- photo masks in the semiconductor and liquid crystal display (LCD) industries;
- metal plating (hard metal plating);
- metal plating (decorative plating);
- electric and electronic parts for some colour printers and colour copy machines;
- insecticides for control of red imported fire ants and termites;
- chemically driven oil production;
- carpets;
- leather and apparel;
- textiles and upholstery;
- paper and packaging;
- coatings and coating additives; and
- rubber and plastics.

== International status ==
At the Fourth Conference of Parties, decision SC-4/17 put POSF, along with PFOS, in the Stockholm Convention on Persistent Organic Pollutants (Annex B) in May 2009. As such, POSF is not "banned" but has approved uses and exemptions—along with a program (SC-4/19) in Annex B that encourages reduced production.

== Environmental concern ==
The POSF degradation product, PFOS, is the dominant perfluorinated compound detected in biomonitoring studies, where concentrations that have been detected are considered sufficient to "alter health parameters".

== See also ==
- Organofluorine compounds
