= Perfluorooctanesulfonamide =

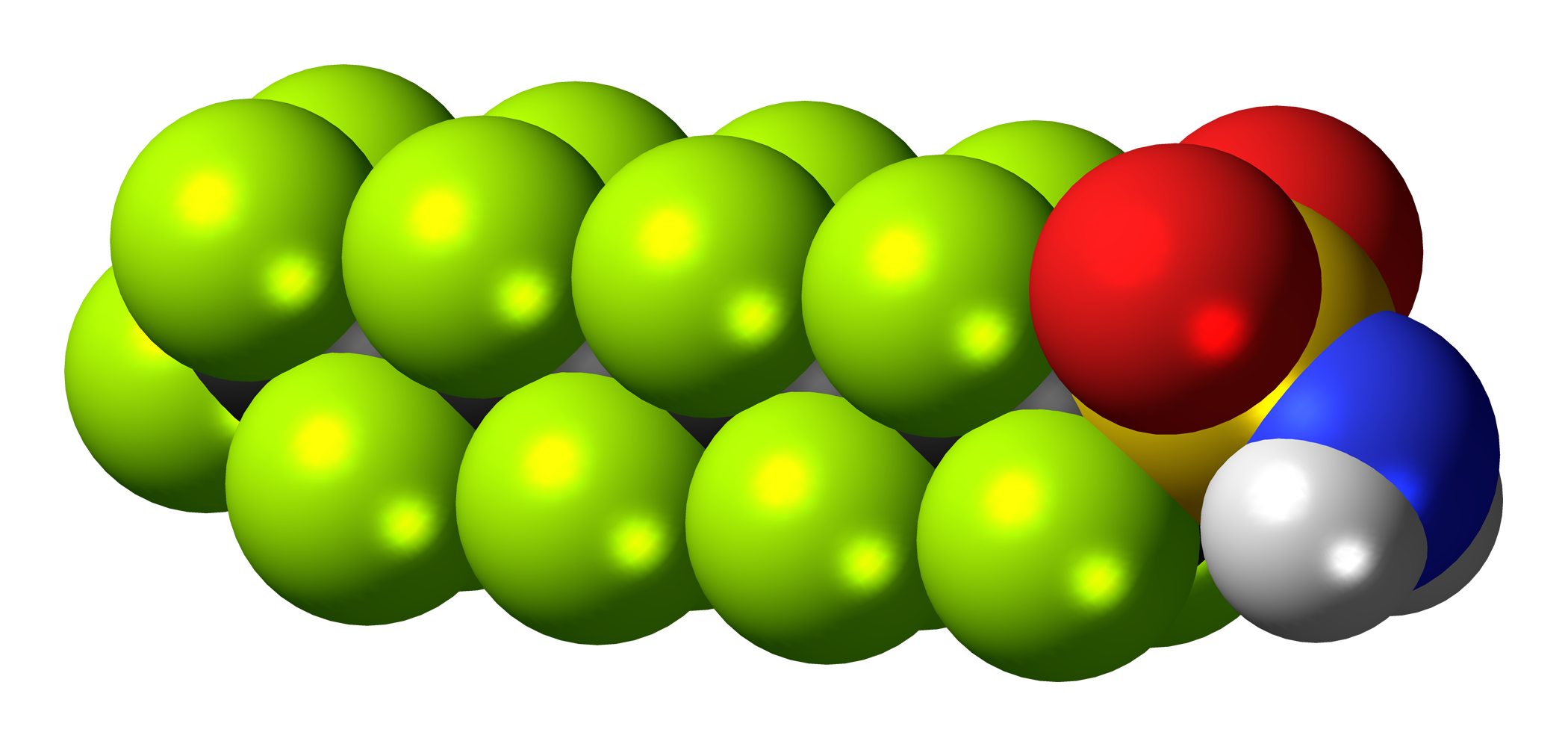

Names
- Preferred IUPAC name 1,1,2,2,3,3,4,4,5,5,6,6,7,7,8,8,8-Heptadecafluorooctane-1-sulfonamide
- Other names Perfluoroctylsulfonamide, Perfluorooctane sulfonamide, Heptadecafluorooctanesulphonamide, Perfluorooctanesulfonic acid amide, Deethylsulfluramid, FC-99

Identifiers
CAS Number	754-91-6
3D model (JSmol)	Interactive image
Abbreviations	FOSA, DESFA, PFOSA
ChEBI	CHEBI:138089
ChEMBL	ChEMBL1087375
ChemSpider	62984
ECHA InfoCard	100.010.951
EC Number	212-046-0
PubChem CID	69785
UNII	80AM718FML
CompTox Dashboard (EPA)	DTXSID3038939
- InChI: InChI=1S/C8H2F17NO2S/c9-1(10,3(13,14)5(17,18)7(21,22)23)2(11,12)4(15,16)6(19,20)8(24,25)29(26,27)28/h(H2,26,27,28) Key: RRRXPPIDPYTNJG-UHFFFAOYSA-N; InChI=1/C8H2F17NO2S/c9-1(10,3(13,14)5(17,18)7(21,22)23)2(11,12)4(15,16)6(19,20)8(24,25)29(26,27)28/h(H2,26,27,28); InChI=1/C8H2F17NO2S/c9-1(10,3(13,14)5(17,18)7(21,22)23)2(11,12)4(15,16)6(19,20)8(24,25)29(26,27)28/h(H2,26,27,28) Key: RRRXPPIDPYTNJG-UHFFFAOYAM
- SMILES: FC(F)(C(F)(F)S(=O)(=O)N)C(F)(F)C(F)(F)C(F)(F)C(F)(F)C(F)(F)C(F)(F)F

Properties
Chemical formula	C_{8}H_{2}F_{17}NO_{2}S
Molar mass	499.14 g/mol

Related compounds
Related compounds	Perfluorooctanesulfonic acid (PFOS), Perfluorobutanesulfonic acid (PFBS), Perfluorooctanoic acid (PFOA), Perfluorononanoic acid (PFNA)
- Except where otherwise noted, data are given for materials in their standard state (at 25 °C [77 °F], 100 kPa). verify (what is ?) Infobox references

Perfluorooctanesulfonamide (PFOSA) is a synthetic organofluorine compound. It is a fluorocarbon derivative and a perfluorinated compound, having an eight-carbon chain and a terminal sulfonamide functional group. PFOSA, a persistent organic pollutant, was an ingredient in 3M's former Scotchgard formulation from 1956 until 2003, and the compound was used to repel grease and water in food packaging along with other consumer applications. It breaks down to form perfluorooctane sulfonate (PFOS). PFOSA can be synthesized via the nucleophilic substitution of POSF with liquid ammonia or by a two step reaction via an azide followed by reduction with Zn and HCl. PFOSA is also a metabolic by-product of N-alkylated perfluorooctanesulfonamides. For example, N-ethyl perfluorooctanesulfonamidoethanol (N-EtFOSE), which was primarily used on paper, and N-methyl perfluorooctanesulfonamidoethanol (N-MeFOSE), which was primarily used on carpets and textiles, both metabolize via acetates to PFOSA.

In addition, PFOSA is thought to be the biologically active form of the insecticide Sulfluramid (N-ethyl perfluorooctanesulfonamide) as it is an extremely potent uncoupler of oxidative phosphorylation with an IC_{50} of about 1 micromolar (≈500 nanograms per milliliter or parts per billion). PFOSA was the most toxic perfluorinated compound in a study with PC12 cells. Concentrations ranged from 10 to 250 micromolar in the study (or 5000 to 125,000 parts per billion).

Wildlife biomonitoring studies have found the highest level of PFOSA in the liver of common dolphin (Mediterranean Sea, Italy) with a concentration of 878 parts per billion; the liver of mink from Illinois, US, contained 590 parts per billion. In fish, the highest levels detected were in the liver of Norway Pike (91 parts per billion) and homogenates of slimy sculpin (150 parts per billion) from Lake Ontario. Differences in biotransformation across species could explain some of its presence. In humans, PFOSA has been detected in sub- to low-parts per billion levels; for example, in 1999–2000 US serum samples, the 95th percentile (or value where only 5% of the population was higher) was 1.4 parts per billion while in 2003–2004 the 95th percentile fell to 0.2 parts per billion. However, whole-blood concentrations are about five times higher than those in blood plasma or serum.

== See also ==
- Fluorosurfactant
- Ionophore
