= Perfluoropropanesulfonic acid =

Names
- IUPAC name 1,1,2,2,3,3,3-heptafluoropropane-1-sulfonic acid
- Other names perfluoropropanesulfonic acid PFPrS

Identifiers
CAS Number	423-41-6
3D model (JSmol)	Interactive image
ChemSpider	8035470
EC Number	206-793-1
PubChem CID	9859771
UNII	1FV02N6NVO
CompTox Dashboard (EPA)	DTXSID30870531
- InChI: InChI=1S/C3HF7O3S/c4-1(5,2(6,7)8)3(9,10)14(11,12)13/h(H,11,12,13) Key: XBWQFDNGNOOMDZ-UHFFFAOYSA-N
- SMILES: C(C(F)(F)F)(C(F)(F)S(=O)(=O)O)(F)F

Properties
Chemical formula	C_{3}HF_{7}O_{3}S
Molar mass	250.09 g/mol

Hazards
- GHS labelling
Pictograms	(GHS05: Corrosive) (GHS07: Exclamation mark)
Signal word	Danger
Hazard statements	H302, H314
Precautionary statements	P280, P305+P351+P338, P310
- Except where otherwise noted, data are given for materials in their standard state (at 25 °C [77 °F], 100 kPa). verify (what is ?) Infobox references

Perfluoropropanesulfonic acid (PFPrS) is a PFAS chemical compound having a three-carbon fluorocarbon chain and a sulfonic acid functional group. It has been used within the manufacturing process of aqueous film forming foam (AFFF).

== See also ==
- FBSA
- Per- and polyfluoroalkyl substances
- PFNA
- PFOA
- Timeline of events related to per- and polyfluoroalkyl substances
