= Perfluorobutane sulfonamide =

Names
- Preferred IUPAC name 1,1,2,2,3,3,4,4,4-Nonafluorobutane-1-sulfonamide
- Other names Perfluorobutylsulfonamide, FBSA

Identifiers
| CAS Number | 30334-69-1 |
| 3D model (JSmol) | Interactive image |
| ChemSpider | 9133422 |
| ECHA InfoCard | 100.250.644 |
| PubChem CID | 10958205 |
| UNII | G4V6K37HVR |
| CompTox Dashboard (EPA) | DTXSID30880251 |
- InChI: InChI=1S/C4H2F9NO2S/c5-1(6,3(9,10)11)2(7,8)4(12,13)17(14,15)16/h(H2,14,15,16) Key: FUVKFLJWBHVMHX-UHFFFAOYSA-N
- SMILES: C(C(C(F)(F)S(=O)(=O)N)(F)F)(C(F)(F)F)(F)F

Properties
| Chemical formula | C_{4}H_{2}F_{9}NO_{2}S |
| Molar mass | 299.111 g/mol |

Hazards
- GHS labelling
| Pictograms | (GHS07: Exclamation mark) |
| Signal word | Warning |
| Hazard statements | H302, H312, H315, H319, H332, H335 |
| Precautionary statements | P261, P264, P270, P271, P280, P301+P312, P302+P352, P304+P312, P304+P340, P305+P351+P338, P312, P321, P322, P330, P332+P313, P337+P313, P362, P363, P403+P233, P405, P501 |
- Except where otherwise noted, data are given for materials in their standard state (at 25 °C [77 °F], 100 kPa). Infobox references

Perfluorobutane sulfonamide, also known as FBSA or H-FBSA, is a perfluorinated surfactant. FBSA and its N-alkylated derivatives have been patented by 3M for use in acid etch solutions with low surface tension. According to the inventors, FBSA and derivatives are expected to biomagnify less than the older surfactant PFOS. Nevertheless, a 2015 study found FBSA in 32 out of 33 samples of Canadian fish.

== Spills and releases ==
In April 2019, 3M admitted in a letter to the EPA that the plant in Decatur, Alabama released FBSA and FBSEE into the Tennessee River, despite a 2009 EPA order prohibiting release to water. Supposedly, authorities had been aware of the contamination since 2014, but did not make it public. The same facility has been responsible for releases and spills of other per- and polyfluorinated alkylated substances, namely PFOS and PFOA, into the Tennessee River, prompting 3M to pay $35 million to a local water authority in order to improve drinking water purification.

VTM Nieuws/Het Laatste Nieuws reported that 3M was illegally discharging the substance into the Scheldt river. This was being investigated by the Flemish authorities. On August 24, 2021, the company confessed to the allegations.

== See also ==
- PFBS (Perfluorobutanesulfonic acid)
