= Sulfluramid =

Names
- IUPAC name N-ethyl-1,1,2,2,3,3,4,4,5,5,6,6,7,7,8,8,8-heptadecafluorooctane-1-sulfonamide
- Other names N-Ethylperfluorooctylsulfonamide; N-Ethylheptadecafluorooctanesulfonamide

Identifiers
CAS Number	4151-50-2
3D model (JSmol)	Interactive image
ChEBI	CHEBI:81945
ChEMBL	ChEMBL177726
ChemSpider	70194
ECHA InfoCard	100.021.801
EC Number	223-980-3
KEGG	C18766
PubChem CID	77797
UNII	IPX089YR0A
CompTox Dashboard (EPA)	DTXSID1032646
- InChI: InChI=1S/C10H6F17NO2S/c1-2-28-31(29,30)10(26,27)8(21,22)6(17,18)4(13,14)3(11,12)5(15,16)7(19,20)9(23,24)25/h28H,2H2,1H3 Key: CCEKAJIANROZEO-UHFFFAOYSA-N
- SMILES: CCNS(=O)(=O)C(C(C(C(C(C(C(C(F)(F)F)(F)F)(F)F)(F)F)(F)F)(F)F)(F)F)(F)F

Properties
Chemical formula	C_{10}H_{6}F_{17}NO_{2}S
Molar mass	527.20 g·mol^{−1}
- Except where otherwise noted, data are given for materials in their standard state (at 25 °C [77 °F], 100 kPa). Infobox references

Sulfluramid (N-EtFOSA) is a chemical compound from the group of sulfonic acid amides and per- and polyfluoroalkyl substances (PFASs) that is effective as an insecticide. It acts as a prodrug to the mitochondrial uncoupler (IRAC group 13) perfluorooctanesulfonamide.

Annual production increased from about 30 tons in 2003 to 60 tons in 2013.

== Environmental issues ==
It is predominantly metabolized to perfluorooctanesulfonic acid (PFOS), but partly also to perfluorooctanoic acid (PFOA). Sulfluramid has been banned for almost all insecticidal applications; the only use still allowed by annex B of the Stockholm Convention on Persistent Organic Pollutants is a bait to control leaf-cutting ants.

Metabolism of sulfluramid.
