= Perfluorodecanesulfonic acid =

Names
- Preferred IUPAC name 1,1,2,2,3,3,4,4,5,5,6,6,7,7,8,8,9,9,10,10,10-Henicosafluoro-1-decanesulfonic acid
- Other names Henicosafluorodecanesulfonic acid, PFDS

Identifiers
CAS Number	335-77-3
3D model (JSmol)	Interactive image
ChemSpider	60955
ECHA InfoCard	100.005.820
EC Number	206-401-9
PubChem CID	67636
UNII	HAI638LYMV
CompTox Dashboard (EPA)	DTXSID3040148
- InChI: InChI=1S/C10HF21O3S/c11-1(12,3(15,16)5(19,20)7(23,24)9(27,28)29)2(13,14)4(17,18)6(21,22)8(25,26)10(30,31)35(32,33)34/h(H,32,33,34) Key: HYWZIAVPBSTISZ-UHFFFAOYSA-N
- SMILES: C(C(C(C(C(C(F)(F)S(=O)(=O)O)(F)F)(F)F)(F)F)(F)F)(C(C(C(C(F)(F)F)(F)F)(F)F)(F)F)(F)F

Properties
Chemical formula	C_{10}HF_{21}O_{3}S
Molar mass	600.14 g·mol^{−1}
Appearance	black solid
Density	1.8 g/cm^{3}
Boiling point	224–255 °C (435–491 °F; 497–528 K)

Hazards
- GHS labelling
Pictograms	(GHS05: Corrosive) (GHS08: Health hazard)
Signal word	Warning
- Except where otherwise noted, data are given for materials in their standard state (at 25 °C [77 °F], 100 kPa). Infobox references

Perfluorodecanesulfonic acid is a chemical compound from the group of perfluorosulfonic acids within the per- and polyfluorinated alkyl compounds (PFAS). The chemical formula is C_{10}F_{21}SO_{3}H. Perfluorodecanesulfonic acid is a persistent organic pollutant, known for its strong resistance to degradation.

== Occurrence ==
Perfluorodecanesulfonic acid is a micropollutant found in marine organisms and sewage sludge.

== Physical properties ==
Perfluorodecanesulfonic acid forms a dark brown to black solid.

== Use ==
Perfluorodecanesulfonic acid, as a very strong acid, can be used as a catalyst for regioselective alkylations and organic synthesis.
