= 6:2-Fluorotelomersulfonic acid =

Names
- Other names 6:2 Fluorotelomer Sulfonate

Identifiers
CAS Number	27619-97-2
3D model (JSmol)	Interactive image
ChemSpider	106865
ECHA InfoCard	100.044.149
EC Number	248-580-6
PubChem CID	119688
UNII	9E5JL7S7WY
CompTox Dashboard (EPA)	DTXSID6067331
- InChI: InChI=1S/C8H5F13O3S/c9-3(10,1-2-25(22,23)24)4(11,12)5(13,14)6(15,16)7(17,18)8(19,20)21/h1-2H2,(H,22,23,24) Key: VIONGDJUYAYOPU-UHFFFAOYSA-N
- SMILES: OS(=O)(=O)CCC(F)(F)C(F)(F)C(F)(F)C(F)(F)C(F)(F)C(F)(F)F

Properties
Chemical formula	C_{8}H_{5}F_{13}O_{3}S
Molar mass	428.16 g·mol^{−1}
Appearance	White to light brown solid
Density	1.68 g/cm³ (at 20 °C)
Melting point	69.1 °C (156.4 °F; 342.2 K)
Boiling point	238 °C (460 °F; 511 K)
Solubility in water	8.55×10^{−4} mol/L in water (20 °C)
Acidity (pK_{a})	1.31

Hazards
- GHS labelling
Pictograms	(GHS05: Corrosive) (GHS07: Exclamation mark) (GHS08: Health hazard)
Signal word	Danger
Hazard statements	H302, H314, H373
Precautionary statements	P260, P264, P264+P265, P270, P280, P301+P317, P301+P330+P331, P302+P361+P354, P304+P340, P305+P354+P338, P316, P317, P319, P321, P330, P363, P405, P501
- Except where otherwise noted, data are given for materials in their standard state (at 25 °C [77 °F], 100 kPa). Infobox references

6:2-fluorotelomersulfonic acid (6:2-FTS) is a chemical compound that belongs to the group of fluorotelomersulfonic acids within the broader class of per- and polyfluorinated alkyl compounds (PFAS). Due to its structural similarity to perfluorooctanesulfonic acid (PFOS), it is also called H_{4}PFOS.

== Production ==
6:2-Fluorotelomersulfonic acid is produced via telomerization. In addition, it is also formed, for example, from some perfluorocarboxybetaines after their splitting.

== Usage ==
6:2-Fluorotelomersulfonic acid and its derivatives are used as a replacement product for perfluorooctanesulfonic acid (PFOS) or its salts in fire-fighting foams. 6:2-FTS has also been used in the chromium plating industry to reduce mist formation during plating.
