= Perfluoro(4-ethylcyclohexane)sulfonic acid =

Names
- IUPAC name 1,2,2,3,3,4,5,5,6,6-decafluoro-4-(pentafluoroethyl)cyclohexane-1-sulfonic acid
- Other names: Perfluoro(perfluoroethyl)cyclohexanesulfonic acid; PFEtCHxS; PFECHS

Identifiers
CAS Number	646-83-3
3D model (JSmol)	Interactive image
ChemSpider	91843
PubChem CID	101650
CompTox Dashboard (EPA)	DTXSID70275965
- InChI: InChI=1S/C8HF15O3S/c9-1(4(14,15)8(21,22)23)2(10,11)5(16,17)7(20,27(24,25)26)6(18,19)3(1,12)13/h(H,24,25,26) Key: ICKAEAFPESRWOT-UHFFFAOYSA-N
- SMILES: C1(C(C(C(C(C1(F)F)(F)F)(F)S(=O)(=O)O)(F)F)(F)F)(C(C(F)(F)F)(F)F)F

Properties
Chemical formula	C_{8}HF_{15}O_{3}S
Molar mass	462.13 g·mol^{−1}
- Except where otherwise noted, data are given for materials in their standard state (at 25 °C [77 °F], 100 kPa). Infobox references

Perfluoro(4-ethylcyclohexane)sulfonic acid (PFEtCHxS) is a synthetic perfluorinated alkyl substance that has been used as a surfactant and in various industrial applications.

== Chemical properties ==
PFEtCHxS is a colorless liquid at room temperature and has a high surface tension, making it suitable for use as a surfactant.

The molecule contains two chiral centers.

== Applications ==
PFEtCHxS has been employed in various industrial processes, including:

- Metal plating and finishing operations
- Semiconductor manufacturing
- Photolithography processes

Its surfactant properties and resistance to extreme conditions make it useful in these applications.

== Environmental concerns ==
Like other perfluorinated compounds, PFEtCHxS is highly persistent in the environment and has been detected in various environmental matrices, including water, soil and biota. There are concerns about its potential bioaccumulation and adverse effects on human health and ecosystems.
