= Perfluorooctanesulfonic acid =

Fluorosurfactant and persistent organic pollutant

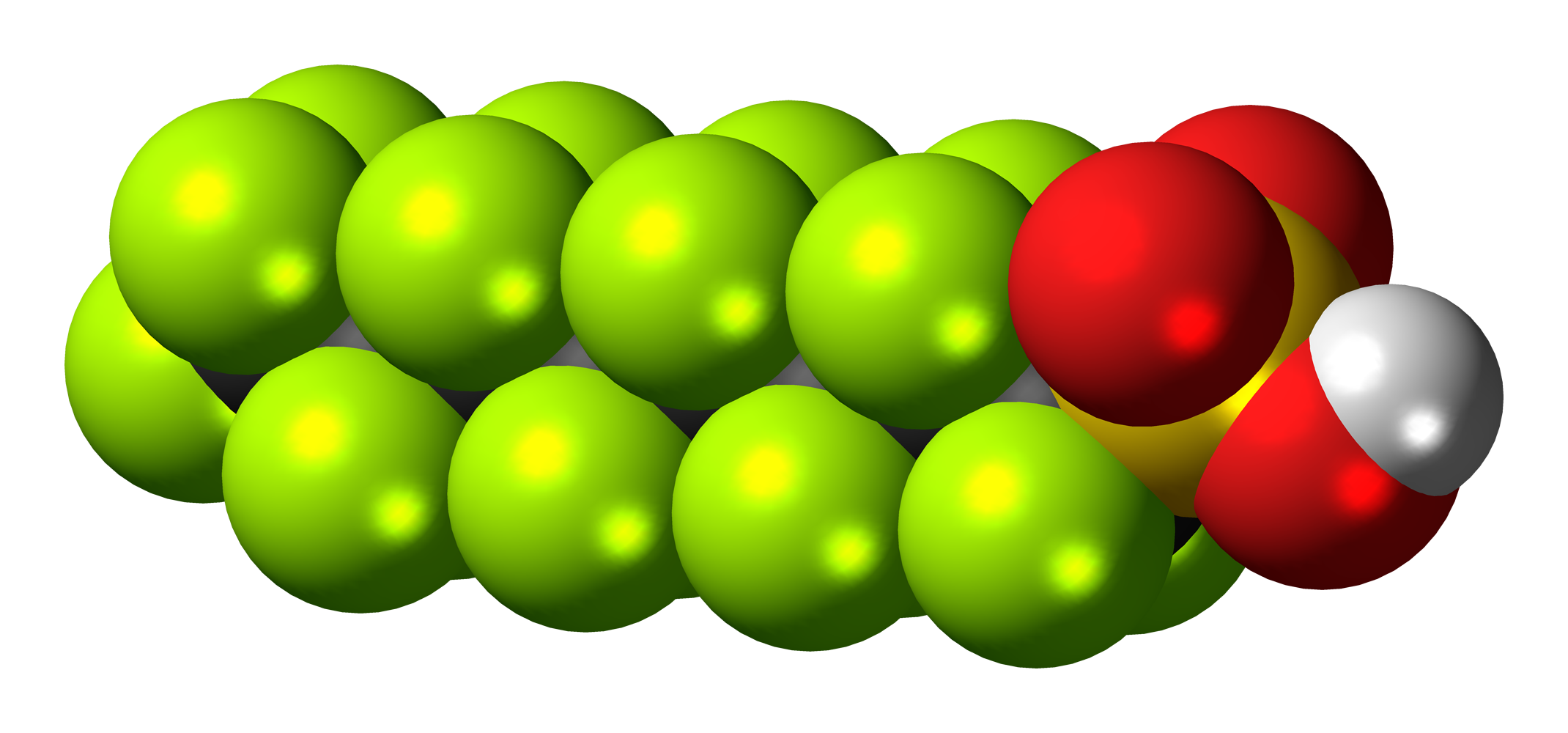

Names
- Preferred IUPAC name 1,1,2,2,3,3,4,4,5,5,6,6,7,7,8,8,8-Heptadecafluorooctane-1-sulfonic acid
- Other names PFOS

Identifiers
| CAS Number | 1763-23-1 |
| 3D model (JSmol) | Interactive image |
| ChEBI | CHEBI:39421 |
| ChEMBL | ChEMBL1876554 |
| ChemSpider | 67068 |
| ECHA InfoCard | 100.015.618 |
| EC Number | 217-179-8 |
| Gmelin Reference | 580137 |
| KEGG | C18142 |
| PubChem CID | 74483 |
| UNII | 9H2MAI21CL |
| CompTox Dashboard (EPA) | DTXSID3031864 |
- InChI: InChI=1S/C8HF17O3S/c9-1(10,3(13,14)5(17,18)7(21,22)23)2(11,12)4(15,16)6(19,20)8(24,25)29(26,27)28/h(H,26,27,28) Key: YFSUTJLHUFNCNZ-UHFFFAOYSA-N; InChI=1/C8HF17O3S/c9-1(10,3(13,14)5(17,18)7(21,22)23)2(11,12)4(15,16)6(19,20)8(24,25)29(26,27)28/h(H,26,27,28) Key: YFSUTJLHUFNCNZ-UHFFFAOYAS
- SMILES: FC(F)(C(F)(F)S(=O)(=O)O)C(F)(F)C(F)(F)C(F)(F)C(F)(F)C(F)(F)C(F)(F)F

Properties
| Chemical formula | C_{8}HF_{17}O_{3}S |
| Molar mass | 500.13 g/mol |
| Boiling point | 133 °C (271 °F; 406 K) at 6 torr |
| Acidity (pK_{a}) | <<0 |

Hazards
- Occupational safety and health (OHS/OSH)
| Main hazards | Toxic, persistent environmental pollutant |
- GHS labelling
| Pictograms | (GHS06: Toxic) (GHS08: Health hazard) (GHS09: Environmental hazard) |
| Signal word | Danger |
| NFPA 704 (fire diamond) | 3 0 0 |

Pharmacology
| Legal status | US: Illegal in California and Maine; Restricted internationally under Stockholm Convention |

Related compounds
| Related compounds | Perfluorooctanoic acid (PFOA), Perfluorobutanesulfonic acid (PFBS), Perfluorooctanesulfonamide (PFOSA), Perfluorononanoic acid (PFNA), 6:2-Fluorotelomersulfonic acid |
- Except where otherwise noted, data are given for materials in their standard state (at 25 °C [77 °F], 100 kPa). verify (what is ?) Infobox references

Perfluorooctanesulfonic acid and its conjugate base perfluorooctanesulfonate) are chemicals having an eight-carbon fluorocarbon chain and a sulfonic acid or sulfonate functional group. Collectively, the two species are called PFOS. The acid is an example of perfluorosulfonic acid. The acid and the sulfonate salts are perfluoroalkyl substances (PFAS). Once a poplular fluorosurfactant, PFOS is now regarded as a global pollutant. PFOS was the key ingredient in Scotchgard, a fabric protector made by 3M, and related stain repellents. The acronym "PFOS" refers to the parent sulfonic acid and to various salts of perfluorooctanesulfonate. These are all colorless or white, water-soluble solids. Although of low acute toxicity, PFOS has attracted much attention for its pervasiveness and environmental impact. It was added to Annex B of the Stockholm Convention on Persistent Organic Pollutants in May 2009.

== History ==
In 1949, 3M began producing PFOS-based compounds by electrochemical fluorination. In 1968, organofluorine compounds were detected in the blood serum of consumers, and in 1976, perfluorooctanoic acid (PFOA) or a related compound such as PFOS were suggested as components. In 1997, 3M detected PFOS in blood from global blood banks, although the company's internal documents indicate knowledge of this decades earlier, dating from the 1970s. In 1999, the U.S. Environmental Protection Agency began investigating perfluorinated compounds after receiving data on the global distribution and toxicity of PFOS, the key ingredient in Scotchgard. For these reasons, and USEPA pressure, the primary American producer of PFOS, 3M, announced, in May 2000, the phaseout of the production of PFOS, PFOA, and PFOS-related products. Most other manufacturers (particularly, those in Europe) phased out the production of PFOS and perfluorooctanoic acid (PFOA) in 2000 and 2006, respectively. A shorter-chain PFOS, perfluorohexanesulfonic acid (PFHxS), was included in Annex A to the Stockholm Convention in 2022.

As of 2015, most of PFOS and PFOS-related chemicals are produced in China.

== Production ==
The main method used for the industrial scale production of PFOS is electrochemical fluorination (ECF). ECF is an electrolysis method whereby the precursor of octanesulfonyl fluoride is electrolyzed in a solution of hydrogen fluoride to give perfluorooctanesulfonyl fluoride. ECF produces 70% linear PFOS, 25% branched and 5% terminal; this is not a function of the production process but rather that the precursor also exhibits this isomer ratio.

Although 89 constitutional isomers of PFOS are possible, environmental samples usually consist of the linear isomer and 10 branched isomers.

Telomerisation involves constructing the PFOS molecule using short chain (often 2-carbon) precursors and adding a sulfonate group as a final step. This production process results in 100% linear PFOS. This production method, whilst cleaner and resulting in a much purer product than ECF, is not known to have been widely used except for the production of reagent grade PFOS and analytical standards.

=== Indirect routes ===
Perfluorooctylsulfonyl compounds degrade to PFOS. Examples include N-methyl perfluorooctane sulfonamidoethanol (N-MeFOSE), a carpet stain repellent, and N-ethyl perfluorooctane sulfonamidoethanol (N-EtFOSE), a paper treatment. Also perfluorooctanesulfonamide is a precursor. About 50 precursors were named in the 2004 proposed Canadian ban on PFOS.

== Chemical properties ==
Perfluorooctanesulfonic acid is a strong acid and as such does not exist in aqueous settings. Instead it is fully ionized. Regardless, the acid and its anion highly resist degradation under environmental conditions. Waste water treatment plants also fail to degrade PFOS.

The C_{8}F_{17} subunit of PFOS is hydrophobic and lipophobic, like other fluorocarbons, while the sulfonic acid/sulfonate group confers polarity. PFOS is an exceptionally stable compound in industrial applications and in the environment because of the aggregate effect of many carbon–fluorine bonds. PFOS is a fluorosurfactant that lowers the surface tension of water more than that of hydrocarbon surfactants.

== Uses ==
Perfluorooctanesulfonic acid was usually used as the sodium or potassium salts.

- PFOS was the key ingredient in Scotchgard, a fabric protector made by 3M, and numerous stain repellents.
- PFOS, together with PFOA, has also been used to make aqueous film forming foam (AFFF), a component of fire-fighting foams, and alcohol-type concentrate foams.
- PFOS compounds can also be found in some impregnation agents for textiles, paper, and leather; in wax, polishes, paints, varnishes, and cleaning products for general use; in metal surfaces, and carpets.
- In the semiconductor industry, PFOS is used in multiple photolithographic chemicals including: photoacid generators (PAGs) and anti-reflective coatings (ARCs). It has been phased out in the European Union semiconductor industry due to health concerns.
- PFOS is the key ingredient in Skydrol, a fire-resistant hydraulic fluid used in commercial aviation.

The most important emission sources of PFOS have been metal plating and fire-fighting foams. Because of concerns about PFOS, F-53B has been used as a replacement for mist suppression in metal plating.

== Levels in humans ==
Because of its chemical properties, PFOS will remain in the body for several years. It is estimated that it takes 4 years for half of this substance to be eliminated from the body.

PFOS is detected in the blood serum of almost all people in the U.S., but concentrations have been decreasing over time. In contrast, PFOS blood levels appear to be rising in China where PFOS production continues. A study of ca. 2000 teenagers from 9 European countries with most samples collected in years 2016-2018 found higher blood concentrations of several PFOS's in those, who consumed more seafood, eggs or offal, as well as in those from North and West (versus the South and East) Europe. Within the same country, boys had a higher PFOS concentrations than girls. A typical PFOS blood concentration range in this study was 1,500–2,500 ppb.

Much higher levels of blood PFOS (12,830 ppb) have been reported in people with occupational exposure —or possibly 1,656 parts per billion—in a consumer. Occupationally exposed individuals may have an average level of PFOS over 1000 parts per billion, and a small segment of individuals in the upper range of the general population may be over the 91.5 parts per billion level.

PFOS exposure has been demonstrated as early as fetal development during pregnancy since PFOS can easily pass through the placenta. It has been shown that fetal exposure to PFOS is quite prevalent and has been shown to be detected in greater than 99% of umbilical cord serum samples.

PFOS has been detected in U.S. freshwater fish, as well as in municipal wastewater and drinking water samples, worldwide, at concentrations ranging between few ng/L and some μg/L.

== Levels in wildlife ==
A variety of wildlife species have had PFOS levels measured in egg, liver, kidney, serum, and plasma samples and some of the highest recorded values as of January 2006 are listed below.

| Species | Geography | Year | Sample | PFOS (ppb) |
|---|---|---|---|---|
| Bald eagle | Midwestern United States | 1990–93 | plasma | 2,200 |
| Brandt's cormorant | California, US | 1997 | liver | 970 |
| Guillemot | Baltic Sea, Sweden | 1997 | egg | 614 |
| Carrion crow | Tokyo Bay, Japan | 2000 | liver | 464 |
| Red-throated loon | North Carolina, US | 1998 | liver | 861 |
| Polar bear | Sanikiluaq, Nunavut, Canada | 2002 | liver | 3,100 |
| Harbor seal | Wadden Sea, the Netherlands | 2002 | muscle | 2,725 |
| Bottlenose dolphin | Charleston, South Carolina, US | 2003 | plasma | 1,315 |
| Common dolphin | Mediterranean Sea, Italy | 1998 | liver | 940 |
| Mink | Michigan, US | 2000–01 | liver | 59,500 |
| Common shiner | Ontario, Canada | 2001 | liver | 72,900 |
| Great tit | near 3M, Port of Antwerp, Belgium | 2007 | liver | 553–11,359 |

Despite the global wide-ranging restriction, PFOS concentrations in air continued to increase at many monitoring stations between 2009 and 2017.

== Health effects in humans and wildlife ==
The effects of PFOS on humans and animals have been of much interest. The reproductive, developmental, liver, kidney, thyroid, and immunological effects have received scrutiny. According to a 2002 report by the Environmental Directorate of the OECD, "PFOS is persistent, bioaccumulative, and toxic to mammalian species."

=== Pregnancy outcomes ===
Several studies have focused on pregnancy outcomes in infants and mothers who are exposed to PFOS during pregnancy. For developing offspring, exposure to PFOS occurs through the placenta. While the impact of PFOS compounds on fetal development continues to be an ongoing investigation, findings have demonstrated a relationship between PFOS exposure in pregnant mothers and negative birth outcomes.

There has been some evidence to suggest that PFOS levels in pregnant women have been associated with preeclampsia, preterm labor, low birth weight and gestational diabetes. Although, the strongest association is between PFOS levels with preterm birth and preeclampsia. Although there has been some evidence to suggest that PFOS impairs fetal growth during pregnancy, although findings have been inconsistent, the specific physiological mechanisms behind adverse pregnancy outcomes with PFOS exposure remain unclear.

=== Breastfeeding and lactation ===
PFOS has been measured in breastmilk and is estimated to contribute the greatest level of PFOS exposure in infants. Specifically, the duration of breastfeeding has been shown to be associated with increases in PFOS in infants. Some evidence has shown that breastmilk accounts for more than 94% of the PFOS exposure in infants up to six months old. The Agency for Toxic Substances and Disease Registry (ATSDR) concluded that breastfeeding benefits continue to outweigh potential risks associated with PFOS in breastmilk.

=== Thyroid disease ===
Increased levels of PFOS have been shown to accumulate in thyroid gland cells and have been associated with altered thyroid hormone levels in adults. Appropriate levels of thyroid hormone during pregnancy are critical for a developing fetus as this hormone is involved with brain development and body growth. Studies have demonstrated a relationship between PFOS exposure and thyroid dysfunction during pregnancy, resulting in altered thyroid hormone levels in both the mother and the fetus.

=== Blood lipid levels ===
Although chronic PFOS exposure was associated with small increases in total cholesterol and low-density lipoprotein levels in adults, there is insufficient evidence to determine whether PFOS increases the risk of cardiovascular diseases.

=== Kidney diseases ===
PFOS exposure is associated with kidney failure, chronic kidney diseases, and increased risk of kidney cancer. The mechanisms of how PFOS affects kidney health remain poorly understood, as of 2024.

=== Cancer ===
As of 2023, the International Agency for Research on Cancer classified PFOS as possibly carcinogenic to humans (Group 2b) based on "strong" mechanistic evidence, a position also adopted by the US National Cancer Institute.

=== In wildlife ===
The levels observed in wild animals are considered sufficient to "alter health parameters".

PFOS affects the immune system of male mice at a blood serum concentration of 91.5 parts per billion, raising the possibility that highly exposed people and wildlife are immunocompromised. Chicken eggs dosed at 1 milligram per kilogram (or 1 part per million) of egg weight developed into juvenile chickens with an average of ~150 parts per billion in blood serum—and showed brain asymmetry and decreased immunoglobulin levels.

== Regulation ==
=== Globally ===
It was added to Annex B of the Stockholm Convention on Persistent Organic Pollutants in May 2009. Originally, parties agreed on acceptable purposes (time-unlimited exemptions) for the following uses—in addition to a range of specific exemptions (time-limited):

- Photo-imaging
- Photo-resist and anti-reflective coatings for semi-conductors
- Etching agent for compound semi-conductors and ceramic filters
- Aviation hydraulic fluids
- Metal plating (hard metal plating) only in closed-loop systems
- Certain medical devices such as ethylene tetrafluoroethylene (ETFE) copolymer layers and radio-opaque ETFE production, in vitro diagnostic medical devices, and CCD color filters
- Fire-fighting foam
- Insect baits for control of leaf-cutting ants from the genera Atta and Acromyrmex.

In 2019, it was decided to only keep one acceptable purpose:

- Insect baits with sulfluramid as an active ingredient for control of leaf-cutting ants from Atta spp. and Acromyrmex spp. for agricultural use only

=== Canada ===
In 2023, the Government of Canada is considering addressing PFAS as a class rather than as individual substances or in smaller groups. A report to conclude that PFAS as a class are harmful to human health and the environment, and to define risk management aspects and alternatives to PFAs, is under development.

=== Europe ===
Based on an OECD study on PFOS and a risk assessment by Europe's Scientific Committee on Health and Environmental Risks the European Union practically banned the use of PFOS in finished and semi-finished products in 2006 (maximum content of PFOS: 0.005% by weight). However, PFOS use for industrial applications (e.g. photolithography, mist suppressants for hard chromium plating, hydraulic fluids for aviation) was exempted. In 2009 this directive was incorporated into the REACH regulation. In the summer of 2010 PFOS was added to the regulation on persistent organic pollutants and the threshold was lowered to max. 0.001% by weight (10 mg/kg).

=== United States ===
In 2018 the State of Michigan established a legally enforceable groundwater cleanup level of 70 ppt for both PFOA and PFOS.

In 2020 the Michigan Department of Environment, Great Lakes, and Energy (EGLE) adopted stricter drinking water standards in the form of maximum contaminant levels (MCLs), lowering acceptable levels from the 2018 enforceable groundwater cleanup levels of 70 ppt to 8 ppt for PFOA and 16 ppt for PFOS and adding MCLs for 5 previously unregulated PFAS compounds PFNA, PFHxA, PFHxS, PFBS, and HFPO-DA.

In 2020, a California bill was passed banning PFOS and the following salts as an intentionally added ingredient from cosmetics: ammonium perfluorooctane sulfonate, diethanolamine perfluorooctane sulfonate, lithium perfluorooctane sulfonate and potassium perfluorooctane sulfonate.

In March 2021 the U.S. EPA announced that it will develop national drinking water standards for PFOA and PFOS.

In October 2021 the EPA proposed to designate PFOA and PFOS as hazardous substances in its PFAS Strategic Roadmap. In September 2022 the EPA proposed to designate as hazardous substances under the Superfund Comprehensive Environmental Response, Compensation, and Liability Act of 1980 (CERCLA).

== See also ==
- 2005 Hertfordshire Oil Storage Terminal fire
- Fluorocarbons
- Per- and polyfluoroalkyl substances
- Timeline of events related to per- and polyfluoroalkyl substances
