= Scotchgard =

Stain- and water-repellent fabric protectant

Scotchgard is a 3M brand of stain repellent and durable water repellent applied to fabrics, upholstery, and carpets to protect them from stains. Scotchgard products typically are based on organofluorine chemicals dissolved in a petroleum distillate solvent.

== History ==
In 1938 Roy J. Plunket, a recent hire at DuPont, discovered polytetrafluoroethylene (or Teflon)—a fluoropolymer that led to the invention of synthetic rubber. His early discovery led 3M scientists to develop the formula for Scotchgard, discovered by accident in 1953 when Joan Mullan—a 3M lab technician—spilled a few drops of a fluorochemical liquid destined for rubber jet fuel hoses onto her tennis shoes. Despite common cleaning methods, the coating resisted removal. 3M chemists, Patsy Sherman and Samuel Smith, continued work on the properties of fluorochemicals, culminating in products that could treat most fabrics with a stain resistant coating. They jointly hold 13 patents regarding fluorochemical polymers and polymerization processes, though Sherman is generally recognized as the scientist who discovered Scotchgard's possibilities.

Sales began in 1956, and in 1973 the two chemists received a patent for the formula.

C_{8} fluorinated urethane constituent that has later been replaced by a C_{4} alternative

3M reformulated Scotchgard and since June 2003 has replaced perfluorooctanesulfonic acid (PFOS) with perfluorobutanesulfonic acid (PFBS). PFBS has a much shorter half-life in people than PFOS (a little over one month vs. 5.4 years). 3M now states that Scotchgard utilizes a proprietary fluorinated urethane.

== Environmental concerns ==
During 1999, the United States Environmental Protection Agency (EPA) began an investigation into the class of chemicals used in Scotchgard, after receiving information on the global distribution and toxicity of perfluorooctane sulfonate (PFOS), the "key ingredient" of Scotchgard. The compound perfluorooctanesulfonamide (PFOSA), a PFOS precursor, was an ingredient and also has been described as the "key ingredient" of Scotchgard. Under US EPA pressure, in May 2000, 3M announced the phaseout of the production of PFOA, PFOS, and PFOS-related products. In May 2009, PFOS was determined to be a persistent organic pollutant (POP) by the Stockholm Convention. Following the EPA's investigation into 3M Contamination of Minnesota Groundwater, in 2018, 3M agreed to pay the state of Minnesota $850 million to settle a $5 billion lawsuit over drinking water contaminated by PFOA and other fluorosurfactants.

== See also ==
- Fluorocarbon
- Fluorosurfactant
