= Perfluorohexanesulfonic acid =

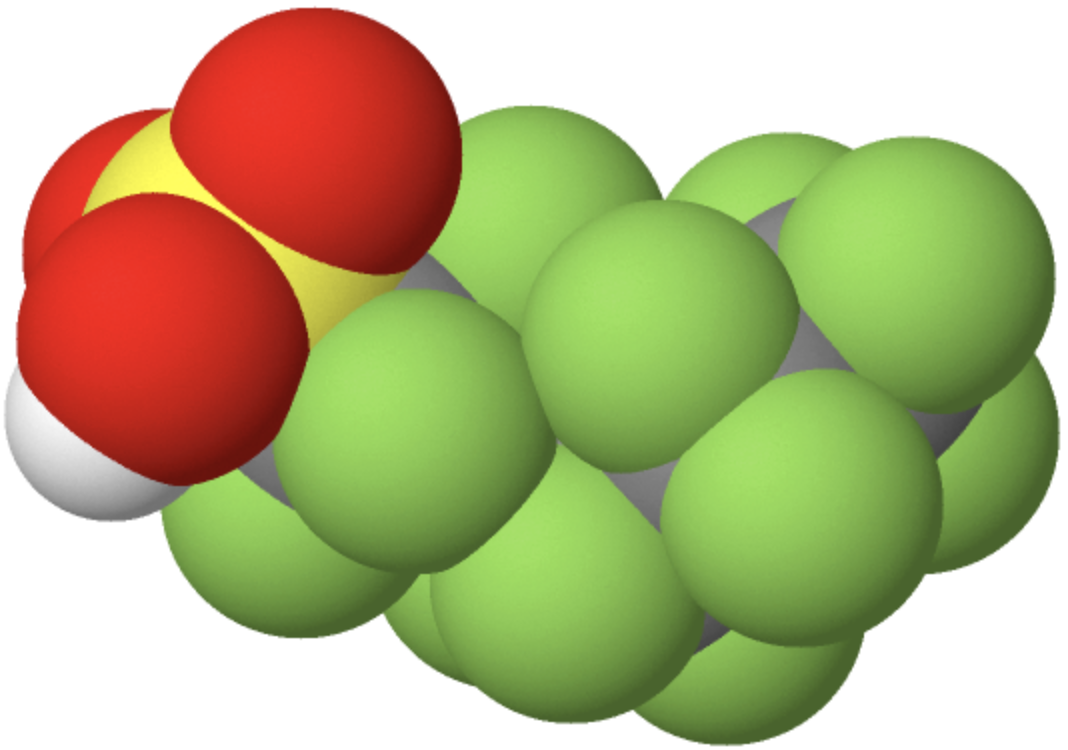

Names
- IUPAC name 1,1,2,2,3,3,4,4,5,5,6,6,6-tridecafluorohexane-1-sulfonic acid
- Other names: PFHxS; Perfluorohexane sulfonate; Perfluorohexane sulfonic acid; Perfluorohexane-1-sulfonic acid

Identifiers
CAS Number	355-46-4
3D model (JSmol)	Interactive image
ChEBI	CHEBI:132448
ChEMBL	ChEMBL1906987
ChemSpider	61053
ECHA InfoCard	100.005.989
EC Number	206-587-1
PubChem CID	67734
UNII	ZU6Y1E592S
CompTox Dashboard (EPA)	DTXSID7040150
- InChI: InChI=1S/C6HF13O3S/c7-1(8,3(11,12)5(15,16)17)2(9,10)4(13,14)6(18,19)23(20,21)22/h(H,20,21,22) Key: QZHDEAJFRJCDMF-UHFFFAOYSA-N
- SMILES: C(C(C(C(F)(F)S(=O)(=O)O)(F)F)(F)F)(C(C(F)(F)F)(F)F)(F)F

Properties
Chemical formula	C_{6}HF_{13}O_{3}S
Molar mass	400.11 g·mol^{−1}
Density	1.841 g·cm^{−3}
Solubility in water	6.2 mg/L (25 °C)
log P	3.7 (estimated)
Vapor pressure	0.0046 mmHg (estimated)
Acidity (pK_{a})	−3.45

Hazards
- GHS labelling
Pictograms	(GHS05: Corrosive) (GHS07: Exclamation mark)
Signal word	Danger
Hazard statements	H302, H312, H314, H332
Precautionary statements	P260, P264, P270, P271, P280, P301+P312, P301+P330+P331, P302+P352, P303+P361+P353, P304+P312, P304+P340, P305+P351+P338, P310, P312, P321, P322, P330, P363, P405, P501

Pharmacology
Legal status	US: Illegal in California and Maine; Restricted internationally under Stockholm Convention
- Except where otherwise noted, data are given for materials in their standard state (at 25 °C [77 °F], 100 kPa). Infobox references

Perfluorohexanesulfonic acid (PFHxS) (conjugate base perfluorohexanesulfonate) is a synthetic chemical compound. It is one of many compounds collectively known as per- and polyfluoroalkyl substances (PFASs). It is an anionic fluorosurfactant and a persistent organic pollutant with bioaccumulative properties. Although the use of products containing PFHxS and other PFASs have been banned or are being phased out in many jurisdictions, it remains ubiquitous in many environments and within the general population, and is one of the most commonly detected PFASs.

== Production ==
PFHxS, its salts and isomers are anthropogenic chemicals that do not occur naturally. It is used as a surfactant and protective coating in applications such as aqueous firefighting foams, textile coating, metal plating and in polishing agents. PFHxS production is slowly being phased out since 3M stopped producing C_{6} fluorotelomers in 2002, but production by other companies may be ongoing. Between 1958 and 2015, an estimated 120-1022 metric tonnes of PFHxS were produced. PFHxS was also used as replacement for PFOS after the Stockholm Convention on persistent organic pollutants restricted the use of PFOS. The exact quantity of PFHxS produced or in production is difficult to estimate, as production volumes and relevant formulation information is often not publicly available. PFHxS may also be formed as an impurity of PFOS production, or as a breakdown product of larger PFASs.

== Biochemical properties ==
PFHxS has a six carbon fluorocarbon chain that is both hydrophobic and lipophobic. Its sulfonic acid functional group imparts polarity, and allows it to interact with other polar compounds. Due to the strength of its carbon-fluorine bonds, it persists in the environment and in living organisms.

In humans, PFHxS binds to blood albumin, and relatively little PFHxS is found in the liver compared to longer chain PFASs such as PFOS. The half-life of PFHxS in adult blood serum is 5.3 years (4.7 years for women and 7.4 years for men). The half-life of PFASs in human blood generally decreases with decreasing backbone (CF_{2}) length. However, PFHxS is an unusual exception in that its half-life is greater than both longer and shorter chain equivalents such as PFOS or PFBS.

== Occurrence in Humans ==
Data from the 2003-2004 National Health and Nutrition Examination Survey in the United States found the average serum concentration of PFHxS in the general US population to be 1.9 μg/L, with the 10th and 90th percentiles being 0.7 and 8.3 μg/L, respectively. Some studies reported serum PFHxS concentrations in the United States to be gradually decreasing since at least 1999. Nevertheless, evidence of exposure can be detected amongst people with historic exposure. Serum concentrations of PFHxS were elevated amongst a cohort of Australian firefighters with occupational exposure to PFHxS (mean = 33 μg/L) compared to the general Australian population (mean = 3.2 μg/L), and were significantly correlated with serum PFOS concentrations. As with PFOS, serum PFHxS concentrations are lower amongst women and people who reported blood donation.

There is limited evidence for a relationship between PFHxS exposure and various health outcomes. However, contributions from PFHxS specifically are difficult to isolate, as most studies in humans and higher order organisms investigate exposure to a complex mixture of PFASs, of which PFHxS is just one component.

== Regulatory status ==
A number of jurisdictions have guidelines or limits for the concentration of PFHxS in water, in diets, and in the environment. There are fewer regulations on PFHxS compared to PFOS and PFOA. This reflects the relative lack of epidemiological and toxicological information on the human health effects of exposure to PFHxS.

PFHxS, its salts and related compounds have been recommended to be added to Annex A of the United Nations Stockholm Convention on Persistent Organic Pollutants. The decision was initially scheduled to be made in June 2021. Due to the COVID-19 pandemic, the decision at the conference of parties was deferred to June 2022, where the parties agreed to list PFHxS, its salts and related compounds in Annex a without specific exemptions. Upon entry into force, nations party to the convention are legally bound to take act to cease production and use of PFHxS. Several hundred salts and precursors of PFHxS fall within the scope of the restriction.

=== Australia ===
Food Standards Australia New Zealand found insufficient evidence to justify a tolerable daily intake (TDI) for PFHxS specifically. Therefore, the TDI level for PFOS (0.02 μg/kg) was adapted as the TDI for the sum of PFOS and PFHxS. Australia uses a drinking water guideline value of 0.07 μg/L for the sum of PFHxS and PFOS. In comparison, the drinking water guideline value for PFOA is 0.56 μg/L.

=== Europe ===
A new EU drinking water directive issued in 2020 adopted PFAS limit values. The limit values are 0.1 μg/L for the sum of 20 PFASs including PFHxS, and 0.5 μg/L for the sum of all PFASs. This directive is binding for all EU member nations. It is a minimum directive, and member states can elect to adopt stricter regulations.

==== Denmark ====
The Danish EPA has established a drinking water and groundwater limit value of 2 ng/L for the sum of 4 PFASs; PFHxS, PFOS, PFOA, and perfluorononanoic acid (PFNA).

==== Sweden ====
The Swedish National Food Agency recommends a drinking water limit of 0.09 μg/L for the sum of 11 PFASs (PFBS, PFHxS, PFOS, 6:2 FTSA, PFBA, PFPeA, PFHxA, PFHpA, PFOA, PFNA and PFDA). If PFASs are found above this limit in drinking water, immediate action is recommended to reduce the PFAS concentration in the drinking water to as far below the action level as possible. If PFASs is found above 900 ng/L in drinking water, the advice is to avoid drinking the water or preparing food with the water until the concentration drops to below 90 ng/L, and to contact the Swedish Food Agency.

=== Republic of Korea ===
In 2018, a preliminary drinking water limit value of 0.48 μg/L was adopted for PFHxS. In comparison, the preliminary limit value for the sum of PFOS and PFOA is 0.07 μg/L.

=== United States ===
As of 2019, there is no federal limit or guideline value for PFHxS. The United States Environmental Protection Agency (EPA) is developing toxicity values for PFHxS, as well as PFBA, PFHxA, PFNA and PFDA. Meanwhile, some states have adopted their own guideline values for PFHxS. For example, Minnesota recommends a guidance value of 0.027 μg/L for PFHxS, and Michigan has a screening level of 0.084 μg/L for PFHxS.

In 2020, Michigan adopted drinking water standards for 5 previously unregulated PFASs including PFHxS, setting a maximum contaminant level (MCL) of 51 parts per trillion (ppt) or 0.051 μg/L.

== See also ==
- Perfluorooctanesulfonic acid
- Per- and polyfluoroalkyl substances
- Timeline of events related to per- and polyfluoroalkyl substances
