= Perfluorobutanesulfonic acid =

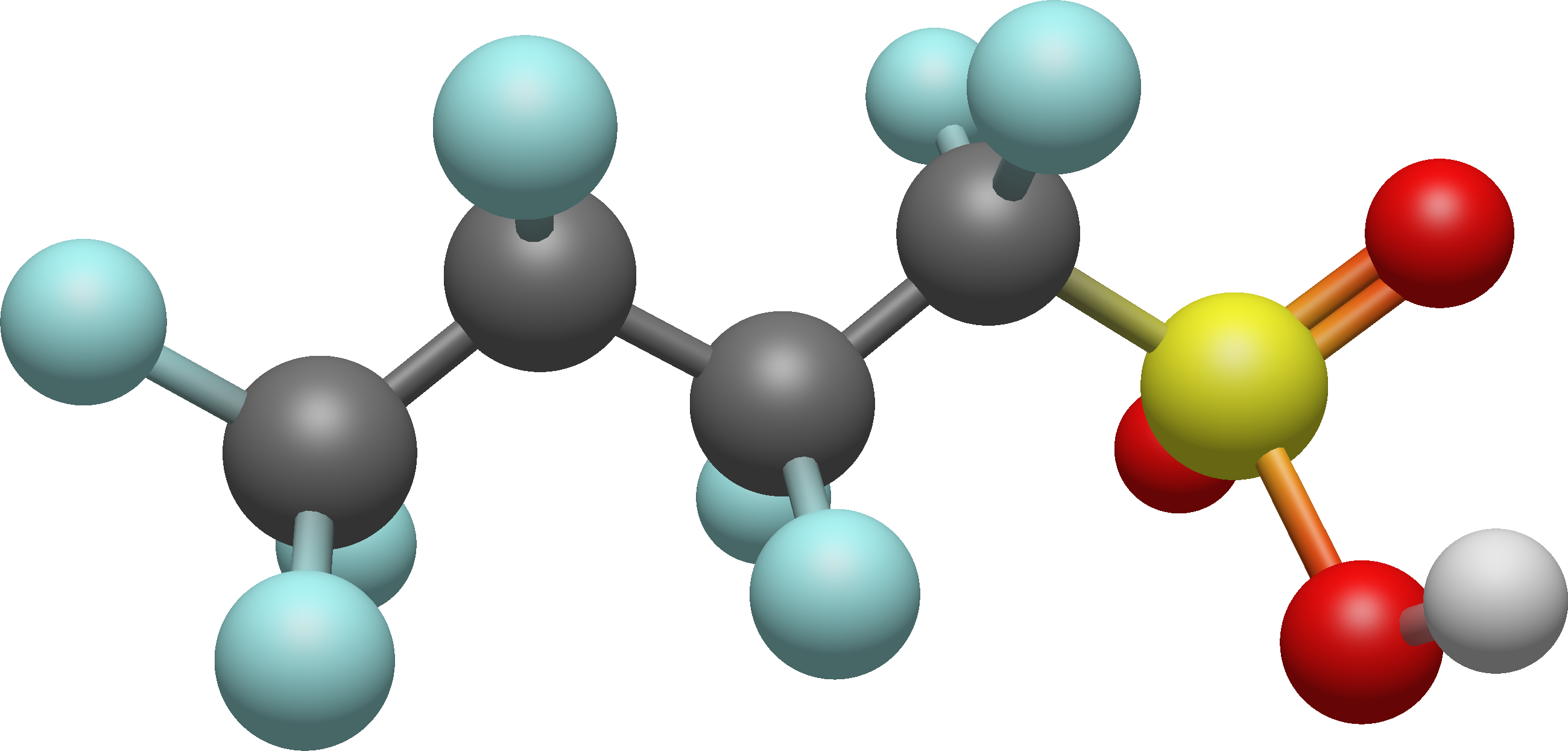

Names
- Preferred IUPAC name 1,1,2,2,3,3,4,4,4-Nonafluorobutane-1-sulfonic acid
- Other names FC-98 Nonaflate; Nonafluorobutanesulphonic acid Perfluorobutane sulfonate PFBS

Identifiers
| CAS Number | 375-73-5 |
| 3D model (JSmol) | Interactive image |
| ChEBI | CHEBI:132446 |
| ChemSpider | 61132 |
| ECHA InfoCard | 100.006.176 |
| EC Number | 206-793-1 |
| PubChem CID | 67815 |
| RTECS number | EK5930000 |
| UNII | 1FV02N6NVO |
| UN number | 3094, 3265 |
| CompTox Dashboard (EPA) | DTXSID5030030 |
- InChI: InChI=1S/C4HF9O3S/c5-1(6,3(9,10)11)2(7,8)4(12,13)17(14,15)16/h(H,14,15,16) Key: JGTNAGYHADQMCM-UHFFFAOYSA-N; InChI=1S/C4HF9O3S/c5-1(6,3(9,10)11)2(7,8)4(12,13)17(14,15)16/h(H,14,15,16) Key: JGTNAGYHADQMCM-UHFFFAOYSA-N
- SMILES: OS(=O)(=O)C(F)(F)C(F)(F)C(F)(F)C(F)(F)F

Properties
| Chemical formula | C_{4}HF_{9}O_{3}S |
| Molar mass | 300.10 g/mol |
| Boiling point | 210–212 °C (410–414 °F; 483–485 K) |

Hazards
- GHS labelling
| Pictograms | (GHS05: Corrosive) (GHS07: Exclamation mark) |
| Signal word | Danger |
| Hazard statements | H302, H314 |
| Precautionary statements | P280, P305+P351+P338, P310 |
- Except where otherwise noted, data are given for materials in their standard state (at 25 °C [77 °F], 100 kPa). verify (what is ?) Infobox references

Perfluorobutanesulfonic acid (PFBS) is a PFAS chemical compound having a four-carbon fluorocarbon chain and a sulfonic acid functional group. It is stable and unreactive because of the strength of carbon–fluorine bonds. It can occur in the form of a colorless liquid or solid. Its conjugate base is perfluorobutanesulfonate (also called nonaflate) which functions as the hydrophobe in fluorosurfactants.

Since June 2003, 3M has used PFBS as a replacement for the persistent, toxic, and bioaccumulative compound perfluorooctanesulfonic acid (PFOS) in its Scotchgard stain repellents.

== Safety ==
PFBS has a half-life of a little over one month in humans, much shorter than PFOS with 5.4 years. PFBS is thought to be persistent in the environment. Studies have not yet been specifically conducted to determine safety in humans.

The European Chemicals Agency decision adding PFBS to the REACH Regulation Candidate List of Substances of Very High Concern states:

"The combined intrinsic properties justifying the inclusion as a substance for which there is scientific evidence of probable serious effects to human health and the environment which give rise to an equivalent level of concern are the following: very high persistence, high mobility in water and soil, high potential for long-range transport, and difficulty of remediation and water purification as well as moderate bioaccumulation in humans. The observed probable serious effects for human health and the environment are thyroid hormonal disturbances and reproductive toxicity seen in rodents, and effects on liver, kidney and haematological system in rats, hormonal disturbances and effects on reproduction in marine medaka fish and effects on expression of hormone receptors in tadpoles. Together, these elements lead to a very high potential for irreversible effects."

== Legislation and regulation ==
=== Canada ===
British Columbia currently provides soil standards for perfluorobutane sulfonate (PFBS). In November 2017, the BC Ministry of Environment and Climate Change Strategy released soil and water standards for three PFAS including PFBS to the British Columbia Contaminated Sites Regulation.

=== European Union ===
In January 2020, PFBS and its salts were added to the REACH Regulation Candidate List of Substances of Very High Concern (SVHCs) on the grounds of "Equivalent level of concern having probable serious effects to human health (Article 57(f) – human health)" and "Equivalent level of concern having probable serious effects to the environment (Article 57(f) – environment)".

=== United States ===
In April 2024, the EPA announced the final National Primary Drinking Water Regulations (NPDWR) for six PFAS compounds, specifying a maximum contaminant level (MCL) of 2000 parts per trillion (ppt) for PFBS and a "hazard index" limit on mixtures of PFBS, PFHxS, PFNA and HFPO-DA.

A few states have proposed or implemented regulations on PFBS in drinking watering either as contamination standards, guidance or health advisories. In 2020, Michigan adopted drinking water standards for 5 previously unregulated PFAS compounds, including PFBS which has a maximum contaminant level (MCL) of 420 parts per trillion (ppt).

== See also ==
- FBSA
- Perfluorinated alkylated substances (PFAS)
- PFOA
- PFNA
- Timeline of events related to per- and polyfluoroalkyl substances (PFAS)
