= Perfluorodecanoic acid =

Names
- Preferred IUPAC name Nonadecafluorodecanoic acid
- Other names PFDA; C_{10} PFCA

Identifiers
CAS Number	335-76-2
3D model (JSmol)	Interactive image
ChEBI	CHEBI:35546
ChEMBL	ChEMBL1885037
ChemSpider	9181
ECHA InfoCard	100.005.819
EC Number	206-400-3
Gmelin Reference	35659
PubChem CID	9555
UNII	W5XW2B8Q9E
UN number	2811 (PERFLUORODECANOIC ACID)
CompTox Dashboard (EPA)	DTXSID3031860
- InChI: InChI=1S/C10HF19O2/c11-2(12,1(30)31)3(13,14)4(15,16)5(17,18)6(19,20)7(21,22)8(23,24)9(25,26)10(27,28)29/h(H,30,31) Key: PCIUEQPBYFRTEM-UHFFFAOYSA-N
- SMILES: C(=O)(C(C(C(C(C(C(C(C(C(F)(F)F)(F)F)(F)F)(F)F)(F)F)(F)F)(F)F)(F)F)(F)F)O

Properties
Chemical formula	C_{10}HF_{19}O_{2}
Molar mass	514.086 g·mol^{−1}
Melting point	77–81 °C (171–178 °F; 350–354 K)
Boiling point	218 °C (424 °F; 491 K)
- Except where otherwise noted, data are given for materials in their standard state (at 25 °C [77 °F], 100 kPa). Infobox references

Perfluorodecanoic acid (PFDA) is a fluorosurfactant and has been used in industry.

PFDA is a member of the group of polyfluoroalkyl substances (PFAS), more specific is it also a perfluoroalkyl acid (PFAA). PFAS, like PFDA, are man-made and are not naturally occurring in nature. Over the last decades they have been used in consumer products and industrial applications. It is a fluorosurfactant with a unique hydrophobicity and oleophobicity. PFDA is well resistant to heat, oil, stains, grease and water, therefore it has been used in stain and greaseproof coating for furniture, packaging and carpet. Next to that, PFDA has also been found in nano-and impregnation-sprays, outdoor textiles, gloves, ski wax, leather, cosmetics, medical equipment and paper-based food containers. PFDA has a relatively high toxicity and can promote tumor growth.

It was recently linked to health concerns, like other fluorosurfactants, leading to proposed restrictions on its use. In 2020, a California bill banned its use as an intentionally added ingredient in cosmetics.

It has been proposed as a chemical probe to study peroxisome proliferation.

== Structure and reactivity ==
Perfluorodecanoic acid is a compound with a carbon chain of 10. At 9 of the carbons the hydrogens are replaced by all fluorine atoms, the last carbon is the carboxylate group. The length of the PFDA carbon chain is greater than that of PFOAs (perfluorooctanoic acids) and PFOS (perfluorooctane sulfonic acid) indicating that it is possibly more toxic.

Perfluorodecanoic acid is a chemically inert due to relatively high organic bond strength and fluorine's electron negativity, which makes it resistant to advanced oxidation processes. It is also resistant to hydrolysis and has thermal and photochemical stability unless certain reaction conditions are introduced, e.g., PFDA can be decomposed in hot water in the presence of S_{2}O_{8}^{2-}. Photochemical decomposition with Na_{2}S is another way of breaking up PFDA molecules.

== Synthesis and reactions ==
The first main road of perfluorochemicals (to which PFDA belongs) is electrochemical fluorination (ECF). This reaction occurs during an electrochemical hydrolysis of hydrofluoric acid (anhydrous) at a cell potential of 4.5 to 7 V. Several compounds can be used as starting material, for example, carboxylic acids (RCOOH), acyl chlorides (RCOCl) or sulfonic acid chlorides (RSO_{2}Cl). The second step of the reaction is hydrolysis (addition of NaOH) to obtain the final products:

RCOOH + nHF → RFCOOH + nH_{2}O + by-products
RFCOOH + NaOH → RFCOONa + H_{2}O

RCOCl + nHF → RFCO + nHCl + by-products
RFCO + NaOH → RFCOONa + H_{2}O

RSO_{2}Cl + nHF → RFSO_{2}F + nHCl + by-products
RFSO_{2}F + 2NaOH → RFSO_{3}Na+ NaF+ H_{2}O

The second main synthesis road for perfluorodecanoic acid used commercially is telomerization. Since PFDA has an even number of carbons, the starting material should be pentafluoroethyl iodide. The process follows the general scheme:

              Telomerization
            Tetrafluoroethylene
                    ↓
           Perfluoroalkyl iodide
                    ↓
        Fluorotelomer alcohols (FTOH)
                    ↓
        Perfluorochemicals (e.g. PFDA)

== Biochemical effects ==
Via contaminated water or soil, plants can take up PFDA. This may lead to exposure and accumulation of PFDA in humans and other organisms. In addition, exposure is possible via inhalation of indoor and outdoor air and ingestion of drinking water and food. Direct dermal contact with PFDA-containing products is the main route of exposure.

PFDA has been shown to increase the expression of two cytochrome P450 enzymes, namely Cyp2B10 and 4A14 in mouse liver. In addition, it has been shown to activate the peroxisome proliferator-activated receptor alpha (PPARα). This receptor regulates lipid metabolism.

A study looked at the harmful effects of PFDA on the antioxidative defense system in erythrocytes (red blood cells). Their results indicated that PFDA could influence the contents and activity of the biomolecules: GSH, MDA, SOD, CAT and GPx. This can lead to lipid peroxidation and oxidative injury of erythrocytes. The carbon chain length plays an important role, exposure to PFDA resulted in more obvious alterations of these biomolecules than shorter carbon chains of PFAA's.

Further, has merging evidence showed that PFDA exposure can be associated with higher plasma triglyceride concentration in humans. It is however unknown how PFDA might affect adipogenesis. HepG2 cells and 3T3-L1 differentiation model were used to detect the effects and mechanism of PFDA on lipid metabolism. PFDA showed to promote cellular triglyceride accumulation and triglyceride content in a concentration dependent manner. It also activated the NLP3 inflammasome. The inflammasome is crucial for induction of lipogenic genes expression in fatty acid synthase (FAS), hydroxymethyl glutaryl coenzyme A synthase (HMGCS) and stearoyl-CoA desaturase 1 (SCD1). Besides, a suggestion can be made that PFDA may promote adipogenesis via an NLRP3 inflammasome-mediates SREBP1 pathway. Also, the expression of SREBP1, which is an important regulator of lipid metabolism, and its target genes were increased after PFDA treatment. The PFDA-induced SREBP1 enhanced expression can be terminated by caspase-1 inhibitor and by siNLRP3.

== Degradation ==
PFDA is resistant to hydrolysis, photolysis and biodegradation, this causes persistence of the compound in the environment. With its long carbon chain and carboxylate group, PFDA has some similar structure to amino acids. But it does not biodegrade according to the route of fatty acid metabolism.

== Human exposure ==
Studies have shown that there is a decreasing trend in the concentration of PFDA in Danish pregnant women from years of 2008–2013. Germany also follows this trend, while the concentration of this chemical is growing in Japan, Korea, Greenland, and Northern Norway. Under normal conditions, the amount of PFDA in European individuals was 0.8 ng/mL in 2013.

== Effects of exposure ==
Perfluorodecanoic Acid (PFDA) is not a medication and does not have any approved medical uses. It is widely used as an industrial chemical, and is persistent in the environment and can accumulate in the body. Numerous studies point to its negative health effects.

It has been detected in the blood of people and animals worldwide. The EPA has issued a lifetime health advisory for PFDA in drinking water of 70 parts per trillion (ppt).

Perfluorodecanoic acid (PFDA) is a chemical of significant concern due to its classification as a Persistent, Bioaccumulative, and Toxic (PBT) substance. It has been identified as a potential carcinogen, with an acute oral toxicity estimate indicating a lethal dose for 50% of rats at 57 mg/kg. The substance is known to cause a range of acute symptoms as side effects such as a burning sensation, coughing, wheezing, and difficulty in breathing, which require immediate medical attention.

=== Developmental ===
One longitudinal study had identified that PFDA was significantly higher in the cord serum of patients that later developed autism, and although the mechanism was unclear, it may involve effects of PFDA on the immune system or microbiome.

=== Animal studies ===
There is little research done on the influence of PFDA on humans, most studies are done on animals. The human Reference Dose of PFDA can be calculated from mouse studies. In order to do that the NOAEL (no observed adverse effect level) should be divided by 10000.

A study on rats has shown that the administration of PFDA can cause certain changes in the thyroid gland function. While the concentration of hormone triiodothyronine (T3) in blood remained the same, gland weight and levels of thyroxine have decreased. Interestingly, this has led to only an 8% reduction in the metabolic rate of these rats.

A single dose of 5mg/kg of PFDA is enough to cause these symptoms in rodents, as well as harm to the rough endoplasmic reticulum in the hepatic cells as well as abnormal mitochondria. Except for its effect on the liver and thyroid gland, one study on pigs has shown that this chemical may prevent fertilization by causing oocyte death.

Another study on fish has found that PFDA alters the production of sex hormones and thus leads to endocrine disturbance. This is done through increased levels of 17β-estradiol (E2) that lead to upregulation of the cyp19b and cyp19a gene. These genes are necessary for the production of aromatase and regulate the production of estrogen from androgen.

== Toxicity ==
Research has shown that PFDA inhibits peroxisomal β-oxidation, a crucial metabolic process for energy production from fatty acids and is associated with DNA damage. This damage comes in the form of double-strand breaks. It is also a potent and long-lasting toxin that may contribute to tumor formation. Studies have linked PFDA exposure to exacerbated adiposity and hepatic lipid accumulation, especially when combined with a high-fat diet, indicating a risk factor for liver problems.

One important antioxidant molecule in the liver that helps protect cells from damage caused by free radicals is glutathione (GSH). PFDA exposure increases the total amount of GSH in the liver. This impact suggests an attempt by the body to counteract oxidative stress caused by the chemical. Furthermore, exposure to PFDA has been associated with miscarriage, liver damage, inflammation, and various negative effects on the heart, thyroid, and reproductive systems. It disrupts hormonal and immune system functions and can cause cellular damage through the activation of the PPARα receptor, affecting liver function and triggering oxidative stress, and the NLRP3 inflammasome pathway in both human cells and mouse tissues.

PFDA interferes with the NF-κB pathway that induces the production of proinflammatory cytokines. In gastric cells, PFDA has been found to increase the production of pro-inflammatory molecules IL-1β and IL-18, suggesting a role in stomach inflammation. Essentially, NLRP3 acts like a switch that turns on the production of mature IL-1β and IL-18. The active IL-1β and IL-18 are then released from the cell. They travel to nearby cells and trigger an inflammatory response. It may also promote the proliferation of gastric epithelial cells, potentially preventing them from entering a state of senescence, which is a natural process to prevent uncontrolled cell growth. This increased growth could be a concern since uncontrolled cell growth is a hallmark of cancer.

The toxicokinetic profile of PFDA reveals a long half-life in the body (52-66 days in rats), regardless of sex. Yet, female rats showed higher levels of PFDA accumulation in their bloodstream than males after exposure. Their bodies also showed slower clearance rates. Similar to rats, PFDA in humans likely accumulates in the liver and triggers peroxisomal beta-oxidation. Data based on biomonitoring in Korea states that the margin of exposure of PFDA in human males was about two times higher than that of females (100.5, male; 27.7, female), indicating a lower risk for males.
