= Telomer =

Telomer may refer to:

- telomerization, in polymer science, which results in an extremely small polymer—one whose degree of polymerization is generally between 2 and 5
- an abbreviation for fluorotelomer
- telomere in genetics
