= Telomere (disambiguation) =

A telomere is a region of repetitive nucleotide sequences at each end of a chromosome.

Telomere may also refer to:

- Telomere (insect morphology), a type of genital clasper
- Telomere resolvase, an enzyme found in bacteria which contain linear plasmids.

== See also ==
- Telomerization
