= Perfluorohexanoic acid =

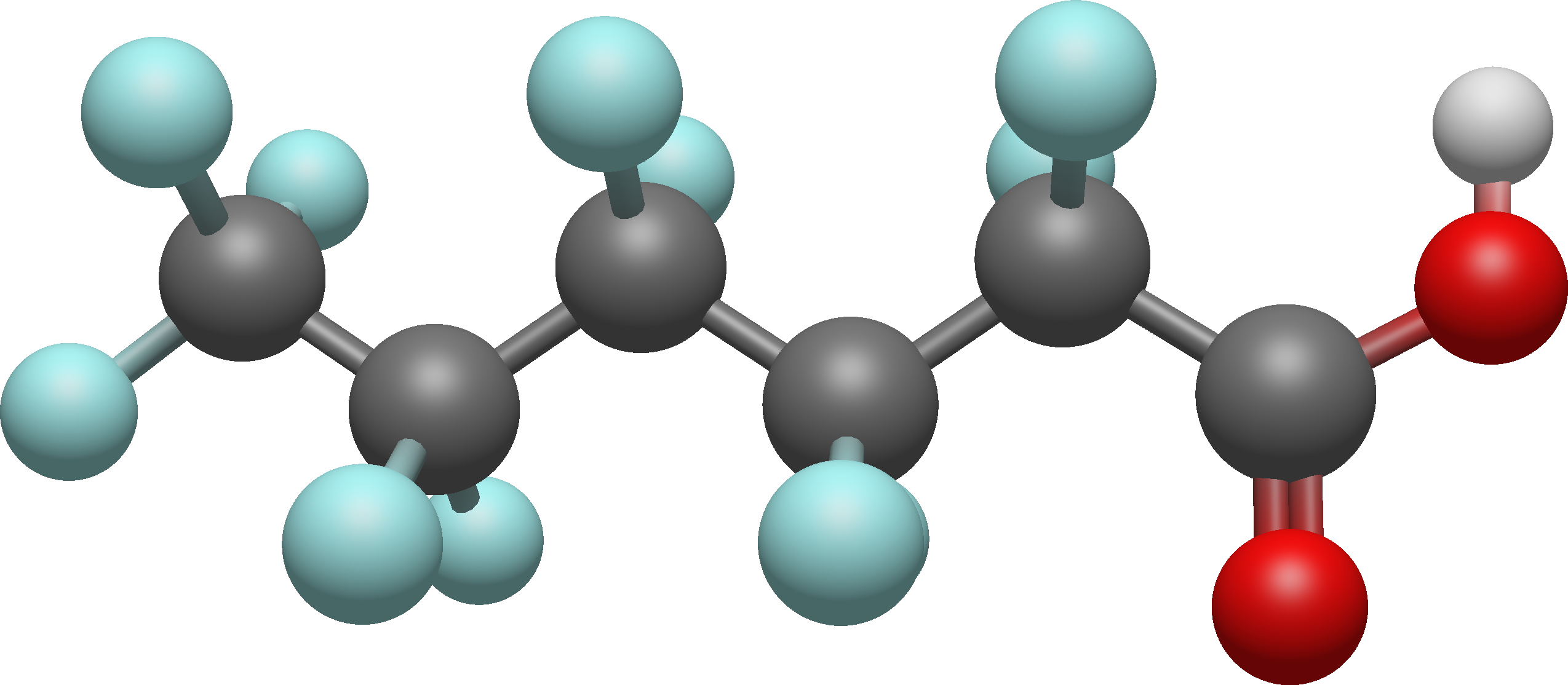

Names
- IUPAC name 2,2,3,3,4,4,5,5,6,6,6-undecafluorohexanoic acid
- Other names undecafluorohexanoic acid C_{6}

Identifiers
CAS Number	307-24-4
3D model (JSmol)	Interactive image
Abbreviations	PFHxA
ChEBI	CHEBI:83492
ChEMBL	ChEMBL3183213
ChemSpider	60864
ECHA InfoCard	100.005.634
EC Number	206-196-6
PubChem CID	67542
UNII	ZP34Q2220R
CompTox Dashboard (EPA)	DTXSID3031862
- InChI: InChI=1S/C6HF11O2/c7-2(8,1(18)19)3(9,10)4(11,12)5(13,14)6(15,16)17/h(H,18,19) Key: PXUULQAPEKKVAH-UHFFFAOYSA-N
- SMILES: C(=O)(C(C(C(C(C(F)(F)F)(F)F)(F)F)(F)F)(F)F)O

Properties
Chemical formula	C_{6}HF_{11}O_{2}
Molar mass	314.054 g·mol^{−1}
Appearance	Colorless liquid
Density	1.757 g/cm^{3}
Boiling point	157 °C (314.6 °F; 430 K)
log P	3.48
Vapor pressure	1.98 mm Hg
Atmospheric OH rate constant	5.2 10^{−13} cu cm/molec sec
Acidity (pK_{a})	−0.16

Hazards
- GHS labelling
Pictograms	(GHS05: Corrosive)
Signal word	Danger
Hazard statements	H314
Precautionary statements	P264, P280, P301+P330+P331, P303+P361+P353, P304+P340+P310, P305+P351+P338+P310, P363, P405, P501
- Lethal dose or concentration (LD, LC)
LD_{50} (median dose)	140 mg/L (B. calyciflorus over 24hrs)
- Safety data sheet (SDS)

Related compounds
Related compounds	Trifluoroacetic acid Perfluoropropanoic acid Perfluorobutanoic acid Perfluoropentanoic acid
- Except where otherwise noted, data are given for materials in their standard state (at 25 °C [77 °F], 100 kPa). Infobox references

Perfluorohexanoic acid (PFHxA) is a perfluorocarboxylic acid derivative of hexanoic acid. Side-chain fluorinated polymers and fluorotelomer compounds with five carbon atoms or more commonly degrade into perfluorohexanoic acid.

Perfluorohexanoic acid does not seem to persistently bioaccumulate in the manner of many other PFAS. For example, in a study sponsored by the Swedish EPA, Swedish ski wax technicians, who have high PFAS exposure, did not have significantly higher levels of PFHxA in their blood samples when compared to the general population median for their age groups, even while having concentrations of other PFAS, like PFOA, up to 44 times higher than the general population.

In 2020 Michigan adopted drinking water standards for five previously unregulated PFAS compounds including PFHxA which has a maximum contaminant level (MCL) of 400 parts per billion (ppb).

Its placing on the market and use will be restricted in the EEA and Switzerland by 2026.
