= Perfluorooctanoic acid =

Perfluorinated carboxylic acid

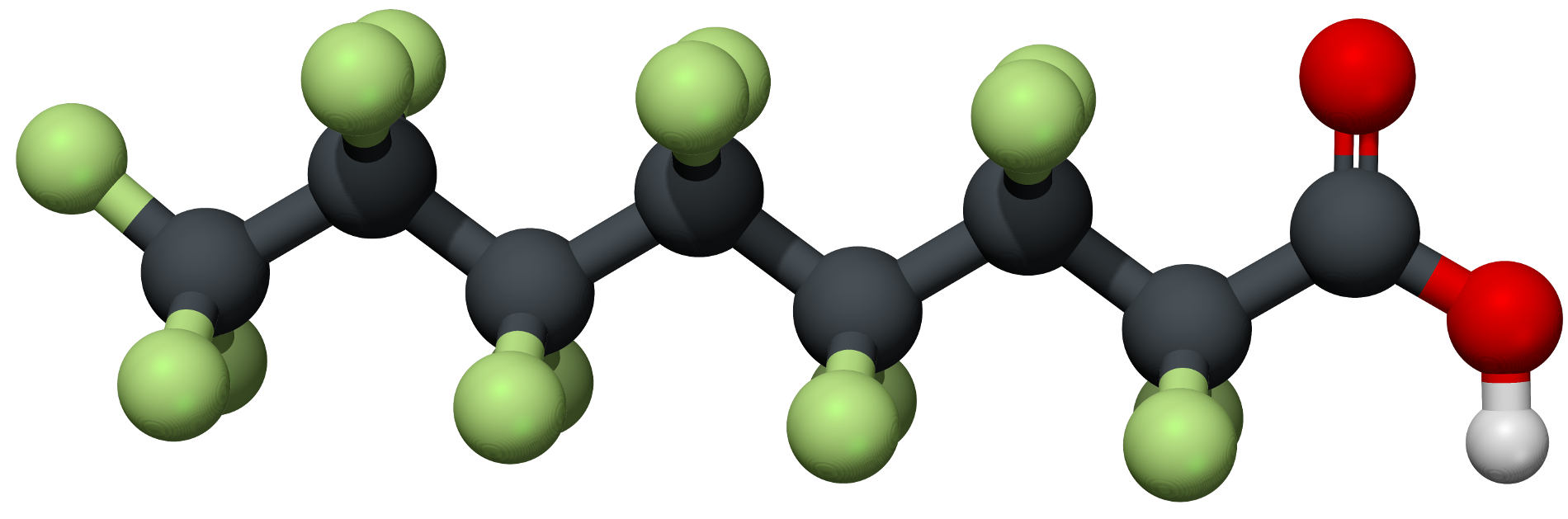

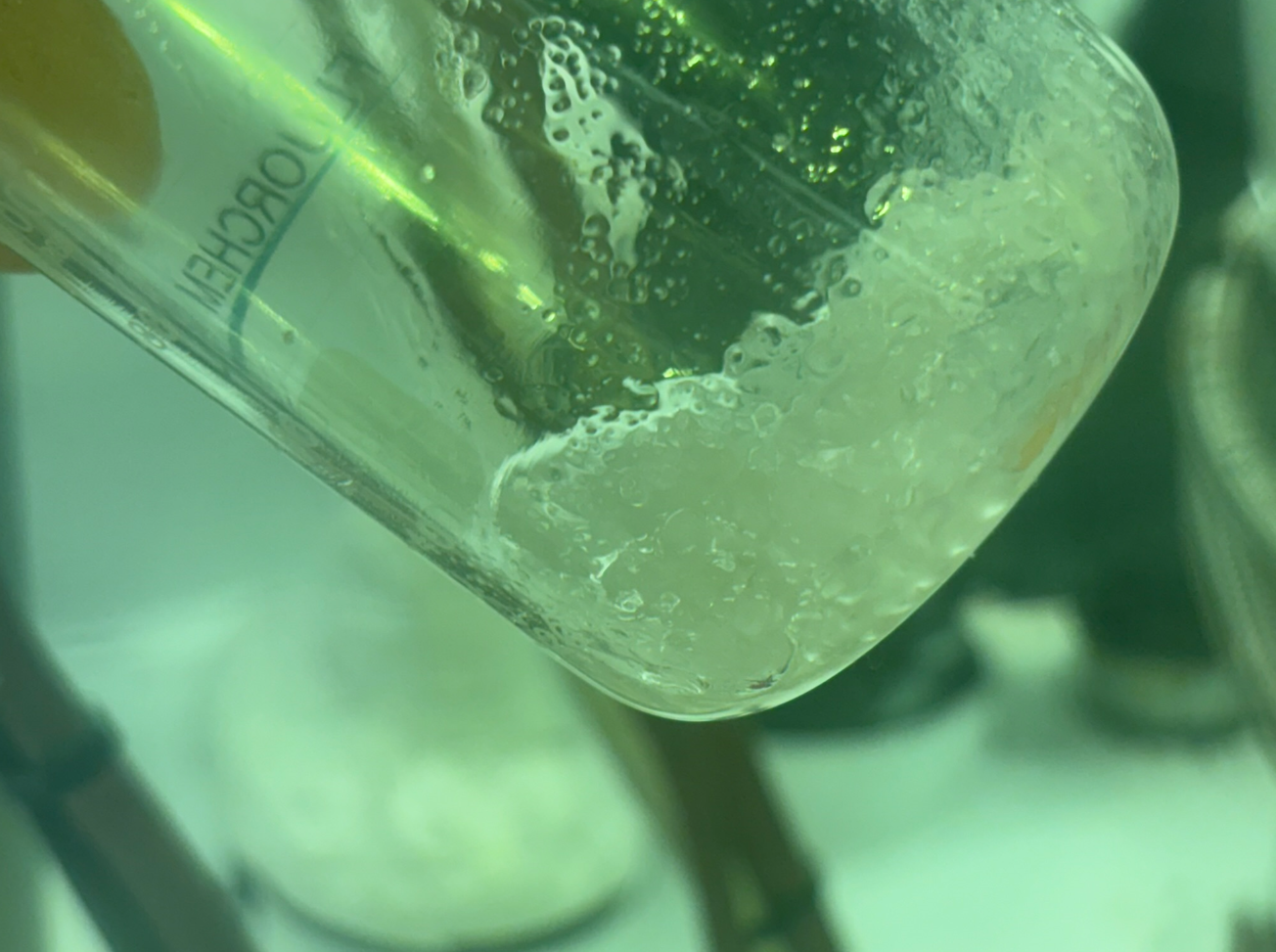
- Perfluorooctanoic acid visible in an emulsion

Names
- Preferred IUPAC name Pentadecafluorooctanoic acid
- Other names Perfluorooctanoic acid, PFOA, C8, Perfluorooctanoate, PFO, Perfluorocaprylic acid, C_{8}-PFCA, FC-143, F-n-octanoic acid

Identifiers
CAS Number	335-67-1
3D model (JSmol)	Interactive image
ChEBI	CHEBI:35549
ChEMBL	ChEMBL172988
ChemSpider	9180
ECHA InfoCard	100.005.817
EC Number	206-397-9
PubChem CID	9554
RTECS number	RH0781000
UNII	947VD76D3L
CompTox Dashboard (EPA)	DTXSID8031865
- InChI: InChI=1S/C8HF15O2/c9-2(10,1(24)25)3(11,12)4(13,14)5(15,16)6(17,18)7(19,20)8(21,22)23/h(H,24,25) Key: SNGREZUHAYWORS-UHFFFAOYSA-N; InChI=1/C8HF15O2/c9-2(10,1(24)25)3(11,12)4(13,14)5(15,16)6(17,18)7(19,20)8(21,22)23/h(H,24,25) Key: SNGREZUHAYWORS-UHFFFAOYAQ
- SMILES: FC(F)(C(F)(F)C(=O)O)C(F)(F)C(F)(F)C(F)(F)C(F)(F)C(F)(F)F

Properties
Chemical formula	C_{8}HF_{15}O_{2}
Molar mass	414.07 g/mol
Appearance	White solid
Density	1.8 g/cm^{3}
Melting point	40 to 50 °C (104 to 122 °F; 313 to 323 K)
Boiling point	189 to 192 °C (372 to 378 °F; 462 to 465 K)
Solubility in water	Soluble, 9.5 g/L (PFO)
Solubility in other solvents	Polar organic solvents
Acidity (pK_{a})	~0

Hazards
- Occupational safety and health (OHS/OSH)
Main hazards	Strong acid, known carcinogen and persistent organic pollutant
- GHS labelling
Pictograms	(GHS05: Corrosive) (GHS07: Exclamation mark) (GHS08: Health hazard)
Signal word	Danger
Hazard statements	H302, H318, H332, H351, H360, H362, H372
Precautionary statements	P201, P202, P260, P263, P264, P270, P271, P280, P281, P301+P312, P304+P312, P304+P340, P305+P351+P338, P308+P313, P310, P312, P314, P330, P405, P501
NFPA 704 (fire diamond)	3 0 0
- Safety data sheet (SDS)

Related compounds
Related compounds	Perfluorooctanesulfonic acid (PFOS); Perfluorononanoic acid (PFNA); Perfluorooctanesulfonamide (PFOSA); Trifluoroacetic acid (TFA)
- Except where otherwise noted, data are given for materials in their standard state (at 25 °C [77 °F], 100 kPa). verify (what is ?) Infobox references

Perfluorooctanoic acid (PFOA; conjugate base perfluorooctanoate; also known colloquially as C8, from its chemical formula C_{8}HF_{15}O_{2}) is a perfluorinated carboxylic acid produced and used worldwide as an industrial surfactant in chemical processes and as a chemical precursor. PFOA is considered a surfactant, or fluorosurfactant, due to its chemical structure, which consists of a perfluorinated, n-heptyl "tail group" and a carboxylic acid "head group". The head group can be described as hydrophilic while the fluorocarbon tail is both hydrophobic and lipophobic.

The International Agency for Research on Cancer (IARC) has classified PFOA as carcinogenic to humans. PFOA is one of many synthetic organofluorine compounds collectively known as per- and polyfluoroalkyl substances (PFASs). Many PFAS such as PFOS, PFOA are a concern because they do not break down via natural processes and are commonly described as persistent organic pollutants or "forever chemicals". They can also move through soils and contaminate drinking water sources and can build up (bioaccumulate) in fish and wildlife. Residues have been detected in humans and wildlife.

PFOA is used in several industrial applications, including carpeting, upholstery, apparel, floor wax, textiles, fire fighting foam and sealants. PFOA serves as a surfactant in the emulsion polymerization of fluoropolymers and as a chemical precursor for the synthesis of perfluoroalkyl-substituted compounds, polymers, and polymeric materials. PFOA has been manufactured since the 1940s in industrial quantities. It is also formed by the degradation of precursors such as some fluorotelomers. PFOA is used as a surfactant because it can lower the surface tension of water more than hydrocarbon surfactants while having exceptional stability due to having perfluoroalkyl tail group. The stability of PFOA is desired industrially but is a cause of concern environmentally.

The primary manufacturer of perfluorooctanesulfonic acid (PFOS), 3M, began a production phase-out in 2002 in response to concerns expressed by the U.S. Environmental Protection Agency (EPA). Eight other companies agreed to gradually phase out the manufacturing of the chemical by 2015.

By 2014, EPA had listed PFOA and perfluorooctanesulfonates (salts of perfluorooctanesulfonic acid, PFOS) as emergent contaminants:

PFOA and PFOS are extremely persistent in the environment and resistant to typical environmental degradation processes. [They] are widely distributed across the higher trophic levels and are found in soil, air and groundwater at sites across the United States. The toxicity, mobility and bioaccumulation potential of PFOS and PFOA pose potential adverse effects for the environment and human health.

In 2024 EPA published drinking water regulations for PFOA and five other PFAS.

== History ==
3M (then the Minnesota Mining and Manufacturing Company) began producing PFOA by electrochemical fluorination in 1947. Starting in 1951, DuPont purchased PFOA from 3M for use in the manufacturing of specific fluoropolymers—commercially branded as Teflon—but DuPont internally referred to PFOA as C8.

In 1968, organofluorine content was detected in the blood serum of consumers, and in 1976 it was suggested to be PFOA or a related compound such as PFOS.

In 1999, EPA ordered companies to examine the effects of perfluorinated chemicals after receiving data on the global distribution and toxicity of PFOS. For these reasons, and EPA pressure, in May 2000, 3M announced the phaseout of the production of PFOA, PFOS, and PFOS-related products—the company's best-selling repellent. 3M stated that they would have made the same decision regardless of EPA pressure.

Because of the 3M phaseout, in 2002, DuPont built its own plant in Fayetteville, North Carolina, to manufacture the chemical. The chemical has received attention due to litigation from the PFOA-contaminated community around DuPont's Washington Works facility in Washington, West Virginia, along with EPA focus. In 2004, ChemRisk—an "industry risk assessor" that had been contracted by Dupont, reported that over 1.7 million pounds of C8 had been "dumped, poured and released" into the environment from Dupont's Parkersburg, West Virginia-based Washington Works plant between 1951 and 2003.

Research on PFOA has demonstrated ubiquity, animal-based toxicity, and some associations with human health parameters and potential health effects. Additionally, advances in analytical chemistry in recent years have allowed the routine detection of low- and sub-parts per billion levels of PFOA in a variety of substances. In 2013, Gore-Tex eliminated the use of PFOAs in the manufacture of its weatherproof functional fabrics. Major companies producing PFOA signed with the Global PFOA Stewardship Program with the goal of elimination of PFOA by 2015. Since then it has been eliminated from the production of non-stick materials used in cookware. GenX has been introduced as a replacement for PFOA, but in a 2015 study which tested the effects on rats, GenX caused many of the same health problems as PFOA, but required much higher concentrations. This is because GenX (C3) is a short chain alternative to PFOA. GenX also has a significantly shorter half-life than PFOA so it is not as bio-persistent as PFOA or other long chain perfluorinated chemicals.

=== Robert Bilott investigation ===
In the Autumn of 2000, lawyer Robert Bilott, a partner at Taft Stettinius & Hollister, won a court order forcing DuPont to share all documentation related to PFOA. This included 110,000 files, consisting of confidential studies and reports conducted by DuPont scientists over decades. By 1993, DuPont understood that "PFOA caused cancerous testicular, pancreatic and liver tumors in lab animals" and the company began to investigate alternatives. However, because products manufactured with PFOA were such an integral part of DuPont's earnings, $1 billion in annual profit, they chose to continue using PFOA. Bilott learned that both "3M and DuPont had been conducting secret medical studies on PFOA for more than four decades", and by 1961 DuPont was aware of hepatomegaly in mice fed with PFOA.

Bilott exposed how DuPont had been knowingly polluting water with PFOAs in Parkersburg, West Virginia, since the 1980s. In the 1980s and 1990s, researchers investigated the toxicity of PFOA. Regarding a secret agreement between 3M and the government of Jersey (UK) to not perform group testing of residents and to help 3M avoid a class action, Billott told The Guardian: "I've not seen something like this where there's an agreement to try to help the company against claims by others, Particularly if it's something affecting public health and safety or research."

For his work in the exposure of the contamination, Bilott received several awards including The Right Livelihood Award in 2017. In film, this battle with DuPont has been depicted in the documentary The Devil We Know and the legal thriller Dark Waters.

== Synthesis ==
PFOA has two main synthesis routes, electrochemical fluorination (ECF) and telomerization. The ECF route sees octanoyl chloride (the acid chloride of octanoic acid) reacted with hydrofluoric acid. Multiple products are formed by ECF with the target acid fluoride F(CF_{2})_{7}COF being produced as only 10–15% of the yield, while the main products are perfluorinated cyclic ether isomers, including FC-75. This acid fluoride is hydrolyzed to yield PFOA as a mixture of straight-chain (78%), terminally branched (13%), and internally branched (9%) molecules, because ECF induces rearrangements in the carbon tail of the acid chloride. ECF also results in production wastes. 3M synthesized ECF PFOA at their Cottage Grove, Minnesota facility from 1947 to 2002 and was the world's largest producer. ECF production continues on a smaller scale in Europe and Asia.

PFOA is also synthesized by the telomerization represented below, where the telogen is the organoiodine compound and the taxogen is the tetrafluoroethylene. Each step is an addition reaction where the carbon-iodine bond of the telogen is added across the carbon-carbon double bond of the unsaturated taxogen, resulting in the formation of a new telogen.

CF_{3}CF_{2}I + F_{2}C=CF_{2} → CF_{3}CF_{2}CF_{2}CF_{2}I

CF_{3}(CF_{2})_{3}I + F_{2}C=CF_{2} → CF_{3}(CF_{2})_{5}I

CF_{3}(CF_{2})_{5}I + F_{2}C=CF_{2} → CF_{3}(CF_{2})_{7}I

The product is oxidized by SO_{3} to form PFOA. Since each addition produces a new teleomer, fluorotelomers like these form with varying length chains containing an even number of carbon atoms, depending on reaction conditions. Typically, most products within will contain between two and six taxogens (that is, from CF_{3}(CF_{2})_{5}I to CF_{3}(CF_{2})_{13}I). After oxidation, distillation is used to separate PFOA from the other perfluorinated carboxylic acids. The telomerization synthesis of PFOA was pioneered by DuPont, and is not well suited to the laboratory. PFOA formed by telomerization is completely linear, in contrast to the mixture of structures formed by ECF.

== Applications ==
PFOA has widespread applications. In 1976, PFOA was reported as a water and oil repellent "in fabrics and leather and in the production of floor waxes and waxed papers"; however, it is believed that paper is no longer treated with perfluorinated compounds, but with fluorotelomers with less than 0.1% PFOA. The compound is also used in "insulators for electric wires, planar etching of fused silica", fire fighting foam, and outdoor clothing. As a protonated species, the acid form of PFOA was the most widely used perfluorocarboxylic acid used as a reactive intermediate in the production of fluoroacrylic esters.

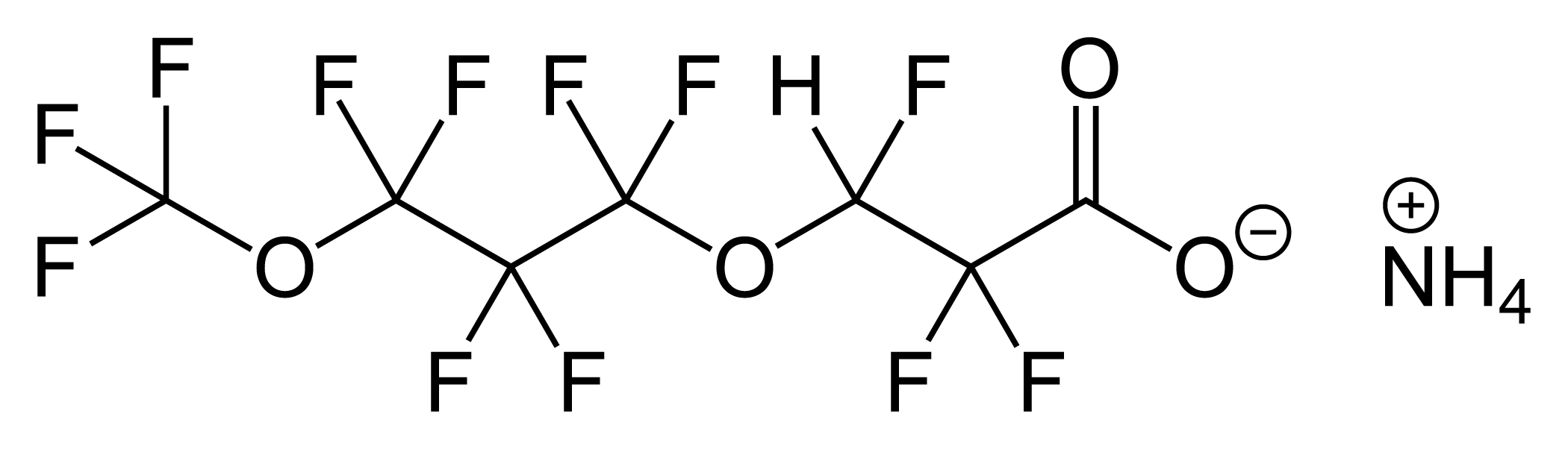
ADONA, ammonium 4,8-dioxa-3H-perfluorononanoate, is 3M's PFOA replacement in the emulsion polymerization of fluoropolymers.

As a salt, its dominant use is as an emulsifier for the emulsion polymerization of fluoropolymers such as PTFE, polyvinylidene fluoride, and fluoroelastomers. For this use, 3M subsidiary Dyneon has a replacement emulsifer despite DuPont stating PFOA is an "essential processing aid". In the past PFOA was used in the production of Gore-Tex as it is PTFE-based. In PTFE processing, PFOA is in aqueous solution and forms micelles that contain tetrafluoroethylene and the growing polymer. PFOA can be used to stabilize fluoropolymer and fluoroelastomer suspensions before further industrial processing and in ion-pair reversed-phase liquid chromatography it can act as an extraction agent. PFOA also finds uses in electronic products and as an industrial fluorosurfactant.

In a 2009 EPA study of 116 products, purchased between March 2007 and May 2008 and found to contain at least 0.01% fluorine by weight, the concentrations of PFOA were determined. Concentrations shown below range from not detected, or ND, (with the detection limit in parentheses) to 6750 with concentrations in nanograms of PFOA per gram of sample (parts per billion) unless stated otherwise.

Product	Range, ng/g
Pre-treated carpeting	ND (<1.5) to 462
Carpet-care liquids	19 to 6750
Treated apparel	5.4 to 161
Treated upholstery	0.6 to 293
Treated home textiles	3.8 to 438
Treated non-woven medical garments	46 to 369
Industrial floor wax and wax removers	7.5 to 44.8
Stone, tile, and wood sealants	477 to 3720
Membranes for apparel	0.1 to 2.5 ng/cm^{2}
Food contact paper	ND (<1.5) to 4640
Dental floss/tape	ND (<1.5) to 96.7
Thread sealant tape	ND (<1.5) to 3490
PTFE cookware	ND (<1.5) to 4.3

== Global occurrence and sources ==
PFOA contaminates every continent. Two of the most common types of PFAS (more precisely, PFOS and PFOA) were phased out of production in the United States (US) in 2002 and 2015 respectively, but are still present in some imported products. PFOA and PFOS are found in every American person's blood stream in the parts per billion range, though those concentrations have decreased by 70% for PFOA and 84% for PFOS between 1999 and 2014, which coincides with the end of the production and phase out of PFOA and PFOS in the US. PFOA has been detected in the central Pacific Ocean at low parts per quadrillion ranges, and at low parts per trillion (ppt) levels in coastal waters. Due to the surfactant nature of PFOA, it has been found to concentrate in the top layers of ocean water. PFOA is detected widely in surface waters, and is present in numerous mammals, fish, and bird species. PFOA is in the blood or vital organs of Atlantic salmon, swordfish, striped mullet, gray seals, common cormorants, Alaskan polar bears, brown pelicans, sea turtles, sea eagles, Midwestern bald eagles, California sea lions and Laysan albatrosses on Sand Island, a wildlife refuge on Midway Atoll, in the middle of the North Pacific Ocean, about halfway between North America and Asia. Because PFAS are ubiquitous in households, consumer products, food, and the environment generally, some trace levels reflecting this ubiquitous broad use of these compounds will make their way into the wastewater and solid waste streams.

However, wildlife has much less PFOA than humans, unlike PFOS and other longer perfluorinated carboxylic acids; in wildlife, PFOA is not as bioaccumulative as longer perfluorinated carboxylic acids. Municipal wastewater and landfill leachates are considered as important sources of PFOA to the environment.

Most industrialized nations have average PFOA blood serum levels ranging from 2 to 8 parts per billion; the highest consumer sub-population identified was in Korea—with about 60 parts per billion. In Peru, Vietnam, and Afghanistan blood serum levels have been recorded to be below one part per billion. In 2003–2004 99.7% of Americans had detectable PFOA in their serum with an average of about 4 parts per billion, and concentrations of PFOA in US serum have declined by 25% in recent years. Despite a decrease in PFOA, the longer perfluorinated carboxylic acid PFNA is increasing in the blood of US consumers. PFAS are also found in paper mill residuals, digestates, composts, and soils. Given the ubiquity of PFAS, and the comparative background levels which may be found in wastewater, biosolids, and leachates, setting requirements near analytical detection limits on these sources may not provide a discernable benefit to protecting public health.

=== Industrial sources ===
PFOA is released directly from industrial sites. For example, the estimate for the DuPont Washington Works facility is a total PFOA emissions of 80,000 pounds (lbs) in 2000 and 1,700 pounds in 2004. A 2006 study, with two of four authors being DuPont employees, estimated about 80% of historical perfluorocarboxylate emissions were released to the environment from fluoropolymer manufacture and use. PFOA can be measured in water from industrial sites other than fluorochemical plants. PFOA has also been detected in emissions from the carpet industry, paper and electronics industries. The most important emission sources are carpet and textile protection products, as well as fire-fighting foams.

=== Precursors ===
8:2 fluorotelomer alcohol, (8:2 FTOH), degrades environmentally to PFOA

PFOA can form as a breakdown product from a variety of precursor molecules. In fact, the main products of the fluorotelomer industry, fluorotelomer-based polymers, have been shown to degrade to form PFOA and related compounds, with half-lives of decades, both biotically and by simple abiotic reaction with water. It has been argued that fluorotelomer-based polymers already produced might be major sources of PFOA globally for decades to come. Other precursors that degrade to PFOA include 8:2 fluorotelomer alcohol (F(CF_{2})_{8}CH_{2}CH_{2}OH), polyfluoroalkyl phosphate surfactants (PAPS), and possibly N-EtFOSE alcohol (F(CF_{2})_{8}SO_{2}N(Et)CH_{2}CH_{2}OH). When PTFE (Teflon) is degraded by heat (pyrolysis) it can form PFOA as a minor product. The Organisation for Economic Co-operation and Development (OECD) has compiled a list of 615 chemicals that have the potential to break down into perfluorocarboxylic acids (PFCA) including PFOA. However, not all 615 have the potential to break down to form PFOA.

A majority of waste water treatment plants (WWTPs) that have been tested output more PFOA than is input, and this increased output has been attributed to the biodegradation of fluorotelomer alcohols. A current PFOA precursor concern are fluorotelomer-based polymers; fluorotelomer alcohols attached to hydrocarbon backbones via ester linkages may detach and be free to biodegrade to PFOA.

=== Sources to people ===
Food, drinking water, outdoor air, indoor air, dust, and food packagings are all implicated as sources of PFOA to people. However, it is unclear which exposure routes dominate because of data gaps. When water is a source, blood levels are approximately 100 times higher than drinking water levels.

People who lived in the PFOA-contaminated area around DuPont's Washington Works facility were found to have higher levels of PFOA in their blood from drinking water. The highest PFOA levels in drinking water were found in the Little Hocking water system, with an average concentration of 3.55 parts per billion during 2002–2005. Individuals who drank more tap water, ate locally grown fruits and vegetables, or ate local meat, were all associated with having higher PFOA levels. Residents who used water carbon filter systems had lower PFOA levels.

In Jersey, UK, 18% of residents of an area were found to have elevated levels of PFOA, downstream from 3M fire retardant tests in weekly fire-service practice from the 1960s to the mid 1990s. Bloodletting is used for these residents at a cost of $4500 per patient. The potatoes of the island were found to contain 10x the EU limit of PFOS.

==== Food contact surfaces ====
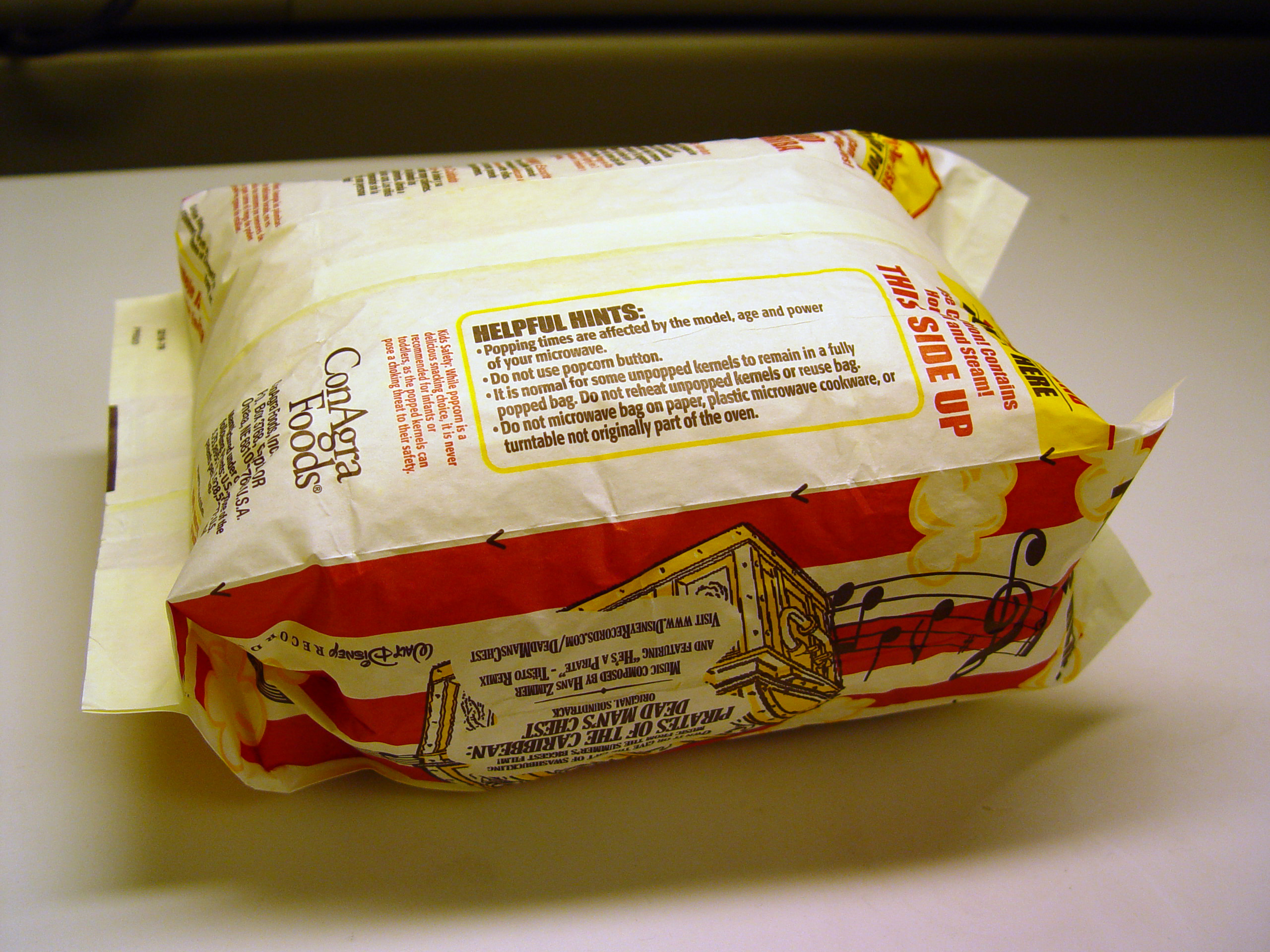
Microwave popcorn bags can contain residual PFOA from fluorotelomers.

PFOA is also formed as an unintended byproduct in the production of fluorotelomers and is present in finished goods treated with fluorotelomers, including those intended for food contact. Fluorotelomers are applied to food contact papers because they are lipophobic: they prevent oil from soaking into the paper from fatty foods. Also, fluorotelomers can be metabolized into PFOA. In a U.S. Food and Drug Administration (USFDA) study, lipophobic fluorotelomer-based paper coatings (which can be applied to food contact paper in the concentration range of 0.4%) were found to contain 88,000–160,000 parts per billion PFOA before application, while the oil from microwave popcorn bags contained 6–290 parts per billion PFOA after heating. Toxicologists estimate that microwave popcorn could account for about 20% of the PFOA levels measured in an individual consuming 10 bags a year if 1% of the fluorotelomers are metabolized to PFOA.

In 2008 as news stories began to raise concerns about PFOA in microwaved popcorn, Dan Turner, DuPont's global public relations chief, said, "I serve microwave popcorn to my three-year-old." Five years later, journalist Peter Laufer wrote to Turner to ask if his child was still eating microwave popcorn. "I am not going to comment on such a personal inquiry", Turner replied.

Fluorotelomer coatings are used in fast food wrappers, candy wrappers, and pizza box liners. PAPS, a type of paper fluorotelomer coating, and PFOA precursor, is also used in food contact papers.

Despite DuPont's assertion that "cookware coated with DuPont Teflon non-stick coatings does not contain PFOA", residual PFOA was also detected in finished PTFE products including PTFE cookware (4–75 parts per billion). However, PFOA levels ranged from undetectable (<1.5) to 4.3 parts per billion in a more recent study. Also, non-stick cookware is heated—which should volatilize PFOA; PTFE products that are not heated, such as PTFE sealant tape, had higher (1800 parts per billion) levels detected. Overall, PTFE cookware is considered an insignificant exposure pathway to PFOA.

==== Potential path: sludge to food ====
PFOA and PFOS were detected in "very high" (low parts per million) levels in agricultural fields for grazing beef cattle and crops around Decatur, Alabama. The approximately 5000 acres of land were fertilized with "treated municipal sewage sludge, or biosolids". PFOA was also detected in fodder grass grown in these soils and the blood of the cattle feeding on this grass. The water treatment plant received process wastewater from a nearby perfluorochemical manufacturing plant. 3M says they managed their own wastes, but Daikin America "discharged process wastewater to the municipal waste treatment plant". If traced to meat, it would be the first time perfluorochemicals were traced from sludge to food. However, the USDA reported—with a detection limits of 20 parts per billion—non-detectable levels for both PFOA and PFOS in cattle muscle tissue.

==== Household dust ====
PFOA is frequently found in household dust, making it an important exposure route for adults, but more substantially, children. Children have higher exposures to PFOA through dust compared to adults. Hand-to-mouth contact and proximity to high concentrations of dust make them more susceptible to ingestion, and increases PFOA exposure. One study showed significant positive associations were recognized between dust ingestion and PFOA serum concentrations. However, an alternate study found exposure due to dust ingestion was associated with minimal risk.

==== Menstrual pads ====
In 2024 it was reported that a brand of menstrual pad was found to contain PFOA.

== Regulatory status ==
=== Drinking water and products ===
In April 2024 EPA issued a final drinking water rule for PFOA, PFOS, GenX, PFBS, PFNA, and PFHxS. Public water systems must remove these six PFAS to near-zero levels by 2027. Grant funding is available from EPA to assist utilities in water testing and development of treatment systems.

The State of New Jersey published drinking water standards for PFOA and PFOS in 2020. A standard for PFNA was published in 2018. This was the first state to publish PFAS standards in the absence of federal regulations. See U.S. state government actions.

In 2018 the State of New York adopted drinking water standards of 10 ppt for PFOA and 10 ppt for PFOS, the most stringent such standards in the United States. The standards apply to public water systems and took effect in 2019 after a public comment period.

Using information gained through a Freedom of Information Act request, in May 2018 it was learned that January 2018 emails between the EPA, the Office of Management and Budget, the Department of Defense, and the Department of Health and Human Services showed an effort to suppress the release of a draft report on the toxicology of PFOS and PFOA done by the Agency for Toxic Substances and Disease Registry. The report found that these chemicals endanger human health at a far lower level than EPA has previously called safe. After media accounts of the effort surfaced, the regional EPA administrator for Colorado denied that EPA had anything to do with suppressing the report. The report was released on June 21, 2018.

The new ATSDR analysis derives provisional Minimal Risk Levels (MRLs) of 3 × 10^{−6} mg/kg/day for PFOA and 2 × 10^{−6} mg/kg/day for PFOS during intermediate exposure. The European Food Safety Authority opinion sets a provisional tolerable weekly intake (TWI) of 6 × 10^{−6} mg/kg body weight per week for PFOA.

=== California and food packaging ===
An attempt to regulate PFOA in food packaging occurred in the US state of California in 2008. A bill, sponsored by State Senator Ellen Corbett and the Environmental Working Group, was passed in the house and senate that would have banned PFOA, PFOS, and seven or more related fluorinated carbon compounds in food packaging starting in 2010, but the bill was vetoed by Governor Schwarzenegger. The bill would have affected fluorochemical manufacturers outside of the state. Schwarzenegger said the compound should be reviewed by the newly established, and more comprehensive, state program.

=== Fluorotelomers ===
Fluorotelomer-based products have been shown to degrade to PFOA over periods of decades; these studies could lead EPA to require DuPont and others to reformulate products with a value over $1 billion.

== Health effects ==
=== Toxicology ===
PFOA is a possible carcinogen, a possible liver toxicant, a possible developmental toxicant, and a possible immune system toxicant, and also exerts hormonal effects including alteration of thyroid hormone levels at very high concentrations. Animal studies show developmental toxicity from reduced birth size, physical developmental delays, endocrine disruption, and neonatal mortality. PFOA alters lipid metabolism.

In 2008, PFOA has been described as a member of a group of "classic non-genotoxic carcinogens". However, a provisional German assessment notes that a 2005 study found PFOA to be genotoxic via a peroxisome proliferation pathway that produced oxygen radicals in HepG2 cells, and a 2006 study demonstrated the induction and suppression of a broad range of genes; therefore, it states that the indirect genotoxic (and thus carcinogenic) potential of PFOA cannot be dismissed. As of November 2023, the International Agency for Research on Cancer (IARC) has classified PFOA as carcinogenic to humans (Group 1) based on "sufficient" evidence for cancer in animals and "strong" mechanistic evidence in exposed humans.

An additional study has shown PFOA to be developmentally toxic, hepatotoxic, immunotoxic, and to have negative effects of thyroid hormone production.

=== Human data ===
PFOA is resistant to degradation by natural processes such as metabolism, hydrolysis, photolysis, or biodegradation and has been found to persist in the environment. PFOA is found in environmental and biological fluids as the anion perfluorooctanoate. PFOA can be absorbed from ingestion and can penetrate skin. The acid headgroup of PFOA enables binding to proteins with fatty acid or hormone substrates such as serum albumin, liver fatty acid-binding protein, and the nuclear receptors PPARα and possibly CAR.

In animals, PFOA is mainly present in the liver, blood, and kidneys. PFOA does not accumulate in fat tissue, unlike traditional organohalogen persistent organic pollutants. In humans, PFOA has an average elimination half-life of about three years. Because of this long half-life, PFOA has the potential to bioaccumulate.

The levels of PFOA exposure in humans vary widely. While an average American might have 3 or 4 parts per billion of PFOA present in their blood serum, individuals occupationally exposed to PFOA have had blood serum levels over 100,000 parts per billion (100 parts per million or 0.01%) recorded. While no amount of PFOA in humans is legally recognized as harmful, DuPont was "not satisfied" with data showing their Chinese workers accumulated an average of about 2,250 parts per billion of PFOA in their blood from a starting average of around 50 parts per billion less than a year prior.

==== Consumers ====
Single cross-sectional studies on consumers have been published noting multiple associations. Blood serum levels of PFOA were associated with an increased time to pregnancy—or "infertility"—in a 2009 study. PFOA exposure was associated with decreased semen quality, increased serum alanine aminotransferase levels, and increased occurrence of thyroid disease. In a study of 2003–2004 US samples, a higher (9.8 milligram per deciliter) total cholesterol level was observed when the highest quartile was compared to the lowest. Along with other related compounds, PFOA exposure was associated with an increased risk of attention deficit hyperactivity disorder (ADHD) in a study of US children aged 12–15. In a paper presented at the 2009 annual meeting of the International Society of Environmental Epidemiology, PFOA appeared to act as an endocrine disruptor by a potential mechanism on breast maturation in young girls. A C8 Science Panel status report noted an association between exposure in girls and a later onset of puberty.

Other impacts on exposure in utero

PFOA exposure on thyroid function has also been a topic of concern, and has found to negatively impact thyroid stimulating hormone even at low levels when exposed during fetal development. PFOA is also shown to have obesogenic effects, and an experimental study found a positive correlation to low-dose prenatal exposure of PFOA and prevalence of overweight and high waist circumference in females at age 20. A correlation between in utero PFOA exposure and mental performance has yet to be established, as many studies have resulted in insignificant results. For example, a study conducted near Parkersburg, West Virginia did not find a significant association between in utero PFOA exposure and performance of math skills or reading performance in children ages 6 to 12 living in the PFOA-contaminated water district. Based on a cohort study conducted in the Mid-Ohio Valley, no clear association was found between prenatal exposure to PFOA and birth defects, although a possible association with brain defects was observed and requires further research and assessment.

Extrapolated epidemiological data suggests a slight association between PFOA exposure and low birth weight. This was consistent based on blood levels of PFOA metabolites regardless of the geographic residence of subjects. Generally, the findings among human fetuses exposed to the chemical were considerably less drastic than what was seen in mice studies. Because of this, studies linking exposure to low birth weight can be considered inconclusive. PFOA exposure in the Danish general population was not associated with an increased risk of prostate, bladder, pancreatic, or liver cancer. Maternal PFOA levels were not associated with an offspring's increased risk of hospitalization due to infectious diseases, behavioral and motor coordination problems, or delays in reaching developmental milestones.

==== Employees and DuPont exposed community ====
In 2010, the three members of the C8 Science Panel published a review of the epidemiological evidence on PFOA exposure in Environmental Health Perspectives. Insufficient evidence exists to conclude PFOA causes adverse health effects in humans, but consistent evidence exists on associations with higher cholesterol and uric acid. Whether or not these potential effects result in an increase in cardiovascular disease is unknown. Further data on the 69,030 member cohort that is being studied by the panel is scheduled for release through 2012. A 2011 epidemiological study demonstrated "probable link" between PFOA and kidney cancer, testicular cancer, thyroid disease, high cholesterol, pre-eclampsia and ulcerative colitis.

Facial birth defects, an effect observed in rat offspring, occurred with the children of two out of seven female DuPont employees from the Washington Works facility from 1979 to 1981. Bucky Bailey is one of the affected individuals; DuPont, however, does not accept any liability from the toxicity of PFOA. While 3M sent DuPont results from a study that showed birth defects to rats administered PFOA and DuPont moved the women out of the Teflon production unit, subsequent animal testing led DuPont to conclude there was no reproductive risk to women, and they were returned to the production unit. However, data released in March 2009 on the community around DuPont's Washington Works plant showed "a modest, imprecise indication of an elevation in risk ... above the 90th percentile ... based on 12 cases in the uppermost category", which was deemed "suggestive of a possible relationship" between PFOA exposure and birth defects.

== Legal actions ==
=== International action: Stockholm Convention ===
PFOA was proposed for listing under the Stockholm Convention on Persistent Organic Pollutants in 2015, and on May 10, 2019, PFOA, its salts, and PFOA-related compounds were added to Annex A of the Stockholm Convention by the Conference of the Parties. Several hundred salts and precursors of PFOA fall within the scope of the restriction. A few specific exemptions remained. Among them is a time-bound exemption for PFOA in fire-fighting foam.

=== Industry and legal actions ===
DuPont has used PFOA for over 50 years at its Washington Works plant. Area residents sued DuPont in August 2001 and claimed DuPont released PFOA in excess of their community guideline of 1 part per billion resulting in lower property values and increased risk of illness. The class was certified by Wood Circuit Court Judge George W. Hill. As part of the settlement, DuPont has paid for blood tests and health surveys of residents believed to be affected. Participants numbered 69,030 in the study, which was reviewed by three epidemiologists—the C8 Science Panel—to determine if any health effects are the likely result of exposure.

On December 13, 2005, DuPont announced a settlement with the EPA in which DuPont would pay US$10.25 million in fines and an additional US$6.25 million for two supplemental environmental projects without any admission of liability.

On September 30, 2008, Chief Judge Joseph R. Goodwin of the United States District Court for the Southern District of West Virginia denied the certification of a class of Parkersburg residents exposed to PFOA from DuPont's facility because they did not "show the common individual injuries needed to certify a class action". On September 28, 2009, Judge Goodwin dismissed the claims of those residents except for medical monitoring. By 2015, more than three thousand plaintiffs have filed personal-injury lawsuits against DuPont. In 2017, DuPont reached a $670.7 million cash settlement related to 3,550 personal injury lawsuits tied to PFOA contamination of drinking water in the Parkersburg area. Chemours, which was spun off from DuPont in 2015, agreed to pay half the settlement. Both companies denied any wrongdoing.

==== Jersey ====
The government of Jersey signed a confidential agreement with 3M in 2005, agreeing to not pursue legal claims for £2.6m. Jersey must assist 3M in the defense of future claims.

A source told The Guardian that Jersey needed 3M's permission to proceed with blood tests to avoid 3M punitive measures. "The state got an agreement to do individual blood tests, but not screening, as that could be the first step towards a possible class action lawsuit."

=== U.S. federal government actions ===
In 2002, a panel of toxicologists, including several from EPA, proposed a level of 150 ppb for drinking water in the PFOA contaminated area around DuPont's Washington Works plant. This initially proposed level was much higher than any known environmental concentration and was over 2,000 times the level EPA eventually settled on for the drinking water health advisory.

In July 2004, EPA filed a suit against DuPont alleging "widespread contamination" of PFOA near the Parkersburg, West Virginia plant "at levels exceeding the company's community exposure guidelines"; the suit also alleged that "DuPont had—over a 20 year period—repeatedly failed to submit information on adverse effects (in particular, information on liver enzyme alterations and birth defects in offspring of female Parkersburg workers)."

In October 2005, a USFDA study was published revealing PFOA and PFOA precursor chemicals in food contact and PTFE products.

On January 25, 2006, EPA announced a voluntary program with several chemical companies to reduce PFOA and PFOA precursor emissions by the year 2015.

On February 15, 2005, EPA's Science Advisory Board (SAB) voted to recommended that PFOA should be considered a "likely human carcinogen".

On May 26, 2006, EPA's SAB addressed a letter to Administrator Stephen L. Johnson. Three-quarters of advisers thought the stronger "likely to be carcinogenic" descriptor was warranted, in opposition to EPA's own PFOA hazard descriptor of "suggestive evidence of carcinogenicity, but not sufficient to assess human carcinogenic potential".

On November 21, 2006, EPA ordered DuPont to offer alternative drinking water or treatment for public or private water users living near DuPont's Washington Works plant in West Virginia (and in Ohio), if the level of PFOA detected in drinking water is equal to or greater than 0.5 parts per billion. This measure sharply lowered the previous action level of 150 parts per billion that was established in March 2002.

According to a May 23, 2007, Environmental Science & Technology Online article, U.S. Food and Drug Administration research regarding food contact papers as a potential source of PFOA to humans is ongoing.

In November 2007, the Centers for Disease Control and Prevention (CDC) published data on PFOA concentrations comparing 1999–2000 vs. 2003–2004 NHANES samples.

In October 2021 the EPA proposed to designate PFOA and PFOS as hazardous substances in its PFAS Strategic Roadmap. In September 2022 the EPA proposed to designate as hazardous substances under the Superfund Comprehensive Environmental Response, Compensation, and Liability Act of 1980 (CERCLA).

In 2024 EPA published drinking water regulations for PFOA and five other PFAS.

=== U.S. state government actions ===
==== New Jersey ====
In 2007 the New Jersey Department of Environmental Protection (NJDEP) announced that it found PFOA at "elevated levels in the system's drinking water near DuPont's massive Chambers Works chemical plant".

In 2018 the state published a drinking water standard for PFNA. Public water systems in New Jersey are required to meet a maximum contaminant level (MCL) standard of 13 ppt.

In 2019 New Jersey filed lawsuits against the owners of two plants that had manufactured PFASs (the Chambers Works and the Parlin plant in Sayreville), and two plants that were cited for water pollution from other chemicals. The companies cited are DuPont, Chemours and 3M.

In 2020 the NJDEP set a PFOA standard at 14 ppt and a PFOS standard at 13 ppt.

==== New York ====
In 2018 the New York State Department of Health adopted drinking water standards of 10 ppt for PFOA and 10 ppt for PFOS, effective in 2019 after a public comment period.

==== Michigan ====
In November 2017, the Michigan PFAS Action Response Team (MPART) was created to address growing pollution concerns after multiple sites contaminated by PFAS were identified. MPART is a multi-agency team tasked with investigating PFAS contamination sites and sources in the state, protecting drinking water, enhancing interagency communication and keeping the public informed.

In January 2018, Michigan established a legally enforceable groundwater cleanup level of 70 ppt for both PFOA and PFOS. Two science advisory committees were also created and joined MPART to "coordinate and review medical and environmental health, PFAS science and develop evidence-based recommendations".

In August 2020, the Michigan Department of Environment, Great Lakes, and Energy adopted stricter drinking water standards in the form of MCLs, lowering acceptable levels from the 2018 enforceable groundwater cleanup levels of 70 ppt to 8 ppt for PFOA and 16 ppt for PFOS and adding MCLs for 5 previously unregulated PFAS compounds PFNA, PFHxA, PFHxS, PFBS, and HFPO-DA.

==== Minnesota ====
In 2007, the Minnesota Department of Health lowered its Health Based Value for PFOA in drinking water from 1.0 ppb to 0.5 ppb, where "the sources are landfilled industrial wastes from a 3M manufacturing plant".

=== European action ===
PFOA contaminated waste was incorporated into soil improver and spread on agricultural land in Germany, leading to PFOA drinking water contamination of up to 0.519 parts per billion. The German Federal Environmental Agency issued guidelines for the sum of PFOA and PFOS concentrations in drinking water: 0.1 parts per billion for precaution and 0.3 parts per billion for a threshold. Residents were found to have a 6–8 factor increase of PFOA serum levels over unexposed Germans, with average PFOA concentrations in the 22–27 parts per billion range. An expert panel concluded that "concentrations were considered too low to cause overt adverse health effects in the exposed population".

In the Netherlands, after questions by members of Parliament, the minister of Environment ordered a study into the potential exposure to PFOA of people living in the vicinity of the DuPont factory in Dordrecht. The report was published in March 2016 and concluded that "prior to 2002 residents were exposed to levels of PFOA at which health effects could not be ruled out". As a result of this, the government commissioned several further studies, including blood tests and measurements in drinking water.

PFOA was identified as a PBT substance in the EU in 2013. It was then included in the candidate list of substances of very high concern. In 2017, PFOA, its salts and PFOA-related substances were added to annex XVII (restriction) of the REACH Regulation.

The EU adopted the listing of PFOA in Annex A of the Stockholm Convention with Commission Delegated Regulation (EU) 2020/784 of 8 April 2020 and introduced a limit value of 0,025 mg/kg for PFOA including its salts, and at 1 mg/kg for the individual PFOA-related compounds or a combination of those compounds. They also included some specific exemptions. Among them is a time-bound exemption for PFOA in fire-fighting foam.

=== Australian action ===
On August 10, 2016, Australian litigation funder IMF Bentham announced an agreement to fund a class action led by the law firm Gadens against the Australian Department of Defence for economic losses to homeowners, fishers, and farmers resulting from the use of aqueous film forming foam (containing PFOA) at RAAF Base Williamtown.

== See also ==
- Timeline of events related to per- and polyfluoroalkyl substances (PFAS)
