= Surflon S-111 =

Perfluorononanoic acid, the predominant compound present in Surflon S-111

Surflon S-111 (CAS 72968-3-88) is a commercial product consisting of perfluorinated carboxylic acids (PFCAs) in ammonium salt form. It is commonly used as a polymerization aid in the production of fluoropolymers.

The dominant chemical compound is perfluorononanoic acid (PFNA) at 74% by weight, followed by the 11 carbon perfluoroundecanoic acid (20%), and the 13 carbon perfluorotridecanoic acid (5%).

Surflon S-111 is synthesized in Japan by oxidizing a mixture of fluorotelomer olefins. Fluorotelomer olefins are synthesized using a telomerization of tetrafluoroethylene taxogens (monomers), followed by an ethylene insertion. The olefin is oxidized, removing one carbon to yield products with an odd number of carbons with even-lengthed fluorocarbon chains plus a carboxylic acid group. As the fluorotelomer olefins are dominated by F(CF_{2})_{8}CH=CH_{2}, PFNA is the major PFCA product.

Surflon S-111 "is described as Fatty acids, C7-C13, perfluoro, ammonium salts".

== See also ==
- Fluorosurfactants
