= Pentanoyl chloride =

Names
- Preferred IUPAC name Pentanoyl chloride
- Other names Valeroyl chloride; n-Pentanoyl chloride

Identifiers
| CAS Number | 638-29-9 |
| 3D model (JSmol) | Interactive image |
| ChEMBL | ChEMBL1607711 |
| ChemSpider | 55132 |
| ECHA InfoCard | 100.010.301 |
| EC Number | 211-330-1 |
| PubChem CID | 61186 |
| UNII | KJ3B4CY5GG |
| UN number | 2502 |
| CompTox Dashboard (EPA) | DTXSID2034091 |
- InChI: InChI=1S/C5H9ClO/c1-2-3-4-5(6)7/h2-4H2,1H3 Key: XGISHOFUAFNYQF-UHFFFAOYSA-N
- SMILES: CCCCC(=O)Cl

Properties
| Chemical formula | C_{5}H_{9}ClO |
| Molar mass | 120.58 g·mol^{−1} |

Related compounds
| Related compounds | Butyryl chloride Hexanoyl chloride |
- Except where otherwise noted, data are given for materials in their standard state (at 25 °C [77 °F], 100 kPa). Infobox references

Pentanoyl chloride is an acyl chloride derived from pentanoic acid. It is a colorless liquid that is used to attach the valeroyl group. It is usually produced by chlorination of valeric acid.

== Reactions ==
Like related acyl chlorides, valeroyl chloride hydrolyzes readily:

CH_{3}(CH_{2})_{3}C(O)Cl + H_{2}O → CH_{3}(CH_{2})_{3}CO_{2}H + HCl

Alcohols react to give esters:

CH_{3}(CH_{2})_{3}C(O)Cl + ROH → CH_{3}(CH_{2})_{3}CO_{2}R + HCl

Amines react to give amides:

CH_{3}(CH_{2})_{3}C(O)Cl + R_{2}NH → CH_{3}(CH_{2})_{3}C(O)NR_{2} + HCl

Benzene reacts under conditions of the Friedel-Crafts reaction to give valerophenone:

CH_{3}(CH_{2})_{3}C(O)Cl + C_{6}H_{6} → CH_{3}(CH_{2})_{3}C(O)C_{6}H_{5} + HCl
