= Acyl fluorides =

Class of chemical compounds

Acyl fluorides are organofluorine compounds with the formula RC(O)F (R = alkyl, aryl). In terms of structure, they resemble the more common acyl chlorides, i.e., an acyl group bonded to a halide. The synthesis and properties of acyl fluorides are somewhat distinctive however.

== Preparation ==
The several routes to acyl fluorides can be roughly subdivided into three approaches.

=== Halide exchange ===
Acyl chlorides react with hydrogen fluoride to give acyl fluorides. This reaction is relevant to the use of electrofluorination route to perfluorinated carboxylic acids, such as PFOA.

=== S- and P-based reagents ===
The OH group of carboxylic acids can be converted to fluoride using various oxophilic reagents. Aromatic (as well as aliphatic) acyl fluorides can be prepared from carboxylic acids with PPh_{3} and fluoride sources. Cyanuric fluoride as well as sulfur tetrafluoride also convert carboxylic acids to acyl fluorides.

SF_{4} + RCO_{2}H → SOF_{2} + RC(O)F + HF

=== Fluorophosgene ===
Salts of trifluoromethoxide react with carboxylic acids to give acyl fluorides. The process entails formation of difluorophosgene. Solutions of trifluoromethoxide are prepared by displacement from aryl trifluoromethyl ethers.

== Reactions ==
A common reaction of acyl fluorides is hydrolysis to the carboxylic acid.

Perfluoroacyl fluorides react with fluoride salts to perfluoroalkoxides:

C_{3}F_{7}COF + F^{−} → C_{4}F_{9}O^{−}

== Utility ==
Acyl fluorides are intermediates in the electrochemical fluorination (ECF) route to perfluorocarboxylic acids, such as perfluorooctanoic acid).
