= Perfluorobutanoic acid =

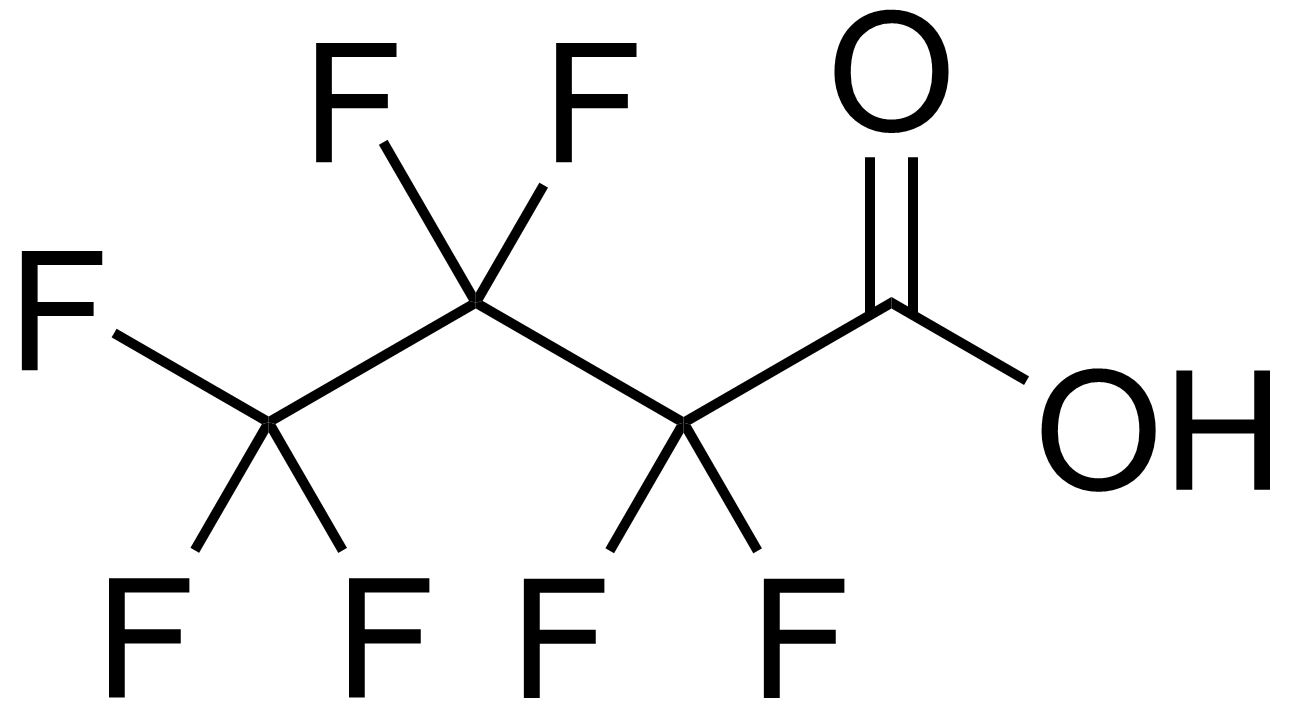

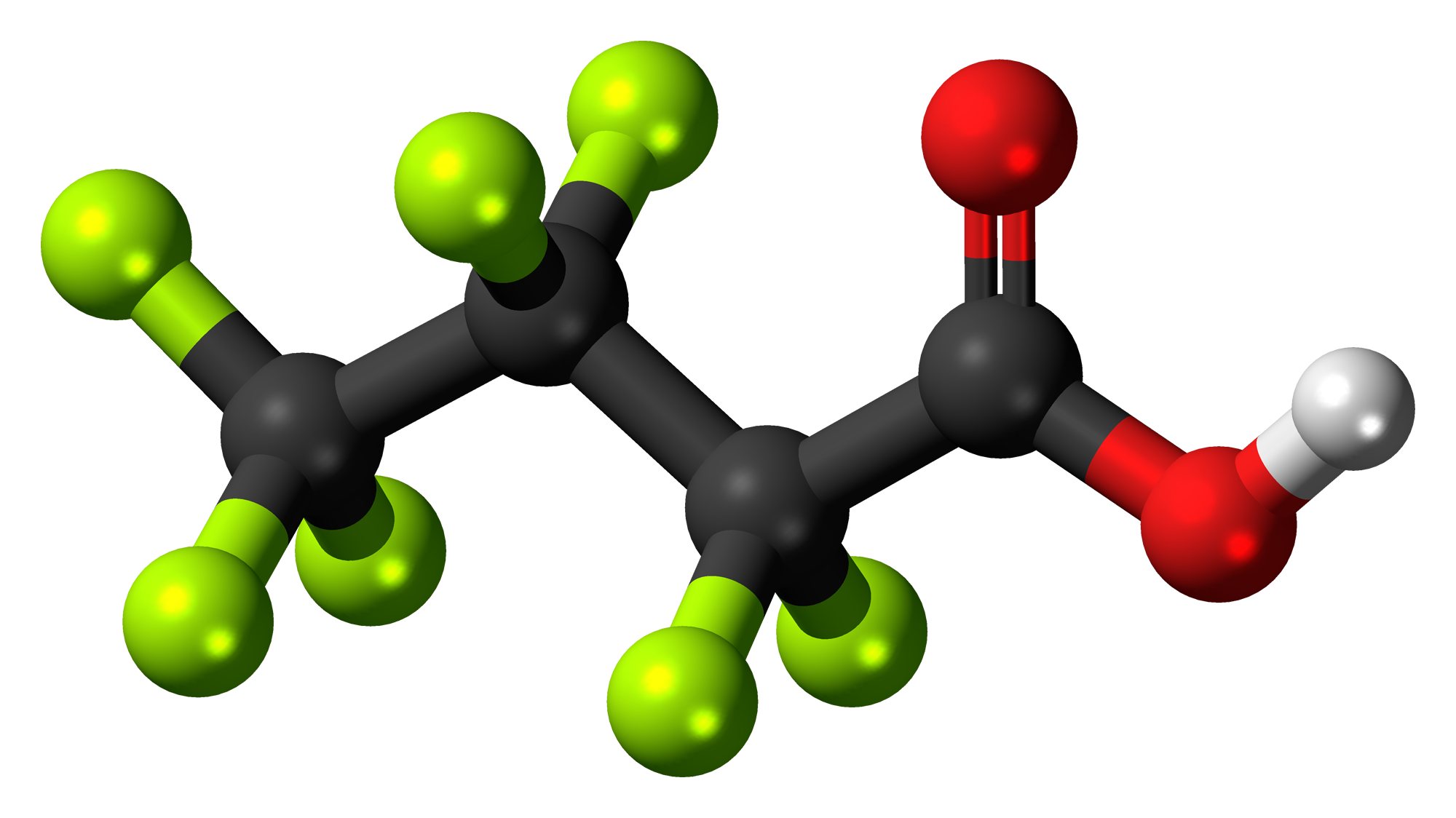

Names
- Preferred IUPAC name Heptafluorobutanoic acid
- Other names Perfluorobutanoic acid Perfluorobutyric acid Heptafluorobutyric acid HFBA; PFBA; C_{4} PFCA

Identifiers
CAS Number	375-22-4
3D model (JSmol)	Interactive image
Abbreviations	HFBA
ChEBI	CHEBI:39426
ChemSpider	9394
ECHA InfoCard	100.006.170
PubChem CID	9777
UNII	12VHZ8L29I
CompTox Dashboard (EPA)	DTXSID4059916
- InChI: InChI=1S/C4HF7O2/c5-2(6,1(12)13)3(7,8)4(9,10)11/h(H,12,13) Key: YPJUNDFVDDCYIH-UHFFFAOYSA-N; InChI=1/C4HF7O2/c5-2(6,1(12)13)3(7,8)4(9,10)11/h(H,12,13) Key: YPJUNDFVDDCYIH-UHFFFAOYAI
- SMILES: OC(C(F)(F)C(F)(F)C(F)(F)F)=O

Properties
Chemical formula	C_{4}HF_{7}O_{2}
Molar mass	214.039 g·mol^{−1}
Appearance	colourless liquid
Density	1.64 g/ml
Boiling point	120 °C (248 °F; 393 K)
Solubility in water	high

Hazards
- Occupational safety and health (OHS/OSH)
Main hazards	strong acid
- GHS labelling
Pictograms	(GHS05: Corrosive)
Signal word	Danger
Hazard statements	H314
Precautionary statements	P260, P280, P303+P361+P353, P304+P340+P310, P305+P351+P338
- Except where otherwise noted, data are given for materials in their standard state (at 25 °C [77 °F], 100 kPa). verify (what is ?) Infobox references

Perfluorobutanoic acid (PFBA) is a perfluoroalkyl carboxylic acid with the formula C_{3}F_{7}CO_{2}H. As the perfluorinated derivative of butyric acid, this colourless liquid is prepared by the sequential electrofluorination and hydrolysis of butyryl fluoride.

== Applications ==
PFBA has a variety of niche applications in analytical and synthetic chemistry. It is an ion pair reagent for reverse-phase high-performance liquid chromatography. It is used in the sequencing, synthesis, and solubilizing of proteins and peptides.

Esters derived from PFBA readily undergo condensation, owing to their electrophilicity. Specialized ligands for metal ions are generated capitalizing on this property, such as Eufod.

PFBA was formerly used for manufacturing photographic film. The 3M Company was a major manufacturer of PFBA and products containing PFBA but production was phased out in 1998.

Heptafluoropropyl iodide can be prepared by treating the silver salt of perfluorobutyric acid with iodine:

C_{3}F_{7}CO_{2}Ag + I_{2} → C_{3}F_{7}I + AgI + CO_{2}

== Environmental impact and regulation ==
PFBA is a breakdown product of other PFAS that have been used in stain-resistant fabrics, paper food packaging, carpets, and consumer products. PFBA has been frequently found in U.S. rivers.

In laboratory animal studies, exposure to high levels of PFBA results in thyroid and liver effects, such as increased thyroid and liver weight, changes in thyroid hormones, decreased cholesterol, and cellular changes in both organs. Other effects of PFBA exposure included delayed development and decreased red blood cells and hemoglobin.

The Minnesota Department of Health (MDH) developed a guidance value of 7 ppb (μg/L) for PFBA in drinking water.
