= Perfluorononanoic acid =

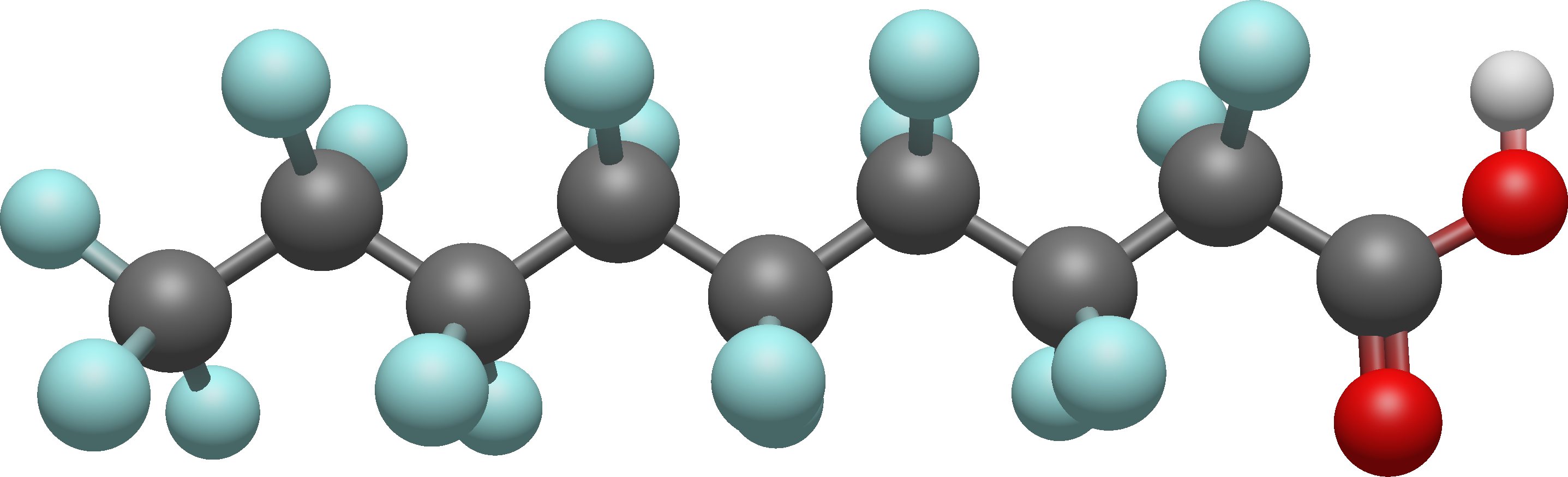

Names
- IUPAC name Heptadecafluorononanoic acid
- Other names perfluoro-n-nonanoic acid, PFNA, perfluorononanoate, C_{9} PFCA

Identifiers
CAS Number	375-95-1
3D model (JSmol)	Interactive image
Beilstein Reference	1897287
ChEBI	CHEBI:38397
ChEMBL	ChEMBL426404
ChemSpider	61138
ECHA InfoCard	100.006.184
EC Number	206-801-3
Gmelin Reference	317302
PubChem CID	67821
UNII	5830Z6S63M
CompTox Dashboard (EPA)	DTXSID8031863
- InChI: InChI=1S/C9HF17O2/c10-2(11,1(27)28)3(12,13)4(14,15)5(16,17)6(18,19)7(20,21)8(22,23)9(24,25)26/h(H,27,28) Key: UZUFPBIDKMEQEQ-UHFFFAOYSA-N
- SMILES: OC(=O)C(F)(F)C(F)(F)C(F)(F)C(F)(F)C(F)(F)C(F)(F)C(F)(F)C(F)(F)F

Properties
Chemical formula	C_{9}HF_{17}O_{2}
Molar mass	464.08 g/mol
Appearance	white crystalline powder
Melting point	59 to 62 °C (138 to 144 °F; 332 to 335 K)
Boiling point	218 °C (424 °F; 491 K)
Solubility in water	9.5 g/L
Solubility in other solvents	polar organic solvents
Acidity (pK_{a})	~0

Hazards
- Occupational safety and health (OHS/OSH)
Main hazards	Strong acid and suspected carcinogen
- GHS labelling
Pictograms	(GHS05: Corrosive) (GHS07: Exclamation mark) (GHS08: Health hazard)
Signal word	Danger
Hazard statements	H302, H318, H332, H351, H360, H362, H372
Precautionary statements	P201, P202, P260, P263, P264, P270, P271, P280, P281, P301+P312, P304+P312, P304+P340, P305+P351+P338, P308+P313, P310, P312, P314, P330, P405, P501

Related compounds
Related compounds	Trifluoroacetic acid (TFA), Perfluorooctanoic acid (PFOA), Perfluorooctanesulfonic acid (PFOS)
- Except where otherwise noted, data are given for materials in their standard state (at 25 °C [77 °F], 100 kPa). verify (what is ?) Infobox references

Perfluorononanoic acid, or PFNA, is an organofluorine compound with the formula CF_{3}(CF_{2})_{7}CO_{2}H. As the name implies it is the perfluorinated analogue of nonanoic acid, one of the perfluorinated carboxylic acids. As such, it is classified as a PFAS, a fluorosurfactant that has attracted attention as a persistent organic pollutant.

Being a strong acid, perfluorononanoic acid does not exist in aqueous media. Instead, its conjugate base, perfluorononanoate is the active component. Most aspects attributed to perfluorononanoic acid are due to this anion.

== Properties ==
In the commercial product Surflon S-111 (CAS 72968-3-88), ammonium perfluorononanoate, is used as surfactant for the production of the fluoropolymer polyvinylidene fluoride. It is produced mainly in Japan by the oxidation of a linear fluorotelomer olefin mixture containing F(CF_{2})_{8}CH=CH_{2}. It can also be synthesized by the carboxylation of F(CF_{2})_{8}I. PFNA can form from the biodegradation of 8:2 fluorotelomer alcohol. Additionally, it is considered a probable degradation product of many other compounds.

PFNA is the largest perfluorinated carboxylic acid surfactant produced commercially. Fluorocarbon derivatives with terminal carboxylates are only surfactants when they possess five to nine carbons. Fluorosurfactants lower the surface tension of water down to half of what hydrocarbon surfactants can by concentrating at the liquid-air interface due to the lipophobicity of fluorocarbons. PFNA is very stable and is not known to degrade in the environment by oxidative processes because of the strength of the carbon–fluorine bond.

== Environmental and health concerns ==
Like the eight-carbon PFOA, the nine-carbon PFNA is a suspected developmental toxicant and an immune system toxicant. However, longer chain perfluorinated carboxylic acids (PFCAs) are considered more bioaccumulative and toxic. PFNA is an agonist of the nuclear receptors PPARα and PPARγ. In the years between 1999–2000 and 2003–2004, the geometric mean of PFNA increased from 0.5 parts per billion to 1.0 parts per billion in the US population's blood serum. and has also been found in human follicular fluid In a cross-sectional study of 2003–2004 US samples, a higher (13.9 milligram per deciliter) total cholesterol level was observed in when the highest quartile was compared to the lowest. Non-HDL cholesterol (or "bad cholesterol") levels were also higher in samples with more PFNA.

In bottlenose dolphins from Delaware Bay, PFNA was the perfluorinated carboxylic acid measured in the highest concentration in blood plasma; it was found in concentrations well over 100 parts per billion. PFNA has been detected in polar bears in concentrations over 400 parts per billion. PFNA was the perfluorinated chemical measured in the highest concentration in Russian Baikal seals. However, PFOS is the perfluorinated compound that dominates in most wildlife biomonitoring samples.

=== Drinking water regulations ===
In the United States, PFNA is currently regulated only at the state level.

New Jersey became the first American state to set a standard for PFNA in September 2018, with a maximum contaminant level (MCL) of 13 ppt. This was soon followed by similar regulations for PFOA and PFOS.

Other states such as Massachusetts, Rhode Island, and Vermont have MCLs for the sum of several PFAS that all include PFNA.

In August 2020 the State of Michigan adopted drinking water standards for 5 previously unregulated PFAS compounds and lowered acceptable levels for 2 previously regulated compounds PFOS and PFOA to 16 ppt and 8 ppt respectively. PFNA has a MCL of 6 ppt.

On April 10, 2024, the U.S. Environmental Protection Agency (EPA) announced the final National Primary Drinking Water Regulation (NPDWR) establishing Maximum Contaminant Levels (MCLs) for six PFAS including PFNA. However, in May, 2025, EPA announced changes that would rescind the regulations for PFNA, PFHxS, HFPO-DA (commonly known as GenX), and PFBS.

The European Union regulates PFNA among a sum of many PFAS.

=== Food regulation ===
In 2020, the European Food Safety Authority added PFNA in its revised safety threshold for PFAS that accumulate in the body. They set the threshold for a group of four PFAS of a tolerable weekly intake of 4.4 nanograms per kilogram of body weight per week.

=== Product restrictions ===
In 2020, a California bill was passed banning PFNA as an intentionally added ingredient from cosmetics. In 2021, PFNA was restricted under REACH Regulation and in 2025, it was listed in Annex A of the Stockholm Convention on Persistent Organic Pollutants.
