= Perfluoroalkyl carboxylic acids =

Class of chemical compounds

Perfluorononanoic acid, an example of a perfluoroalkyl carboxylic acid (PFCA)

Perfluoroalkyl carboxylic acids (PFCAs), or perfluorocarboxylic acids are compounds of the formula C_{n}F_{(2n+1)}CO_{2}H that belong to the class of per- and polyfluoroalkyl substances. The simplest example is trifluoroacetic acid. These compounds are organofluorine analogues of ordinary carboxylic acids, but they are stronger by several pK_{a} units and they exhibit great hydrophobic character. Perfluoroalkyl dicarboxylic acids (PFdiCAs) are also known, e.g. C_{2}F_{4}(CO_{2}H)_{2}.

== Applications ==
Trifluoroacetic acid is a widely employed acid, used for example in the synthesis of peptides. Its esters are useful in analytical chemistry.

Longer-chain perfluoroalkyl carboxylic acids, e.g. with five to nine carbons, are useful fluorosurfactants and emulsifiers used in the production of polytetrafluoroethylene (Teflon) and related fluoropolymers.

== Production ==
These compounds are typically prepared by electrochemical fluorination of the carboxylic acid fluorides followed by hydrolysis:

C_{n}H_{(2n+1)}COF + (2n+1) HF → C_{n}F_{(2n+1)}COF + (2n+1) H_{2}
C_{n}F_{(2n+1)}COF + H_{2}O → C_{n}F_{(2n+1)}CO_{2}H + HF

Alternatively, perfluoroalkyl iodides can be oxidized using sulfur trioxide or chlorosulfonic acid. Such reactions proceed by formation of perfluoroalkylchlorosulfonates:

C_{n}F_{(2n+1)}CF_{2}I + HSO_{3}Cl → C_{n}F_{(2n+1)}CF_{2}OSO_{2}Cl + HI
C_{n}F_{(2n+1)}CF_{2}OSO_{2}Cl + 2 H2O → C_{n}F_{(2n+1)}CO_{2}H + 2 HF + H2SO4 + HCl

In yet another route, perfluoroalkyl iodide adds to ethylene to give the telomer:

2 C_{n}F_{2n+1}CH_{2}CH_{2}I + 11 [O] → 2 C_{‘’n’’}F_{2n+1}CO_{2}H + 2 CO_{2} + 3 H_{2}O + I_{2}

== Environmental concerns ==
Long-chain PFCAs such as perfluorooctanoic acid (PFOA) are either banned or under scrutiny because they are extremely persistent and bioaccumulative. In 2019, PFOA, its salts, and PFOA-related compounds were added to Annex A of the Stockholm Convention on Persistent Organic Pollutants, requiring treaty members to take measures to eliminate their production and use. In 2025, C_{9}–C_{21} long-chain PFCAs (C_{n}F_{2n+1}COOH, 8 ≤ n ≤ 20), their salts, and related compounds were added to Annex A.

Short-chain PFCAs (scPFCAs) are formed from atmospheric oxidation of fluorotelomer compounds and chlorofluorocarbon (CFC) replacements introduced as a result of the Montreal Protocol.

Side-chain fluorinated polymers (SCFPs), in which fluorotelomers are attached to a polymer backbone, may release fluorotelomer alcohols through hydrolysis. The latter are then degraded to PFCAs.

Simplified degradation pathway of urethane side-chain fluorinated polymers: hydrolysis yields fluorotelomer alcohols that are then degraded to PFCAs of different chain lengths (in the shown example PFHxA, PFHpA and PFBA).

== Common examples ==
Name	Abbreviation	Molecular formula	Molecular weight (g/mol)	CAS No.
Trifluoroacetic acid	TFA	CF_{3}COOH	114.02	76-05-1
Perfluoropropanoic acid	PFPrA	C_{2}F_{5}COOH	164.03	422-64-0
Perfluorobutanoic acid	PFBA	C_{3}F_{7}COOH	214.04	375-22-4
Perfluoropentanoic acid	PFPeA	C_{4}F_{9}COOH	264.05	2706-90-3
Perfluorohexanoic acid	PFHxA	C_{5}F_{11}COOH	314.05	307-24-4
Perfluoroheptanoic acid	PFHpA	C_{6}F_{13}COOH	364.06	375-85-9
Perfluorooctanoic acid	PFOA	C_{7}F_{15}COOH	414.07	335-67-1
Perfluorononanoic acid	PFNA	C_{8}F_{17}COOH	464.08	375-95-1
Perfluorodecanoic acid	PFDA	C_{9}F_{19}COOH	514.08	335-76-2
Perfluoroundecanoic acid	PFUnDA	C_{10}F_{21}COOH	564.09	2058-94-8
Perfluorododecanoic acid	PFDoDA	C_{11}F_{23}COOH	614.10	307-55-1
Perfluorotridecanoic acid	PFTrDA	C_{12}F_{25}COOH	664.10	72629-94-8
Perfluorotetradecanoic acid	PFTeDA	C_{13}F_{27}COOH	714.11	376-06-7

== See also ==
- Per- and polyfluoroalkyl substances
- Surflon S-111
