= Perfluoroalkyl iodide =

Perfluoroalkyl iodides are a class of substances in organofluorine chemistry. They are composed of a perfluoroalkyl chain and an iodine atom, i.e., C_{n}F_{2n+1}-I. They are widely used in the commercial syntheses of more elaborate organofluorine compounds include the per- and polyfluorinated alkyl compounds (PFAS). They are typically constructed from C_{2} units (pentafluoroethyl iodide and tetrafluoroethylene). They are used in the industrial production of fluorotelomers and in a wide range of applications in organic synthesis.

== Example compounds ==
Structural formula of perfluorooctyl iodide

Perfluoroalkyl iodides are known for two to more than 10 carbon atoms. They are colorless gases (C2), liquids (C3-C9), or solids (≥C10). Specific examples include pentafluoroethyl iodide, heptafluoropropyl iodide, nonafluorobutyl iodide, etc.

In contrast to these iodides, the perfluoroalkyl bromides and perfluoroalkyl chlorides are far less useful synthetically.

== Production ==
Fluorotelomers are derived from pentafluoroethyl iodide, which is converted to other perfluoroalkyl iodides by telomerization: CF_{3}CF_{2}I + n C_{2}F_{4} → CF_{3}CF_{2}(CF_{2}CF_{2})_n_I This process yields a mixture of longer-chain perfluoroalkyl iodides. The complete synthesis begins with the extraction of hydrogen fluoride (HF) from calcium fluoride. The reaction of HF with chloroform produces tetrafluoroethylene via chlorodifluoromethane. The addition of elemental iodine to tetrafluoroethylene and further reaction with iodine pentafluoride then produces pentafluoroethyl iodide via 1,1,2,2-tetrafluoro-1,2-diiodoethane, which, when extended with tetrafluoroethylene, yields various perfluoroalkyl iodides with straight chain lengths.

== Reactions ==
Perfluoroalkyl iodides are commonly employed in radical addition reactions to multiple bonds of alkynes and alkenes, enabling a broad range of synthetic transformations.

C_{n}F_{(2n+1)}I + CH_{2}=CH_{2} → C_{n}F_{(2n+1)}CH_{2}CH_{2}I

The resulting fluorotelomer iodides are versatile. A laboratory method for the addition of perfluoroalkyl iodides to alkenes and alkynes that provides good yields involves reacting an alkene or alkyne with a perfluoroalkyl iodide in the presence of a catalytic amount of triethylborane. Additions to terminal allenes and the introduction of perfluoroalkyl groups into unfunctionalized aromatics (benzene, naphthalene, xylenes, benzofuran) and fullerenes via an addition-elimination mechanism are also known.

Another well-studied class of reactions comprises coupling reactions of perfluoroalkyl iodides with aryl halides (primarily aryl bromides or aryl iodides, including derivatives of heteroaromatics). By reacting aromatic boronic acids with perfluoroalkyl iodides under copper catalysis, the boronic acid group can be replaced by a perfluoroalkyl residue. Upon reaction with an amine in tetrahydrofuran under UV radiation, perfluoroalkyl iodides generate perfluoroalkyl radicals that can be transferred to electron-rich aromatics and heteroaromatics.

Perfluoroalkyl iodides can also be converted into organometallic compounds, with Grignard compounds and organolithium compounds being particularly important. These intermediates can be used in standard reactions, including carboxylation with carbon dioxide and additions to aldehydes, ketones, and carboxylic acid esters. Organoboron compounds are obtained by reacting such organometallic compounds with boron trichloride or boron tribromide.

Hypervalent iodine compounds are obtained by reacting perfluoroalkyl iodides, such as perfluorobutyl iodide, with fluorinating agents, primarily chlorotrifluoride.

== Use ==
Perfluoroalkyl iodides are important intermediates in the production of fluorotelomer iodides, which in turn serve as precursors for fluorotelomer alcohols and other fluorotelomers.
