= Perfluoropropionic acid =

Names
- Other names pentafluoropropionic acid perfluoropropanoic acid PFPrA; C_{3} PFCA

Identifiers
CAS Number	422-64-0
3D model (JSmol)	Interactive image
ChemSpider	56147
ECHA InfoCard	100.006.384
EC Number	207-021-6
PubChem CID	62356
UNII	QB53AX6MW4
CompTox Dashboard (EPA)	DTXSID8059970
- InChI: InChI=1S/C3HF5O2/c4-2(5,1(9)10)3(6,7)8/h(H,9,10) Key: LRMSQVBRUNSOJL-UHFFFAOYSA-N
- SMILES: C(=O)(C(C(F)(F)F)(F)F)O

Properties
Chemical formula	C_{3}HF_{5}O_{2}
Molar mass	164.031 g·mol^{−1}
Appearance	colorless liquid
Density	1.561 g/mL
Boiling point	96–97 °C (205–207 °F; 369–370 K)
Acidity (pK_{a})	0.38±0.10

Hazards
- Occupational safety and health (OHS/OSH)
Main hazards	corrosive
- GHS labelling
Pictograms	(GHS05: Corrosive) (GHS07: Exclamation mark)
Signal word	Danger
Hazard statements	H314, H332
Precautionary statements	P280, P301+P330+P331, P305+P351+P338, P310
- Except where otherwise noted, data are given for materials in their standard state (at 25 °C [77 °F], 100 kPa). Infobox references

Perfluoropropionic acid (PFPrA) or pentafluoropropionic acid is an ultra-short chain perfluoroalkyl carboxylic acid with the formula CF_{3}CF_{2}CO_{2}H. It is a colorless liquid that is strongly acidic. It soluble in both water and polar organic solvents. The compound is produced by electrochemical fluorination of the carboxylic acid or its acid fluoride derivative.

It has a predicted pK_{a} of 0.38, with an uncertainty of 0.10. In many ways, it is comparable to trifluoroacetic acid.

== Occurrence and use ==
The perfluoropropanoate form has been found in environmental samples.

A convenient laboratory method for generating tetrafluoroethylene is the pyrolysis of the sodium salt of pentafluoropropionic acid:

C_{2}F_{5}CO_{2}Na → C_{2}F_{4} + CO_{2} + NaF
