= Telomerization (dimerization) =

The telomerization is the linear dimerization of 1,3-dienes with simultaneous addition of a nucleophile in a catalytic reaction.

== Reaction ==
The reaction was independently discovered by E. J. Smutny at Shell and Takahashi at the Osaka University in the late sixties. The general reaction equation is as follows:

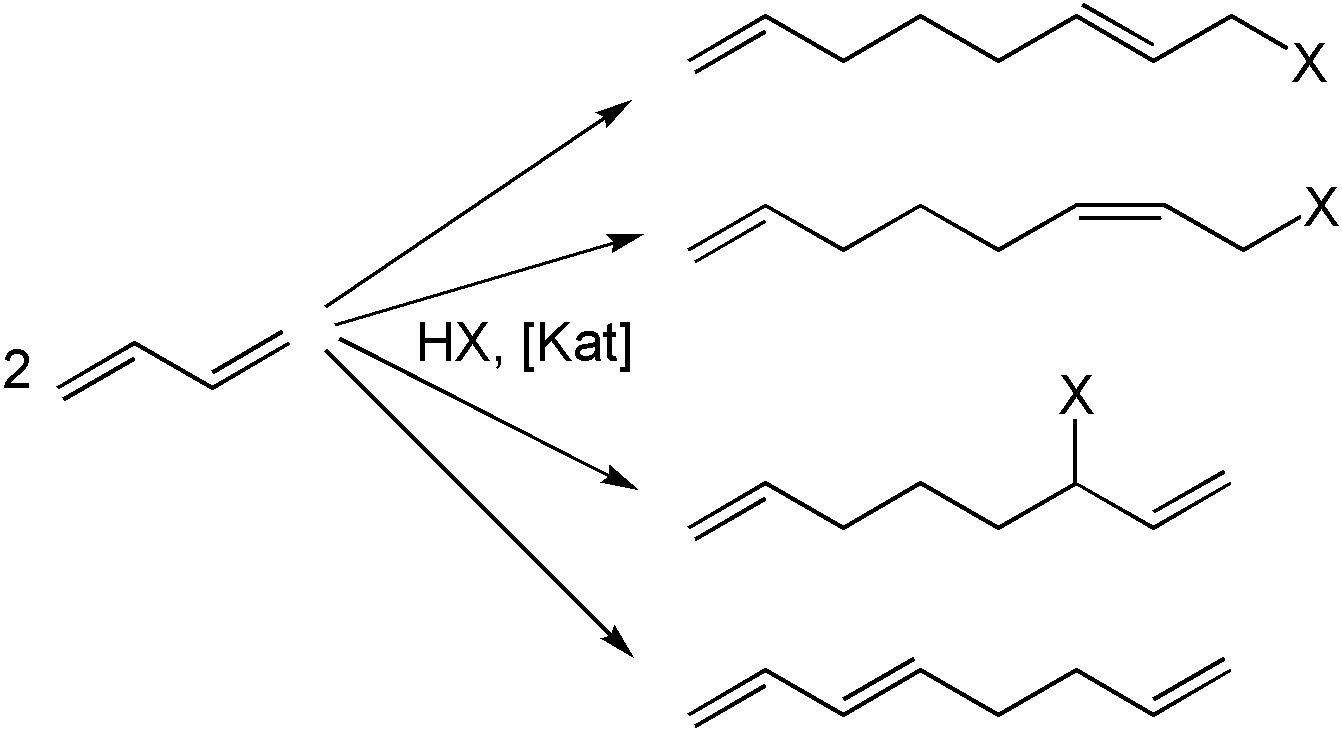
Products of the Telomerisation of 1,3-Butadiene

The formation of several isomers are possible. In addition to 1,3-butadiene also substituted dienes such as isoprene or cyclic dienes such as cyclopentadiene can be used. A variety of substances such as water, ammonia, alcohols, or C-H-acidic compounds can be used as nucleophiles. When water is used, for example di-unsaturated alcohols are obtained.

The catalysts used are mainly metal-organic palladium and nickel compounds. In 1991, Kuraray implemented the production of 1-octanol on an industrial scale (5000 t a(-1)).

The commercial route to produce 1-octene based on butadiene as developed by Dow Chemical came on stream in Tarragona in 2008. The telomerization of butadiene with methanol in the presence of a palladium catalyst yields 1-methoxy-2,7-octadiene, which is fully hydrogenated to 1-methoxyoctane in the next step. Subsequent cracking of 1-methoxyoctane gives 1-octene and methanol for recycle.

== Mechanism ==
While the reaction is catalyzed by Pd(0) complexes, the pre-catalyst can also be a Pd(II) compound that is reduced in situ. Once the Pd(0) catalyst is formed it can coordinate two butadienes which by oxidative coupling give the intermediate B. Even though the oxidative coupling is facile it is nonetheless reversible; the latter is illustrated by the fact that B is only stable at high butadiene concentration. Subsequent protonation of this intermediate by NuH at the 6-position of the η^{3}-,η^{1}-octadienyl ligand leads to intermediate C. Nw direct attack of the nucleophile can take place at either the 1- or 3-position of the η^{3}-octadienyl chain, which leads to the linear or branched product complexes D_{n} and D_{iso} respectively. Upon displacement by new 1,3-butadiene the product telomer is liberated while the catalyst is regenerated and can continue the cycle.

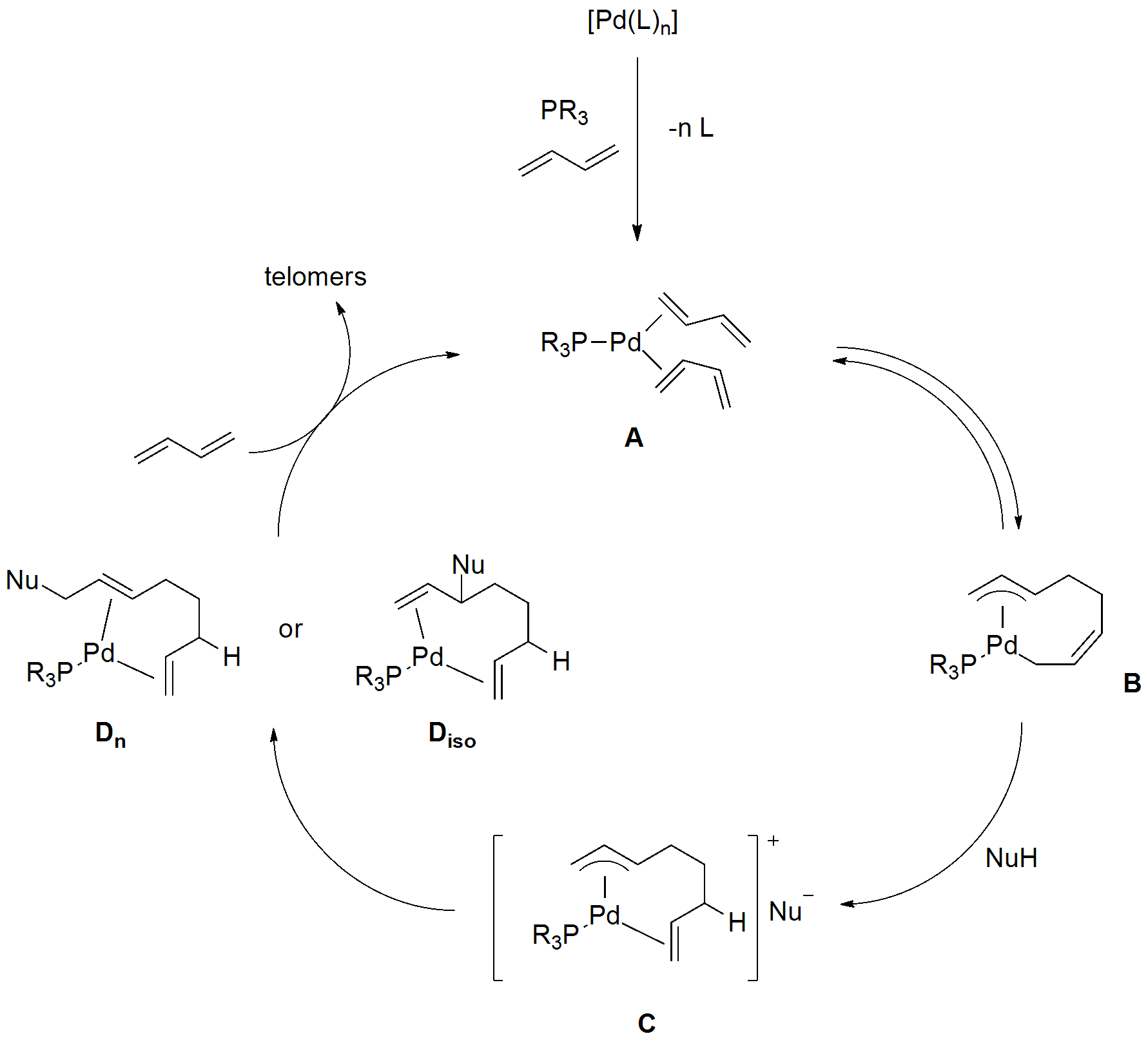
Catalytic cycle of the Palladium/Phosphine-catalyzed telomerization of 1,3-butadiene with a nucleophile NuH

While from purely steric reasons nucleophilic attack at the less substituted side of the allyl is favored, the regioselectivity of nucleophilic attack can heavily depend on the exact nature of ligands positioned trans to the allyl group.

== Literature ==
- P. Fischer: process concepts for the transition-telomerization of isoprene with water or methanol. Shaker Verlag, 2002, 176 pages, ISBN 3-8322-0414-8, ISBN 978-3-8322-0414-3
- Arno Behr, Marc Becker, Thomas Beckmann, Leif Johnen, Julia Leschinski, Sebastian Reyer: Telomerization: Advances and Applications of a Versatile Reaction. In: Angewandte Chemie International Edition. 48, 2009, p. 3598–3614, doi:10.1002/anie.200804599.
- M.J.-L. Tschan, E.J. Garcıa-Suarez, Z. Freixa, H. Launay, H. Hagen, J. Benet-Buchholz, P.W.N.M. van Leeuwen, J. Am. Chem. Soc. 2010, 132, 6463-6473.

== See also ==
- Telomerization
