= Valerophenone =

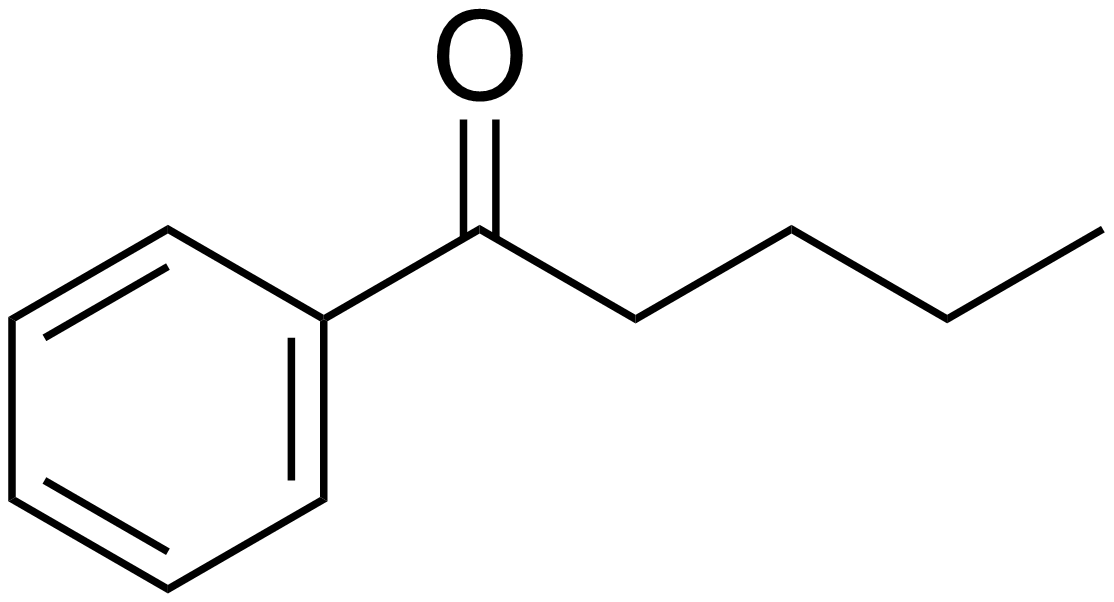

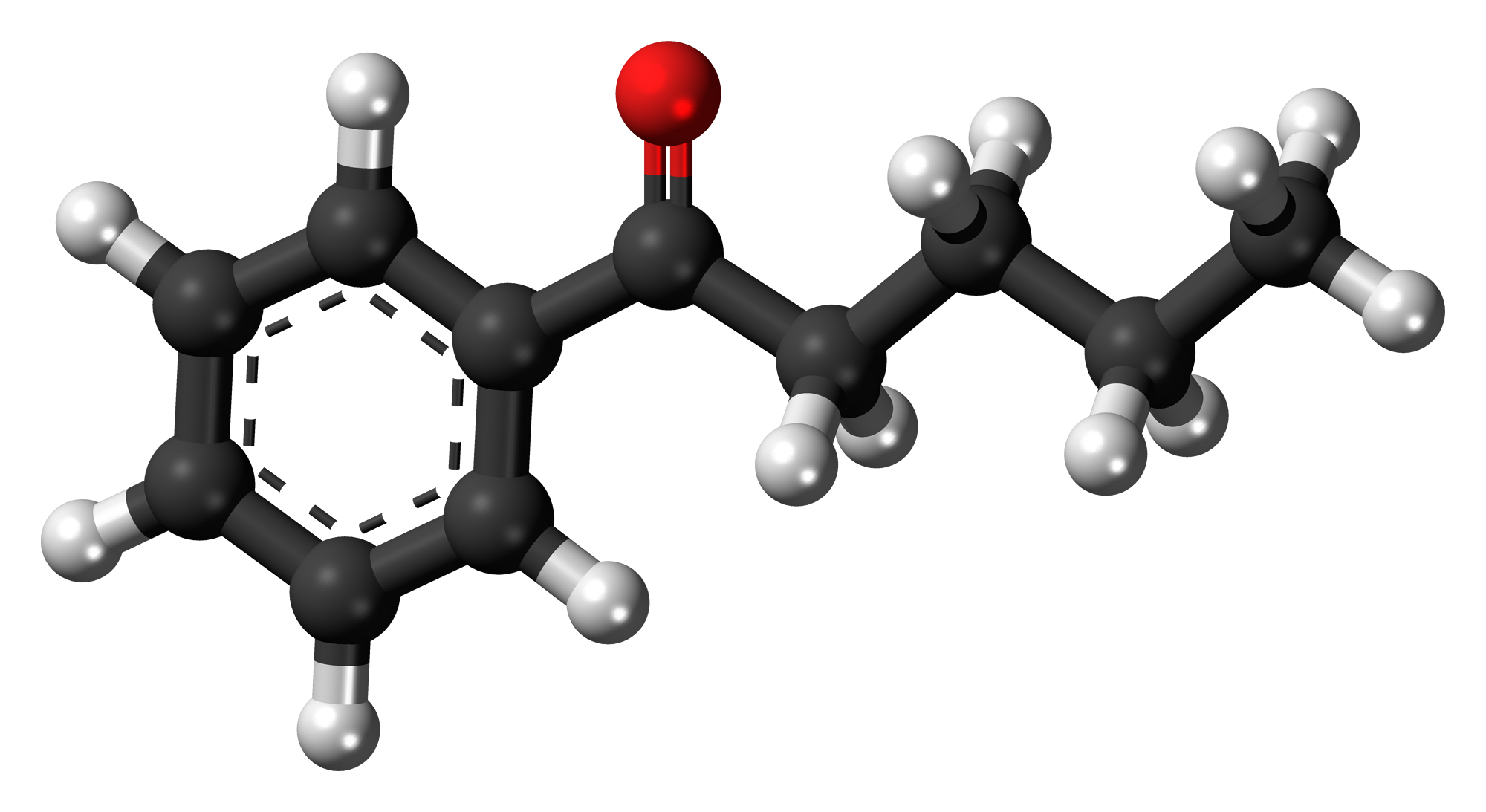

Names
- Preferred IUPAC name 1-Phenylpentan-1-one
- Other names 1-Phenyl-1-pentanone; Valerophenone; Butyl phenyl ketone n-Butyl phenyl ketone

Identifiers
CAS Number	1009-14-9
3D model (JSmol)	Interactive image
ChEBI	CHEBI:36812
ChEMBL	ChEMBL372105
ChemSpider	59482
ECHA InfoCard	100.012.516
PubChem CID	66093
UNII	F27Q043NT1
CompTox Dashboard (EPA)	DTXSID0061406
- InChI: InChI=1S/C11H14O/c1-2-3-9-11(12)10-7-5-4-6-8-10/h4-8H,2-3,9H2,1H3 Key: XKGLSKVNOSHTAD-UHFFFAOYSA-N; InChI=1/C11H14O/c1-2-3-9-11(12)10-7-5-4-6-8-10/h4-8H,2-3,9H2,1H3 Key: XKGLSKVNOSHTAD-UHFFFAOYAK
- SMILES: O=C(c1ccccc1)CCCC

Properties
Chemical formula	C_{11}H_{14}O
Molar mass	162.23 g/mol
Density	0.988 g/cm^{3}
Melting point	−9.4 °C (15.1 °F; 263.8 K)
Boiling point	105 to 107 °C (221 to 225 °F; 378 to 380 K) at 5 mmHg

Hazards
NFPA 704 (fire diamond)	2 1
Safety data sheet (SDS)	External MSDS
- Except where otherwise noted, data are given for materials in their standard state (at 25 °C [77 °F], 100 kPa). verify (what is ?) Infobox references

Valerophenone, or butyl phenyl ketone, is an aromatic ketone with the formula C_{6}H_{5}C(O)C_{4}H_{9}. It is a colorless liquid that is soluble in organic solvents. It is usually prepared by the acylation of benzene using valeryl chloride.

== Selected reactions ==
Being prochiral, valerophenone undergoes enantioselective hydrogenation to the corresponding alcohol.

Its photochemistry has been studied.

Valerophenone is also an inhibitor of the enzyme carbonyl reductase.

== See also ==
- Acetophenone
- Butyrophenone
- Propiophenone
