= Fluorotelomer alcohol =

Long chain molecule

8:2 fluorotelomer alcohol (8:2 FTOH)

Fluorotelomer alcohols, or FTOHs, are fluorotelomers with an alcohol functional group. They are volatile precursors to perfluorinated carboxylic acids, such as PFOA and PFNA, and other compounds.

== Naming ==
Commonly, an individual fluorotelomer alcohol molecule is named by the number of carbons that are fluorinated versus the number that are hydrocarbon-based. For example, 8:2 fluorotelomer alcohol would represent a molecule with 8 fluorinated carbons and a 2 carbon ethyl alcohol group. The structure of a fluorotelomer alcohol is most commonly F(CF_{2})_{n}CH_{2}CH_{2}OH, where n is an even number.

== Chemistry ==
The synthesis of fluorotelomer alcohols requires a varying number of tetrafluoroethylene monomers that form an oligomer with a pentafluoroethyl iodide telogen. The fluorinated iodide then undergoes an addition with ethylene to form an organoiodine compound with increased synthesis possibilities. The terminal iodine is replaced by a hydroxyl group to yield the fluorotelomer alcohol. The fluorotelomer alcohol can then be used to produce acrylate polymers with the fluorotelomer alcohols attached via ester functional groups.

== Environmental and health concerns ==
Fluorotelomer alcohols are volatile and widely detected in air.

Acrylate polymers with fluorotelomer substituents are under investigation for their potential to degrade into environmental contaminants." The USEPA has carried out environmental degradation studies with two DuPont acrylate polymers in four soils and water. These studies reported environmental degradation half-life ranges for these commercial fluorotelomer-based polymers of 33 to 112 years. FTOHs can also be used as intermediates in the production of surfactants.

Fluorotelomer alcohols can biodegrade to perfluorinated carboxylic acids, which persist in the environment and are found in the blood serum of populations and wildlife, such as the toxic PFOA and PFNA.

Aerobic biotransformation pathways of 8:2 FTOH in soil

The fluorotelomer alcohols 6:2 FTOH and 8:2 FTOH have been found to be estrogenic.

10:2 fluorotelomer alcohol (10:2 FTOH)

The atmospheric oxidation of fluorotelomer alcohols can also result in anthropogenic perfluorinated carboxylic acids. In addition to perfluorinated carboxylic acids, fluorotelomer alcohols can degrade to form unsaturated carboxylic acids which have been detected in bottlenose dolphins. Fluorotelomer alcohols such as 4:2 FTOH, 6:2 FTOH, 8:2 FTOH, and 10:2 FTOH, have been identified as residuals in consumer products such as stain repellents, Zonyl FSE, and windshield wash, among others. The United States Environmental Protection Agency has asked eight chemical companies to reduce the amount of residuals, including fluorotelomer alcohols, from products.
