= Heptafluoropropyl iodide =

Identifiers
CAS Number	754-34-7; 677-69-0 isopropyl derivative

Properties
Chemical formula	C_{3}F_{7}I
Molar mass	295.926 g·mol^{−1}
Appearance	colorless liquid
Density	2.05 g/mL
Melting point	−95 °C (−139 °F; 178 K)
Boiling point	41 °C (106 °F; 314 K)
- Except where otherwise noted, data are given for materials in their standard state (at 25 °C [77 °F], 100 kPa). Infobox references

Heptafluoropropyl iodide refers to the organofluorine compound with the formula C_{3}F_{7}I. It consists of a perfluoroalkyl group terminated by iodide, i.e. a perfluoroalkyl iodide. A colorless volatile liquid, the compound has attracted attention as a precursor to fluorotelomers and related surfactants. In addition to their utility, such compounds are controversial as members PFAS, related to "forever chemicals".

It can be prepared by treating the silver salt of perfluorobutyric acid with iodine:

C_{3}F_{7}CO_{2}Ag + I_{2} → C_{3}F_{7}I + AgI + CO_{2}
