= Hexanoyl chloride =

Names
- Preferred IUPAC name Hexanoyl chloride
- Other names Caproyl chloride

Identifiers
CAS Number	142-61-0
3D model (JSmol)	Interactive image
ChemSpider	60671
ECHA InfoCard	100.005.045
EC Number	205-549-1
PubChem CID	67340
UNII	I7GE8HG3B2
CompTox Dashboard (EPA)	DTXSID8059718
- InChI: InChI=1S/C6H11ClO/c1-2-3-4-5-6(7)8/h2-5H2,1H3 Key: YWGHUJQYGPDNKT-UHFFFAOYSA-N
- SMILES: CCCCCC(=O)Cl

Properties
Chemical formula	C_{6}H_{11}ClO
Molar mass	134.60 g·mol^{−1}

Hazards
- Occupational safety and health (OHS/OSH)
Main hazards	Maybe toxic and corrosive
- GHS labelling
Pictograms	(GHS02: Flammable) (GHS05: Corrosive) (GHS07: Exclamation mark)
Signal word	Danger
Hazard statements	H226, H302, H314, H335
Precautionary statements	P210, P233, P240, P241, P242, P243, P260, P264, P270, P271, P280, P301+P312, P301+P330+P331, P303+P361+P353, P304+P340, P305+P351+P338, P310, P312, P321, P330, P363, P370+P378, P403+P233, P403+P235, P405, P501
- Except where otherwise noted, data are given for materials in their standard state (at 25 °C [77 °F], 100 kPa). Infobox references

Hexanoyl chloride is a six-carbon acyl chloride with a straight-chain structure that is used as a reagent in organic synthesis.

== Structure and properties ==
Hexanoyl chloride consists of a six-carbon aliphatic chain attached to an acyl chloride functional group (–COCl). Like other acyl chlorides, it is highly electrophilic and readily undergoes nucleophilic acyl substitution reactions.

The compound is typically a colorless to pale yellow liquid with a pungent odor. It is moisture-sensitive and hydrolyzes rapidly in the presence of water to produce hexanoic acid and hydrogen chloride:

CH3(CH2)4COCl + H2O → CH3(CH2)4COOH + HCl

== Preparation ==
Hexanoyl chloride is commonly prepared by the reaction of hexanoic acid with chlorinating agents such as:

- Thionyl chloride (SOCl_{2})
- Phosphorus pentachloride (PCl_{5})
- Oxalyl chloride ((COCl)_{2})

A typical synthesis using thionyl chloride is:

CH3(CH2)4COOH + SOCl2 → CH3(CH2)4COCl + SO2 + HCl

== Reactions ==
Hexanoyl chloride participates in many reactions characteristic of acyl chlorides:

=== Ester formation ===
Reaction with alcohols yields hexanoate esters:

R-OH + CH3(CH2)4COCl → CH3(CH2)4COOR + HCl

=== Amide formation ===
Reaction with ammonia or amines produces amides:

RNH2 + CH3(CH2)4COCl → CH3(CH2)4CONHR + HCl

=== Friedel–Crafts acylation ===
In the presence of a Lewis acid catalyst such as aluminium chloride, hexanoyl chloride can acylate aromatic compounds to form ketones.

== Uses ==
Hexanoyl chloride is used in:

- Organic synthesis laboratories as an acylating reagent.
- Manufacture of pharmaceuticals and agrochemicals.
- Production of specialty esters and amides.
- Preparation of surfactants, fragrances, and fine chemicals.

== Safety ==
Hexanoyl chloride is corrosive and reacts vigorously with water, releasing hydrogen chloride gas. Contact with skin, eyes, or mucous membranes may cause severe irritation or burns. Appropriate protective equipment should be used when handling the substance.

== See also ==
- Acyl chloride
- Hexanoic acid
- Butanoyl chloride
- Octanoyl chloride
