= Joseph H. Simons =

American chemist

- Born: 10 May 1897; Chicago
- Died: 30 December 1983 (aged 86); Gainesville, FL
- Citizenship: United States
- Education: University of Illinois; University of California
- Known for: discovering electrochemical fluorination for mass production of fluorocarbons
- Scientific career
- Fields: Organofluorine chemistry
- Workplaces: Pennsylvania State University

Joseph H. Simons (10 May 1897 – 30 December 1983) was a U.S. chemist who became famous for discovering one of the first practical ways to mass-produce fluorocarbons in the 1930s while a professor of chemical engineering at Pennsylvania State University. In 1950, he and other employees of 3M received a patent for the procedure of electrochemical fluorination.

== Early life and education ==
Joseph H. Simons was born on 10 May 1897 in Chicago. He studied chemistry at the University of Illinois. After graduation in 1919 he continued chemistry and mathematics at the University of California, where in 1922, he received a master's degree and in 1923 a doctorate.

== Career ==
He returned to the Midwest and became a professor of chemical engineering at Pennsylvania State College, now Pennsylvania State University. In the late 1930s he passed fluorine gas through a carbon arc creating fluorocarbon. Results were published in 1938.

In 1940, he was recruited to the Manhattan Project by Harold Urey, a physical chemist with expertise in isotope separation, to help with uranium enrichment necessary to build a nuclear bomb. Simons's fluorocarbons turned out to be inert enough to withstand the corrosive effects of uranium hexafluoride and thus could be used as factory parts in the chemical array of sealants, gaskets or pipes, for example.

Simons invented a method for the large-scale, industrial production of fluorocarbons. In September 1948, he presented a series of papers at a Fluorocarbon Symposium by the American Chemical Society. On 29 November 1948 he filed an application to patent the electrochemical process of making fluorine-containing carbon compounds with two others from the Minnesota Mining & Manufacturing Company, St. Paul, Minnesota, which he received on 22 August 1950. On 4 September 1951 he also received a patent for "Fluorocarbon acids and derivatives".

In 1950 he left for the University of Florida, Gainesville, and by 1952, he was affiliated with the 3M sponsored "Fluorine Laboratories, State College, Pennsylvania" and the "Fluorine Research Center" at the University of Florida, Gainesville. It was there in 1954, when the first unclassified technical report on the preparation of Fluorine containing compounds was written for the Office of Naval Research.

He retired in 1967.

== Personal life ==
Simons was married to Eleanor May Simons and at the time of his death was survived by a daughter, Dorothy Lanning of Spencerville, Md., and a son, Robert W. Simons, of Gainesville.

== Work and legacy ==
Simons is credited with discovering electrochemical fluorination, and the procedure was named "Simons process" after him.

=== Publications ===
- Joseph H. Simons and L.P. Block. 1937. Journal of the American Chemical Society 59: 1407.
- Simons J. H. and Block L. P. (1939) Fluorocarbons. J. Am.Chem. Soc.61, 2962–2966, doi:10.1021/ja01265a111
- Joseph H. Simons. 1972. A Pioneering Trip in Fluorine Chemistry. The Chemist. February 1972.
- Simons, J. H. (1950). Fluorine chemistry. New York: Academic Press. OCLC 883707.
- Joseph H. Simons. 1986. The Seven Ages of Fluorine Chemistry. Address presented 19 July 1973 Santa Cruz, CA on receipt of award for "Creative Work in Fluorine Chemistry." Journal of Fluorine Chemistry, 32(1): 7-24.

He also published under a pen name Paul P. Plexus:

- Paul P. Plexus. 1957. Realism. New York: Vantage Press.
- Paul P. Plexus. 1960. A Structure of Science. New York: Philosophical Library.
- Paul P. Plexus. 1971. Gebo: Successor to Man. New York: Manyland Books.

=== Awards ===
- Chemical Pioneer Award, American Institute of Chemists, 1971
- American Chemical Society Award for Creative Work in Fluorine Chemistry, 1973

== See also ==
- Ralph Landau, chemist, designed equipment to produce fluorine at Oak Ridge National Laboratory
- Roy J. Plunkett, chemist, discoverer of Teflon at DuPont
