= Fluorotelomer =

Fluorinated oligomer of limited size produced by radical polymerization reaction

Fluorotelomers are fluorocarbon-based oligomers, or telomers, synthesized by telomerization. Some fluorotelomers and fluorotelomer-based compounds are a source of environmentally persistent perfluorinated carboxylic acids such as PFOA and PFNA, while others are under extended investigation.

== Types ==
There are many broad categories of fluorotelomers:

- Fluorotelomer alcohols (FTOH)
- Fluorotelomer ethoxylates (FTEO)
- Fluorotelomer fumarates
- Fluorotelomer methacrylates (FTMAC)
- Fluorotelomer sulphonates (FTS)

== Production ==
The overall process entails a chain-building stage starting with pentafluoroethyl iodide, followed by coupling of an extended fluorocarbon to various functional groups. Pentafluoroethyl iodide undergoes telomerization with tetrafluoroethylene:

CF_{3}CF_{2}I + n C_{2}F_{4} → CF_{3}CF_{2}(C_{2}F_{4})_{n}I

The reactions convert a simple perfluoroalkyl iodide to a heavier oligomer.

Next, the extended perfluoroalkyl iodide reacts with ethylene to give the fluorotelomer iodide:

CF_{3}CF_{2}(C_{2}F_{4})_{n}I + C_{2}H_{4} → CF_{3}CF_{2}(C_{2}F_{4})_{n}CH_{2}CH_{2}I

Both steps proceed by free-radical pathways; the ethylene addition is an example of atom-transfer radical addition (ATRA). The iodide is then converted to the alcohol, often via the intermediacy of a sulfate ester:

CF_{3}CF_{2}(C_{2}F_{4})_{n}CH_{2}CH_{2}I + H_{2}O → CF_{3}CF_{2}(C_{2}F_{4})_{n}CH_{2}CH_{2}OH + HI

The products are of various chain lengths (n), the n value determining hydrophobicity.

From this alcohol, acrylate esters and methacrylates are made. Polymers derived from fluorotelomers represent more than 80% of the global manufacture and use of fluorotelomer-based products.

General (simplified) synthesis route of fluorotelomer-based urethane side-chain fluorinated polymers (SCFPs)

== Applications ==
Fluorotelomers are used in fire-fighting foams, grease-resistant food packaging, leather protectants and stain-resistant carpeting, textiles, anti-fogging sprays and wipes. Fluorotelomers are applied to food contact papers for their oleophobicity, making paper resistant to absorbing oil from fatty foods. Fluorotelomer coatings are used in microwave popcorn bags, fast food wrappers, candy wrappers, and pizza box liners.

== Environmental and health concerns ==
Fluorotelomers are of interest as environmental contaminants.

== Industry and government actions ==
In 2002 Burger King stopped using fluorotelomer coated boxes.

After more than a year of negotiating with "telomer makers Asahi Glass, Clariant, Daikin America, and DuPont to perform degradation studies on 13 of their products", the U.S. Environmental Protection Agency (USEPA) and companies were not able to agree on terms. Thus, in late June 2004 the USEPA announced it would perform the degradation studies itself, with an expected time to complete the studies of 1 year. However, in a December 2005 deal with the USEPA over alleged withholdings, DuPont agreed to test nine of its fluorotelomer-based products' potential to break down into PFOA by 27 December 2008. Yet, in late December 2008, the USEPA and DuPont filed a joint motion stating that DuPont needed additional time to purify the products. USEPA lawyers extended the deadline by three years, to 27 December 2011, in the last month of the Bush administration.

In 2009 a 546-day USEPA study was published that estimated a degradation half-life for a fluorotelomer-based polymer in the range of 10–17 years. This estimate was much shorter than the half-life estimated by a DuPont study. Given this discrepancy, the USEPA undertook an extensive effort to develop methods for testing the degradation rate of commercial fluorotelomer-based polymers. The USEPA then carried out studies with two DuPont polymers in four soils and water using these methods. These new studies reported half-life ranges for these commercial fluorotelomer-based polymers of 33 to 112 years.
