= Telomere resolvase =

Enzyme found in bacteria

Telomere resolvase, also known as protelomerase, is an enzyme found in bacteria which contain linear plasmids.

== Function ==
In order to prevent exonuclease degradation of their chromosomes, bacterial linear plasmids contain hairpin turns at the ends. During DNA replication, a replication bubble forms in the linear plasmid and expands until a circular plasmid-like structure is formed. Telomere resolvase then cuts the structure and reforms the hairpin turns, forming two new, identical linear plasmids.
