= Octanoyl chloride =

Names
- Preferred IUPAC name Octanoyl chloride
- Other names Capryloyl chloride; n-Octanoyl chloride; Caprylic acid chloride

Identifiers
CAS Number	111-64-8
3D model (JSmol)	Interactive image
ChEMBL	ChEMBL1504663
ChemSpider	7832
ECHA InfoCard	100.003.538
EC Number	203-891-6
PubChem CID	8124
UNII	BK8FUS6OVT
UN number	1760
CompTox Dashboard (EPA)	DTXSID9024724
- InChI: InChI=1S/C8H15ClO/c1-2-3-4-5-6-7-8(9)10/h2-7H2,1H3 Key: REEZZSHJLXOIHL-UHFFFAOYSA-N
- SMILES: CCCCCCCC(=O)Cl

Properties
Chemical formula	C_{8}H_{15}ClO
Molar mass	162.66 g·mol^{−1}

Hazards
- GHS labelling
Pictograms	(GHS05: Corrosive) (GHS06: Toxic) (GHS07: Exclamation mark)
Signal word	Danger
Hazard statements	H290, H315, H317, H318, H330
Precautionary statements	P234, P260, P264, P264+P265, P271, P272, P280, P284, P302+P352, P304+P340, P305+P354+P338, P316, P317, P320, P321, P333+P317, P362+P364, P390, P403+P233, P405, P501
- Except where otherwise noted, data are given for materials in their standard state (at 25 °C [77 °F], 100 kPa). Infobox references

Octanoyl chloride is an eight-carbon acyl chloride with a straight-chain structure that is used as a reagent in organic synthesis.
