= Telomerization =

Chemical reaction producing oligomers with two distinct end groups

Telomerization is a reaction that produces a particular kind of oligomer with two distinct end groups. The oligomer is called a telomer. Some telomerizations proceed by radical pathways, many do not. A generic equation is:

A−B + nM → A−M_{n}−B

where M is the monomer, and A and B are the end groups, and n is the degree of polymerization.

One example is the coupled dimerization and hydroesterification of buta-1,3-diene. This step produces a doubly unsaturated C9-ester:

2 CH_{2}=CH-CH=CH_{2} + CO + CH_{3}OH → CH_{2}=CH(CH_{2})_{3}CH=CHCH_{2}CO_{2}CH_{3}

The monomer in this reaction is butadiene, the degree of polymerization is 2, and the end groups are vinyl and the carboxy methyl (CO_{2}CH_{3}). This and several related reactions proceed with palladium catalysts. Many telomerizations are used in industrial chemistry.

== Nomenclature ==
According to the terminology used in polymer chemistry, telomerization requires a telogen to react with at least one unsaturated taxogen molecule. Fluorotelomers are an example.

== See also ==
- Perfluorooctanoic acid (synthesis)
- Telomerization (dimerization)
