= Lipophobicity =

Chemical property

Lipophobicity, also sometimes called lipophobia (from the Greek λιποφοβία from λίπος lipos "fat" and φόβος phobos "fear"), is a chemical property of chemical compounds which means "fat rejection", literally "fear of fat". Lipophobic compounds are those not soluble in lipids or other non-polar solvents. From the other point of view, they do not absorb fats.

"Oleophobic" (from the Latin oleum "oil", Greek ελαιοφοβικό eleophobico from έλαιο eleo "oil" and φόβος phobos "fear") refers to the physical property of a molecule that is seemingly repelled from oil. (Strictly speaking, there is no repulsive force involved; it is an absence of attraction.)

The most common lipophobic substance is water.

Fluorocarbons are also lipophobic/oleophobic in addition to being hydrophobic.

== Uses ==
A lipophobic coating has been used on the touchscreens of Apple's iPhones since the 3GS, their iPads, Nokia's N9 and Lumia devices, the HTC HD2, the Blackberry DTEK50, Hero, and Flyer and many other phones to repel fingerprint oil, which aids in preventing and cleaning fingerprint marks. Most "oleophobic" coatings used on mobile devices are fluoropolymer-based solids (similar to Teflon, which was used on the HTC Hero) and are both lipophobic and hydrophobic. The oleophobic coating beads up the oils left behind by a user's fingers, making it easy to clean without smearing and smudging. This helps decrease the feasibility of a successful smudge attack. In addition to being lipophobic or oleophobic, perfluoropolyether coatings impart exceptional lubricity to touch screens and give them a "slick feel" that eases their use.

DIY products exist to restore or add an oleophobic coating to devices lacking one.

== See also ==
- Lipophilicity
- Hydrophobicity
