= Electrochemical fluorination =

Organofluorine chemistry method

Electrochemical fluorination (ECF), or electrofluorination, is a foundational organofluorine chemistry method for the preparation of fluorocarbon-based organofluorine compounds. The general approach represents an application of electrosynthesis. The fluorinated chemical compounds produced by ECF are useful because of their distinctive solvation properties and the relative inertness of carbon–fluorine bonds. Two ECF synthesis routes are commercialized and commonly applied: the Simons process and the Phillips Petroleum process. It is also possible to electrofluorinate in various organic media. Prior to the development of these methods, fluorination with fluorine, a dangerous oxidizing agent, was a dangerous and wasteful process. ECF can be cost-effective, but it may also result in low yields.

== Simons process ==
The Simons process, named after Joseph H. Simons entails electrolysis of a solution of an organic compound in a solution of hydrogen fluoride. An individual reaction can be described as:

R_{3}C–H + HF → R_{3}C–F + H_{2}

In the course of a typical synthesis, this reaction occurs once for each C–H bond in the precursor. The cell potential is maintained near 5–6 V. The anode is nickel-plated. Simons discovered the process in the 1930s at Pennsylvania State College (U.S.), under the sponsorship of the 3M Corporation. The results were not published until after World War II because the work was classified due to its relevance to the manufacture of uranium hexafluoride.

In 1949 Simons and his coworkers published a long paper in the Journal of the Electrochemical Society.

The Simons process is used for the production of perfluorinated amines, ethers, carboxylic acids, and sulfonic acids. For carboxylic and sulfonic acids, the products are the corresponding acyl fluorides and sulfonyl fluorides. The method has been adapted to laboratory-scale preparations. Two noteworthy considerations are (i) the hazards associated with hydrogen fluoride (the solvent and fluorine source) and (ii) the requirement for anhydrous conditions.

== Phillips Petroleum process ==
This method is similar to the Simons Process but is typically applied to the preparation from volatile hydrocarbons and chlorohydrocarbons. In this process, electrofluorination is conducted at porous graphite anodes in molten potassium fluoride in hydrogen fluoride. The species KHF_{2} is relatively low melting, a good electrolyte, and an effective source of fluorine. The technology is sometimes called “CAVE” for Carbon Anode Vapor Phase Electrochemical Fluorination and was widely used at manufacturing sites of the 3M Corporation. The organic compound is fed through a porous anode leading to exchange of fluorine for hydrogen but not chlorine.

== Other methods ==
ECF has also been conducted in organic media, using for example organic salts of fluoride and acetonitrile as the solvent. A typical fluoride source is (C_{2}H_{5})_{3}N:3HF. In some cases, acetonitrile is omitted, and the solvent and electrolyte are the triethylamine-HF mixture. Representative products of this method are fluorobenzene (from benzene) and 1,2-difluoroalkanes (from alkenes).
