= Dark Waters (2019 film) =

2019 American film by Todd Haynes

- Theatrical release poster
- Directed by: Todd Haynes
- Screenplay by: Mario Correa; Matthew Michael Carnahan
- Based on: "The Lawyer Who Became DuPont's Worst Nightmare" (2016) by Nathaniel Rich
- Produced by: Mark Ruffalo; Christine Vachon; Pamela Koffler
- Starring: Mark Ruffalo; Anne Hathaway; Tim Robbins; Bill Camp; Victor Garber; Mare Winningham; Bill Pullman
- Cinematography: Edward Lachman
- Edited by: Affonso Gonçalves
- Music by: Marcelo Zarvos
- Production companies: Participant; Killer Content; Willi Hill
- Distributed by: Focus Features
- Release dates: November 12, 2019 (Walter Reade Theater); November 22, 2019 (United States)
- Running time: 126 minutes
- Country: United States
- Language: English
- Box office: $23.1 million

Dark Waters is a 2019 American legal thriller film directed by Todd Haynes and written by Mario Correa and Matthew Michael Carnahan. The story dramatizes Robert Bilott's case against the chemical manufacturing corporation DuPont after they contaminated a town with unregulated chemicals. It stars Mark Ruffalo as Bilott, along with Anne Hathaway, Tim Robbins, Bill Camp, Victor Garber, Mare Winningham, William Jackson Harper, and Bill Pullman.

The film is based on the 2016 New York Times Magazine article "The Lawyer Who Became DuPont's Worst Nightmare" by Nathaniel Rich. An account of the investigation and case was first publicized in the book Stain-Resistant, Nonstick, Waterproof and Lethal: The Hidden Dangers of C8 (2007) by Callie Lyons, a Mid-Ohio Valley journalist who covered the controversy as it was unfolding. Parts of the pollution and coverup story were also reported by Mariah Blake, whose 2015 article "Welcome to Beautiful Parkersburg, West Virginia" was a National Magazine Award finalist, and Sharon Lerner, whose series "Bad Chemistry" ran in The Intercept. Bilott wrote his own memoir, Exposure (2019), detailing his 20-year legal battle against DuPont.

Focus Features gave Dark Waters a limited theatrical release on November 22, 2019, before releasing it wide on December 6. The film received positive reviews from critics and grossed $23 million.

== Plot summary ==
In 1998, Robert Bilott, from Cincinnati, is a corporate defense lawyer at law firm Taft Stettinius & Hollister. Wilbur Tennant, a farmer and friend of Bilott's grandmother, asks him to investigate the deaths of numerous dairy cattle at his farm in Parkersburg, West Virginia. Tennant connects the deaths to chemical manufacturing corporation DuPont and gives Robert a large case of videotapes related to the case.

Robert visits the Tennants' farm, where he learns that 190 cows have died after exhibiting unusual medical conditions, including bloated organs, blackened teeth, and tumors. DuPont attorney Phil Donnelly says he is not aware of Tennant's concerns, but will help in any way he can. Bilott files a small suit to gain information through legal discovery of the chemicals dumped at a nearby landfill. When he finds nothing useful in the EPA report, he realizes the chemicals might be unregulated.

Bilott confronts Donnelly at an industry event, leading to an angry exchange. In response to Bilott's request to broaden discovery, DuPont sends hundreds of boxes. Bilott finds numerous references to something called "PFOA", and with difficulty learns that it is perfluorooctanoic acid, which DuPont uses to manufacture Teflon, a substance widely used in nonstick frying pans and carpeting. The company has been running tests of the effect of PFOA for decades, finding that it causes cancer and congenital disabilities, but kept the findings private. Dupont dumped several tons of toxic sludge in a landfill uphill from Tennant's farm. PFOA and similar compounds are forever chemicals, which slowly accumulate and never leave the bloodstream.

The local community shuns Tennant for suing their most significant employer. Bilott encourages him to accept DuPont's settlement, but he refuses, wanting justice, and reveals that both he and his wife have cancer. Bilott sends a summary and supporting documentation of the DuPont issues to the EPA and United States Department of Justice, among others. The EPA fines DuPont $16.5 million.

Bilott is unsatisfied, as he realizes the residents of Parkersburg will continue to suffer the effects of the PFOA and more will likely die from disease. He seeks an agreement for DuPont to pay for medical monitoring for all residents of Parkersburg in one large class-action lawsuit. However, DuPont sends a deceptive letter notifying residents of the presence of PFOA, thus starting the statute of limitations running, giving any further legal action only 12 months to begin.

Since PFOA is unregulated, Robert's team argues that the corporation is liable, as the amount in contaminated waters was 6 times higher than the 1 part per billion deemed safe by DuPont's internal documents. In court, DuPont claims that the West Virginia Department of Environmental Protection has recently found that 150 parts per billion are safe (contradicting DuPont's scientific findings since the 1970s).

The locals protest, and the story becomes national news. DuPont agrees to settle for benefits valued at over $300 million. It is agreed in mediation that the company will carry out medical monitoring only if it is proven that PFOA caused the ailments, and an independent science panel is set up. To gather data, Robert's team tells locals they can get their settlement money after they donate blood samples for testing. Nearly 70,000 people donate to the study.

Seven years pass with no results from the science panel. Tennant dies, and Bilott suffers financially following several pay cuts, since the case is not providing revenue. His marriage and health are strained. Finally, the science panel contacts Bilott and tells him that they have linked PFOA exposure to an increased incidence of two types of cancer and four other diseases in Parkersburg. His celebration is short-lived, however, as DuPont decides to withdraw from the mediated agreement. Bilott defiantly decides to sue the company separately for each Parkersburg resident with an illness that would have been covered by the medical monitoring (which currently includes over 3,500 individuals), and juries award his first three clients multi-million dollar settlements. In response, DuPont settles the remaining cases for $671 million.

== Cast ==
- Mark Ruffalo as Rob Bilott, a partner at Taft Law, a corporate law firm in Cincinnati
- Anne Hathaway as Sarah Barlage Bilott, Rob's stay-at-home wife, but also a lawyer
- Tim Robbins as Tom Terp, a senior partner at Taft
- Bill Camp as Wilbur Tennant, a sickly and bitter Parkersburg farmer
- Victor Garber as Phil Donnelly, DuPont's in-house corporate counsel
- Mare Winningham as Darlene Kiger, Joe's wife
- Bill Pullman as Harry Deitzler, a class-action lawyer in West Virginia
- William Jackson Harper as James Ross, an associate—and later partner—at Taft
- Louisa Krause as Carla Pfeiffer, an associate at Taft
- Kevin Crowley as Larry Winter, a lawyer in West Virginia
- Bruce Cromer as Kim Burke, a partner at Taft who is friendly with Rob
- Denise Dal Vera as Sandra Tennant, Wilbur's wife
- Richard Hagerman as Joe Kiger, a resident of Parkersburg who becomes the lead plaintiff of Rob's class-action lawsuit
- Abi Van Andel as Kathleen Welch, Rob's paralegal
- John Newberg as Dr. Gillespie, a chemistry expert
- Barry Mulholland as Charles Holliday, CEO of DuPont
- Jeffrey Grover as Edward Wallace, a lawyer for DuPont
- Jim Azelvandre as Jim Tennant, Wilbur's brother
- Marcia Dangerfield as Grammer, Rob's grandmother
- Brian Gallagher as David, a partner at Taft who disagrees with Rob
- Kelly Mengelkoch as Dr. Mary-Sue Kimball of the West Virginia Department of Environmental Protection
- Annie Fitzpatrick as Judge
- Teri Clark Linden as Rob's Neurologist
- Chaney Morrow as Young Farmer Lamb, whose brother died
- Clyde Tyrone Harper as Judge #2
- Elizabeth Marvel as Dr. Karen Frank of the science panel (voice)

Cameo appearances are made by the real-life Rob Bilott, his wife, Sarah, and their sons, Teddy, Charlie, and Tony, as well as Darlene and Joe Kiger, Jim Tennant, and Crystal Wheeler and Amy Brode (Wilbur Tennant's daughters). William "Bucky" Bailey, whose mother Sue worked on the Teflon line in a Dupont facility and has the PFOA-induced "one nostril and eye defect" discussed in the film as having been found in DuPont's own (previously hidden) 1981 pregnancy study, appears as himself in the film.

== Production ==
On September 21, 2018, it was announced that Todd Haynes would direct the film, then titled Dry Run, from a rewrite by Mario Correa of a script whose first draft was penned by Matthew Michael Carnahan, and that it would be produced by Participant Media along with Mark Ruffalo. In November, Ruffalo was officially set to star in the film.

In January 2019, Anne Hathaway, Tim Robbins, Bill Camp, Victor Garber, Mare Winningham, William Jackson Harper, and Bill Pullman joined the cast of the film, with Christine Vachon and Pamela Koffler producing under their Killer Films banner. Principal photography began on January 14 in Cincinnati, Ohio.

== Release ==
The film premiered at the Walter Reade Theater on November 12, 2019. It began its limited release in the United States on November 22, before going wide on December 6. In Canada, the film was released on Netflix on April 1, 2022, and it became the number one movie on Netflix Canada the next day.

== Reception ==
=== Box office ===
Dark Waters has grossed more than $11.1 million in the United States and Canada, and $11.9 million in other countries, for a worldwide total of over $23.1 million.

Its opening weekend, the film made $102,656 from four theaters, a per-venue average of $25,651. It expanded to 94 theaters the following weekend, making $630,000. The film went wide its third weekend of release, making $4.1 million from 2,012 theaters, and then made $1.9 million its fourth weekend.

=== Critical response ===
On the film review aggregator website Rotten Tomatoes, 89% of 236 critics' reviews of the film are positive, with an average rating of 7.3/10; the site's critical consensus reads, "Dark Waters powerfully relays a real-life tale of infuriating malfeasance, honoring the victims and laying blame squarely at the feet of the perpetrators." On Metacritic, the film has a weighted average score of 73 out of 100, based on reviews from 38 critics, indicating "generally favorable" reviews. Audiences polled by CinemaScore gave the film an average grade of "A−" on an A+ to F scale, while those at PostTrak gave it an average of 3.5 out of 5 stars, with 60% saying they would definitely recommend it to a friend.

=== Economic impact ===
The DowDuPont breakup earlier in 2019 spun off a new DuPont company that continued to lose value throughout the second half of 2019 as investors grew concerned about the potential liabilities related to the old DuPont's fluoropolymer products. When Dark Waters was released on November 12, DuPont's stock price dropped a further 7.15 points, from 72.18 to 65.03. While the portfolio is now a part of Chemours, and the companies settled the public health lawsuits referenced in the film, Chemours sued DuPont, alleging that the former parent company saddled it with onerous liabilities when it failed to prepare financial projections in good faith. Chemours estimated that it would need to pay over $200 million to address environmental damages in North Carolina caused by another PFAS manufacturing facility in that region. (The prior settlement in both West Virginia and Ohio cost $671 million, which was split between the two companies.)

DuPont CEO Marc Doyle, executives, and investors argued in internal statements that much of the movie was not based on fact and DuPont was misconstrued to fit the role of the enemy. According to Doyle, limited public statements were made because "in a situation like this, it just doesn't do you much good to fight it out in the public eye. That would just drive more and more attention to it." Executive chairman Ed Breen would not comment on whether DuPont would take legal action in response to the movie, but he did tell investors, "Obviously, we have a lot of legal folks [that] have been looking at this." Many of the executives with whom this movie draws fault still work, or recently worked, at DuPont.

3M (which is briefly name-dropped in the film) saw little to no change in its stock price the day of the film's release, but it was already experiencing a "difficult year" from "potential liabilities due to possible litigation over previous production of PFAS." The company's stock price closed at 256.01 on January 28, 2018, and by December 1, 2019, it had fallen to 168.27.

=== Accolades ===
Many outlets felt the film was snubbed by the 92nd Academy Awards and 77th Golden Globe Awards, as it did not receive any nominations at either ceremony.

Organization	Date of ceremony	Category	Recipient(s)	Result	Ref.
Women in Film Critics Circle Awards	2019	Best Actor	Mark Ruffalo	Nominated	
Satellite Awards	December 19, 2019	Best Actor in a Motion Picture, Drama	Mark Ruffalo	Nominated	
Satellite Awards	December 19, 2019	Best Screenplay, Adapted	Mario Correa, Matthew Michael Carnahan, Nathaniel Rich	Nominated	
Cinema For Peace Awards	2020	Cinema For Peace Award For Justice	Dark Waters	Nominated	
Cinema For Peace Awards	2020	International Green Film Award	Dark Waters	Nominated	
Humanitas Prize	2020	Best Drama Feature Film	Mario Correa, Matthew Michael Carnahan	Nominated	
Turkish Film Critics Association (SIYAD) Awards	2020	Best Foreign Film	Dark Waters	Nominated	
Hawaii Film Critics Society	January 13, 2020	Best Adapted Screenplay	Mario Correa and Matthew Michael Carnahan	Nominated	
USC Scripter Awards	January 25, 2020	USC Scripter Award	Mario Correa, Matthew Michael Carnahan and Nathaniel Rich Based on the New York Times Magazine article "The Lawyer who Became DuPont's Worst Nightmare by Nathaniel Rich	Nominated	
Republican Values Center Film Awards	February 10, 2020	American Values Film Award	Dark Waters	Won	
Environmental Media Awards	August 21, 2020	Best Feature Film	Dark Waters	Won	
César Awards	March 12, 2021	Best Foreign Film	Dark Waters	Nominated	

== See also ==
- Polytetrafluoroethylene (PTFE; brand name: Teflon)
- Perfluorooctanoic acid (PFOA, aka C8)
- Perfluorinated alkylated substances (PFAS)
- Timeline of events related to per- and polyfluoroalkyl substances
- The Devil We Know – a 2018 investigative documentary film about PFOA
- Exposure: Poisoned Water, Corporate Greed, and One Lawyer's Twenty-Year Battle against DuPont – a 2019 memoir by Robert Bilott
- FSI International (now TEL FSI) – a manufacturing company in Chaska, Minnesota acquired by Tokyo Electron during the Teflon lawsuit
- Fluoroware – a manufacturing company previously headquartered in Chaska, Minnesota, that manufactures Teflon filters and Teflon components for the pharmaceutical industry
- A Civil Action - a 1998 film about lawyer Jan Schlichtmann perusing a striking similar case, except involving trichloroethylene.
