= Robert Bilott =

American attorney (born 1965)

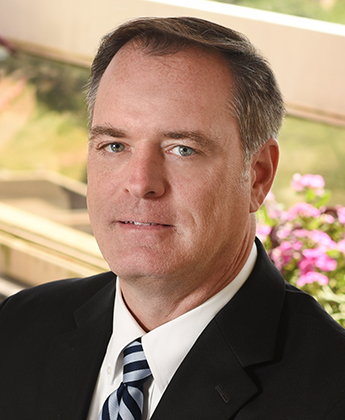
- Bilott in 2016
- Born: August 2, 1965 (age 61); Albany, New York, U.S.
- Education: New College of Florida (BA); Ohio State University (JD)
- Occupation: Environmental lawyer
- Known for: Class action lawsuit against DuPont on behalf of plaintiffs from Parkersburg, West Virginia
- Spouse: Sarah Barlage (m. 1996)
- Children: 3

Robert Bilott (born August 2, 1965) is an American environmental attorney from Cincinnati, Ohio. Bilott is known for the lawsuits against DuPont on behalf of plaintiffs injured by chemical waste dumped in rural communities in West Virginia. Bilott has spent more than twenty years litigating hazardous dumping of the chemicals perfluorooctanoic acid (PFOA) and perfluorooctanesulfonic acid (PFOS). They were unregulated as industry had never publicly identified them as having known hazardous effects, despite internal studies showing these results.

Bilott's litigation was the foundation for his memoir titled Exposure: Poisoned Water, Corporate Greed, and One Lawyer's Twenty-Year Battle Against DuPont (2019). As a result of his work, he became the subject of increasing media attention in the late 2010s. The 2018 documentary The Devil We Know and the 2019 feature film Dark Waters drew attention to his legal battles with Dupont and the hazards of these chemicals. This public attention resulted in his receiving numerous awards, including the international Right Livelihood Award.

In 2024, President Joe Biden announced the first standards for regulating PFAS in drinking water in the United States, as well as $1 billion in funding to aid districts and cities to protect their water supplies.

== Early life ==
Bilott was born on August 2, 1965, in Albany, New York. Bilott's father served in the United States Air Force, and Bilott spent his childhood on several air force bases. Because the family moved frequently, Bilott attended eight different schools before graduating from Fairborn High School in Fairborn, Ohio.

He earned a Bachelor of Arts degree in political science and urban studies from the New College of Florida. He earned a Juris Doctor from the Ohio State University Moritz College of Law in 1990.

== Career ==
Bilott was admitted to the bar in 1990 and began his law practice at Taft Stettinius & Hollister LLP in Cincinnati, Ohio. For eight years he worked almost exclusively for large corporate clients and his specialty was defending chemical companies. He became a partner at the firm in 1998.

=== Initial actions against DuPont ===
Bilott represented Wilbur Tennant of Parkersburg, West Virginia, whose cattle were dying. The farm was downstream from a landfill where DuPont had been dumping hundreds of tons of perfluorooctanoic acid. In the summer of 1999, Bilott filed a federal suit against DuPont in the United States District Court for the Southern District of West Virginia. In response, DuPont advised that DuPont and the United States Environmental Protection Agency would commission a study of the farmer's property, conducted by three veterinarians chosen by DuPont and three chosen by the Environmental Protection Agency. When the report was released, it blamed the Tennants for the dying cattle, claiming that poor husbandry was responsible: "poor nutrition, inadequate veterinary care and lack of fly control."

After Bilott discovered that thousands of tons of DuPont's PFOA had been dumped into the landfill next to the Tennants' property and that DuPont's PFOA was contaminating the surrounding community's water supply, DuPont settled the Tennants' case. PFOA was unregulated by EPA, and the industry had never reported the results of its internal studies showing it to be hazardous to humans and animals.

In August 2001, Bilott filed a class action lawsuit against DuPont on behalf of the approximately 70,000 people in West Virginia and Ohio with PFOA-contaminated drinking water. This was settled in September 2004, with class benefits valued at over $300 million, including DuPont agreeing to install filtration plants in the six affected water districts and dozens of affected private wells, a cash award of $70 million, and provisions for future medical monitoring to be paid by DuPont up to $235 million, if an independent science panel confirmed "probable links" between PFOA in the drinking water and human disease.

Because tens of thousands of people in the affected districts agreed to have their blood tested for the presence of PFOA, the independent scientific panel jointly selected by the parties (but required under the settlement to be paid for by DuPont) took years to analyze and process the results. It found that there was a probable link between drinking PFOA and kidney cancer, testicular cancer, thyroid disease, high cholesterol, pre-eclampsia, and ulcerative colitis. DuPont announced its withdrawal from the above agreement.

Bilott began opening individual personal-injury lawsuits against DuPont on behalf of affected users of the Ohio and West Virginia water supplies, who by 2015 numbered more than 3,500 individuals. After Dupont lost the first three cases for a total of $19.7 million in damages, in 2017 DuPont agreed to settle the remainder of the then-pending cases for $671.7 million.

Dozens of additional cases filed after the 2017 settlement were settled in 2021 for an additional $83 million (announced in conjunction with a $4 billion settlement between DuPont and its spin-off, Chemours, over PFAS liabilities), followed by an additional trial verdict and settlements of dozens of cancer cases in 2024 for another $58.5 million, resulting in total recoveries to date against DuPont for Bilott's class members in an excess of $850 million.

=== Subsequent actions ===
In 2018, Bilott filed a new case seeking new studies and testing of the larger group of PFAS chemicals on behalf of a proposed nationwide class of everyone in the United States who has PFAS chemicals in their blood, against several PFAS manufacturers, including 3M, DuPont, and Chemours. In March 2022, the federal court overseeing the case certified the case to proceed as a class action on behalf of millions of people with PFAS in their blood.

In 2018, Bilott was appointed by the federal court in South Carolina overseeing all cases filed across the United States for harm caused by PFAS in aqueous fire fighting foam to serve as national “Advisory Counsel” to the Plaintiffs’ Executive Committee overseeing all that consolidated multi-district litigation (the “AFFF MDL”). In 2021, Bilott was co-class counsel in the first class settlement in the AFFF MDL for those impacted by PFAS private drinking water well contamination from a Tyco fire training facility in Wisconsin, providing settlement benefits in excess of $15 million. In 2023, the largest drinking water settlements in US history were reached in the AFFF MDL with 3M and DuPont-related companies for PFAS impacts to US public water systems, valued at over $13 billion, followed by additional US public water system settlements in 2024 with Tyco and BASF, valued at another $1 billion and additional class settlement announced in 2026 with Carrier Global Corp, Archroma, Amerex Corp, and Nation Ford Chemical Co., collecting valued at approximately $150 million. In 2026, an additional $7.35 billion settlement was reached with 3M to resolve thousands of personal injury claims in the AFFF MDL. Bilott was also part of the legal team that settled PFAS claims by the State of Ohio against DuPont- related companies for $110 million in 2024 and the legal team that settled PFAS claims by the State of New Jersey against 3M for up to $450 million in 2025, settled New Jersey's related claims against Dupont-related companies later the same year for benefits valued up to over $2 billion, and settled claims for the State of North Carolina and local governments against the DuPont-related companies in 2026 for benefits valued at approximately $590 million.

In April 2024, the President Joseph R. Biden administration announced the first regulations for standards for PFAS in drinking water. It also announced $1 billion in funding to enable cities and districts to protect their water supplies from contamination.

=== Media notice ===
In 2016, Bilott's story was the focus of a featured cover story by Nathaniel Rich in the New York Times Magazine, entitled, "The Lawyer Who Became DuPont's Worst Nightmare". Rich's article was later published in his book, Second Nature (2021). Bilott's work was also featured in extensive articles in The Huffington Post ("Welcome to Beautiful Parkersburg") and The Intercept (multi-part "The Teflon Toxin" series).

Robert Bilott wrote the memoir Exposure: Poisoned Water, Corporate Greed, and One Lawyer's Twenty-Year Battle Against DuPont, first published in English in 2019 by Atria Books. It was later translated into Chinese (2022). and Japanese (2023). The audio book version is narrated by Jeremy Bobb, with the first chapter narrated by actor Mark Ruffalo. He played Bilott in Dark Waters (2019), the film adapted from Rich's article.

== Representation in other media ==
Nathaniel Rich's article, "The Lawyer Who Became DuPont's Worst Nightmare," was adapted for Dark Waters, a 2019 film starring Mark Ruffalo as Bilott, and Anne Hathaway as Bilott's wife, Sarah Barlage. The article also inspired U.S. Poet Laureate Tracy K. Smith to produce a poem, Watershed.

Bilott's investigation and litigation against DuPont are also featured in the feature-length American documentary The Devil We Know (2018) and the Swedish documentary, The Toxic Compromise. It is also the subject of the "Toxic Waters" episode of the multi-part feature documentary, Parched, which aired on the National Geographic TV channel in 2017.

Bilott is the subject of the song and video "Deep in the Water" by The Gary Douglas Band, and the song "Blank" / "Worker" by emo revival band The World Is a Beautiful Place & I Am No Longer Afraid to Die.

Bilott appears in Devil Put The Coal In The Ground (2022), a documentary about the suffering and environmental devastation that resulted from the coal industry and its decline. Additionally, Bilott appears in the Belgian documentary, Solvay, the Invisible Pollution (2023), about chemical giants and the widespread pollution of PFAS. He is interviewed in Toxic Bodies, a French documentary about industry use and knowledge of PFAS.

Bilott wrote the foreword of the book Forever Chemicals Environmental, Economic, and Social Equity Concerns with PFAS in the Environment (2021), by David M. Kempisty and Leeann Racz, published in 2021 by CRC Press. He also wrote the foreword to PFAS – The Eternal and Invisible Pollutants in the Water: Stories of Denied Rights and Active Citizenship, a book published in Italy in 2024.

He appears in the 2023 documentary, Burned: Protecting the Protectors, which focuses on PFAS exposures among firefighters and the Japanese documentary, Water is Treasure: PFAS - Fight for Life, addressing the impacts of PFAS in Okinawa. Bilott is also in the 2024 Australian documentary, Revealed: How to Poison a Planet, with Mark Ruffalo. In 2025, Bilott's work was featured in the book, They Poisoned the World, by Mariah Blake, and the book, Poisoning the Well, by Sharon Udasin and Rachel Frazen.

=== Accolades ===
In 2017, Bilott received the international Right Livelihood Award, also known as the "Alternative Nobel Prize", for his decades of work on PFAS chemical contamination issues. He was featured on a stamp issued in Austria, which commemorated the award.

In 2020, Bilott was part of a "Fight Forever Chemicals" social media and outreach campaign that was a Winner in Entertainment and a Finalist in Global Campaign, Media Partnership for the social media Shorty Awards. "Fight Forever Chemicals" also received a Gold Distinction in Environment and Sustainability.

Bilott currently serves on the board of directors for Less Cancer. He served on the board of trustees for Green Umbrella from 2020 to 2025, and the board of directors of the New College Foundation from 2024 to 2026. He had served on the alumni board for New College of Florida from 2018 to 2021. In 2021, Bilott received an Honorary Doctor of Laws Degree from New College of Florida and an Honorary Doctor of Science Degree from The Ohio State University's Environmental Science Graduate Program. In 2023, Bilott received an Honorary Doctor of Laws Degree from Thomas More University and received the Humanitarian Impact Award from the National PFAS Contamination Coalition in 2024. Bilott also became a fellow in the American College of Environmental Lawyers in 2024.

He is a fellow in the Right Livelihood College, an Honorary Professor at the National University of Cordoba in Argentina, and a lecturer at the Yale School of Public Health, Department of Environmental Health Sciences.

=== The Key Role in Italy ===
In early October 2017, the nascent No PFAS movement coordinated by Alberto Peruffo — learned about the American story through the New York Times article “The Lawyer Who Became DuPont’s Worst Nightmare” — brought Robert Bilott to Italy for a historic assembly-conference in Lonigo — at the epicenter of the problem—at the Teatro Comunale. This was made possible by a collective fundraising effort organized by No PFAS activists from the contaminated areas of Veneto, particularly with the help of Greenpeace (Giuseppe Ungherese) and the No PFAS Citizens of Montecchio Maggiore (Diego Meggiolaro), as well as associations such as Medicina Democratica (Maria Chiara Rodeghiero) and Rete Gas Vicentina (Marzia Albiero), all of whom have been on the front lines of the PFAS emergency that erupted in Veneto in 2013, the biggest contamination of drinking waters in the Western world. The event — titled “The Power of the Law: The American Testimony” — drew more than 1,000 people and will be followed by further events in the coming days in the Palace of the Veneto Region and at the Court of Vicenza. The links between DuPont and the Italian company Miteni, based in Trissino, which competes with 3M, are irrefutable. The two companies exchange not only the dangerous PFOA but also toxicity reports and analyses of the workers. On May 21 and 25, 2023, Robert Bilott appeared before the Court of Assizes in Vicenza and served as the key witness leading to the historic first-instance ruling on June 26, 2025, with convictions handed down to the top executives of the multinational corporations that successively led the former Miteni: the sentences range from 2 years and 8 months to 17 and a half years, for a total of 141 years in prison; compensation for over 300 civil parties, including private individuals and public entities, amounts to 75 million euros. During those same days in May, with Bilott’s support, activists will present the Ban PFAS Manifesto in Rome at the Chamber of Deputies of the Italian Parliament. The American attorney will promote this initiative in the U.S.

== Awards and recognition ==
- 2005 – Trial Lawyer of the Year. Presented by The Trial Lawyers For Public Justice Foundation.
- 2006 – Super Lawyer Rising Star. Selected by Cincinnati Magazine.
- 2008 – 100 Top Trial Lawyers from Ohio. Named by American Trial Lawyers Association.
- 2008 – Present Leading Lawyer Honoree. Name by Cincy Magazine Environmental Law.
- 2010 – Present Honoree, Environmental Law, Litigation. Named by Best Lawyers in America.
- 2011 – Present Top Local Plaintiff Litigation Star Honoree. Presented by Benchmark Plaintiff.
- 2014 – Clarence Darrow Award Honoree. Presented by Mass Tort Bar.
- 2016 – Giraffe Hero Commendation Honoree. Presented by Giraffe Heroes Project.
- 2016 – Joined the board of the Next Generation Choices Foundation (a.k.a. Less Cancer) "to support its mission in championing education and policy that will help prevent cancer."
- 2017 – Present Class Action Honoree. Presented by Kentucky Super Lawyers.
- 2017 – Right Livelihood Award. Presented by The Right Livelihood Foundation (December 1, 2017).
- 2017 – MVP for Class Action Honoree. Named by Law360.
- 2019 – Lawyer of the Year in Litigation – Environmental. Named by Best Lawyers.
- 2020 – Public Interest Environmental Law David Brower Lifetime Achievement Award.
- 2020 – Kentucky Bar Association Distinguished Lawyer Award.
- 2020 – Big Fish Award. Presented by Riverkeeper Fishermen's Ball.
- 2020 – Consumer Safety Award. Presented by the Kentucky Justice Association.
- 2021 – Lawyer of the Year in Litigation – Environmental. Named by Best Lawyers.
- 2021 – Honorary Doctor of Laws Degree from New College of Florida.
- 2022 – Lawyer of the Year in Environmental Law – Cincinnati. Named by Best Lawyers.
- 2023 – Lawyer of the Year in Litigation – Environmental – Cincinnati. Named by Best Lawyers.
- 2023 – Environmental Working Group's Changemaker Award.
- 2023 – Multicultural Health Institute's Community Champion Award.
- 2024 – Humanitarian Impact Award. Presented by the National PFAS Contamination Coalition.
- 2025 – Lawyer of the Year in Litigation – Environmental – Cincinnati. Named by Best Lawyers.
- 2025 – Hillside Trust Pope Coleman Award.
- 2026 – Lawyer of the Year in Litigation – Environmental – Cincinnati. Named by Best Lawyers.
- 2026 – Impact Award from the California Stormwater Quality Association.

== Personal life ==
In 1996, Bilott married Sarah Barlage. They have three sons.
