= Exposure (Bilott book) =

2019 memoir by Robert Bilott

- First edition
- Author: Robert Bilott
- Language: English
- Publisher: Atria Publishing Group
- Publication date: October 8, 2019
- Publication place: United States
- Pages: 400
- ISBN: 9781501172816

Exposure
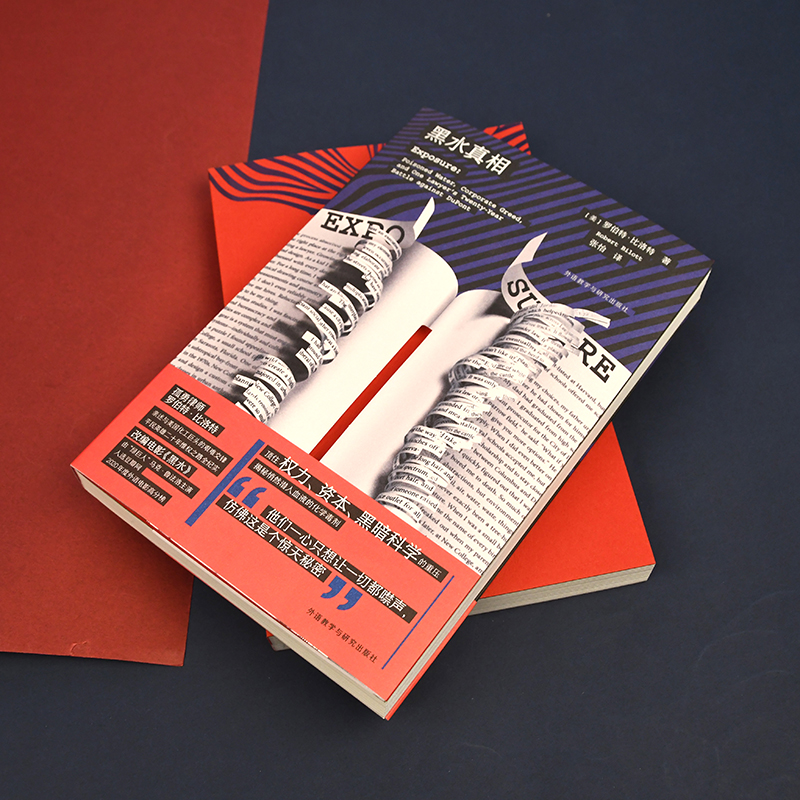
- Chinese Edition

Exposure
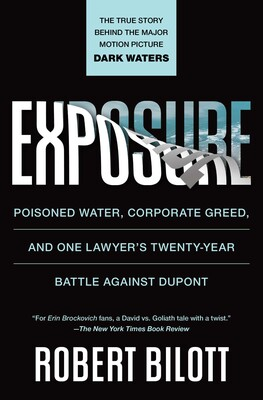
- Paperback Edition

Exposure: Poisoned Water, Corporate Greed, and One Lawyer's Twenty-Year Battle against DuPont is the 2019 memoir by Robert Bilott, an American environmental attorney at Taft Stettinius & Hollister. The book follows Bilott's personal and professional journey through the litigation that revealed a global crisis of persistent organic pollution due to PFOA and PFAS, referred to as "forever chemicals." For its contribution to broadening public awareness of environmental hazard, Exposure received the 2020 Green Prize for Sustainable Literature from the Santa Monica Public Library.

The book was published in the United States in 2019 by Atria Books/Simon & Schuster. It was released in hardcover on October 8, 2019, and in paperback on July 15, 2020.

The audiobook version (also available through Atria Books) is narrated by Jeremy Bobb. The first chapter narrated by actor Mark Ruffalo, who plays Bilott in the movie Dark Waters (2019), based on these events as reported in a 2016 New York Times feature article.

The book was published for the United Kingdom by Simon & Schuster UK, and has been translated into Chinese for its release on the Chinese market on November 28, 2022. On April 6, 2023, the book was translated into Japanese and released on the Japanese market.

== Reviews ==
According to writer Nathaniel Rich, writer at large for The New York Times Magazine, the book is "An intimate account of one of the most appalling environmental crimes in modern history. Exposure is a classic story of American good and American evil—of the triumph of ingenuity, diligence, and self-sacrifice over psychopathic corporate nihilism. Rob Bilott is a hero of our time." Rich had written a 2016 feature article about Bilott and his campaign, which was published in the New York Times magazine.

Gary Rivlin in the New York Times Book Review described Exposure a "David and Goliath tale with a twist…. Bilott skillfully tells the story of his epic battle with DuPont."

Kirkus Reviews said, "Leaves little doubt that year after year, the corporation misled government agencies, courts, and consumers into a false sense of security about the poisonous nature of their manufacturing processes."

The Law Library Journal says, "Exposure is an intriguing and easy-to-follow narrative that will have you up in arms about what might be in your drinking water. If you liked Erin Brockovich or A Civil Action, this book is a must-read.”

== Related films ==
Bilott's campaign was featured in the documentary The Devil We Know (2018). Rich's 2016 article about Bilott and these events in the New York Times was adapted for the 2019 motion picture Dark Waters, starring Mark Ruffalo as Robert Bilott.

Exposure
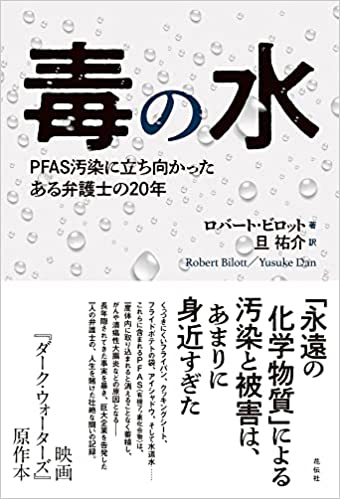
- Japanese edition
