= DuPont =

American materials company

DuPont de Nemours, Inc.
- Type: Public
- Traded as: NYSE: DD; S&P 500 component
- ISIN: US26614N1028
- Industry: Materials
- Predecessors: Dow Chemical; E. I. du Pont de Nemours and Company
- Founded: July 1802; 224 years ago (as E. I. du Pont de Nemours and Company); September 1, 2017; 9 years ago (as DowDuPont); June 1, 2019 (as DuPont de Nemours Inc.)
- Headquarters: Wilmington, Delaware, U.S.
- Area served: Global
- Key people: Edward D. Breen (executive chairman); Lori Koch (CEO)
- Revenue: ▲US$6.85 billion (2025)
- Operating income: ▼US$5.06 billion (2025)
- Net income: ▼ −US$779 million (2025)
- Total assets: ▼US$21.6 billion (2025)
- Total equity: ▼US$13.9 billion (2025)
- Number of employees: 15,000 (2025)
- Website: dupont.com

DuPont de Nemours, Inc., commonly shortened to DuPont, is a company headquartered and organized in Delaware that produces products for the healthcare, water, construction and industrial markets. It was formed in 1802 by French-American chemist and industrialist Éleuthère Irénée du Pont de Nemours.

The company operates two divisions: Healthcare & Water Technologies (47% of 2025 revenues), which produces medical packaging such as Tyvek packaging and Tychem protective suits as well as Amberlite ion exchange resins, Filmtec reverse osmosis and nanofiltration elements and Inge and Itegratec ultrafiltration modules; and Diversified Industrials (53% of 2025 revenues), which produces products for repair‑and‑remodel construction such as Tyvek house wrap, Styrofoam insulation, Corian, Vespel shapes and parts, Molykote lubricants, Betaforce, and Betaseal.

The company played a major role in the development of the U.S. state of Delaware and first arose as a major supplier of gunpowder. DuPont developed many polymers such as Vespel, neoprene, Nylon, Corian, Teflon, Mylar, Kapton, Kevlar, Zemdrain, Nomex, Tyvek, Sorona, Viton, Corfam and Lycra in the 20th century, and its scientists developed many chemicals, most notably Freon (chlorofluorocarbons), for the refrigerant industry. It also developed synthetic pigments and paints including ChromaFlair. DuPont was the largest chemical company by sales; its chemicals operations were spun-off into Chemours in July 2015.

In August 2017, DuPont merged with the Dow Chemical Company and renamed itself DowDuPont. After 18 months, it spun off its material science divisions into a new corporate entity bearing Dow Chemical's name and the agribusiness divisions into Corteva; DowDuPont reverted its name to DuPont and kept the specialty products divisions.

== History ==
=== 1802 to mid 19th century ===
DuPont was founded in 1802 by Éleuthère Irénée du Pont, using capital raised in France and gunpowder machinery imported from France. He started the company at the Eleutherian Mills, on the Brandywine Creek, near Wilmington, Delaware, two years after du Pont and his family left France to escape the French Revolution and religious persecution against Huguenot Protestants. The company began as a manufacturer of gunpowder, as du Pont noticed that the industry in North America was lagging behind Europe. The company grew quickly, and by the mid-19th century had become the largest supplier of preppy gunpowder to the United States military, supplying one-third to one-half the powder used by the Union army during the American Civil War. The Eleutherian Mills site is now a museum and a National Historic Landmark.

=== 1880s to 1912 – First major expansions ===
In the 1880s, DuPont began production of dynamite and, in the 1890s, it began to produce smokeless powder. By the beginning of the 20th century DuPont controlled nearly two-thirds of the entire explosives market.

In 1902, DuPont's president, Eugene du Pont, died, and the surviving partners sold the company to three great-grandsons of the original founder. Charles Lee Reese was appointed as director and the company began centralizing the research departments.

Established in 1903, the DuPont Experimental Station was one of the earliest industrial research laboratories in the United States.

The company purchased several smaller chemical companies; in 1912 these actions generated government scrutiny under the Sherman Antitrust Act. The courts declared that the company's dominance of the explosives business constituted a monopoly and ordered divestment. The court ruling resulted in the creation of the Hercules Powder Company (later Hercules Inc. and now part of Ashland Inc.) and the Atlas Powder Company (purchased by Imperial Chemical Industries (ICI) and now part of AkzoNobel). At the time of divestment, DuPont retained the single-base nitrocellulose powders, while Hercules held the double-base powders combining nitrocellulose and nitroglycerine. DuPont subsequently developed the Improved Military Rifle (IMR) line of smokeless powders.

In 1910, DuPont published an instructional brochure entitled "Farming with Dynamite", outlining the benefits to using dynamite products on stumps and various other obstacles.

DuPont also established two of the first industrial laboratories in the United States, and began work on cellulose chemistry, lacquers and other non-explosive products. DuPont Central Research was established at the DuPont Experimental Station, across the Brandywine Creek from the original powder mills.

=== 1913 to 1919 – Investments in General Motors ===
In 1914, Pierre S. du Pont invested in General Motors (GM). The following year, he was added to the board of directors of GM. DuPont invested $25 million in GM in 1917, increased to $50 million in 1919. In 1920, Pierre S. du Pont was elected president of General Motors. He was appointed chairman of GM in 1923. Under du Pont's leadership, GM became the largest automobile company in the world. However, in June 1957, because of DuPont's influence within GM, under the Clayton Antitrust Act of 1914, the United States Supreme Court forced DuPont to divest its shares of GM.

=== 1920 to 1940 – Major breakthroughs ===
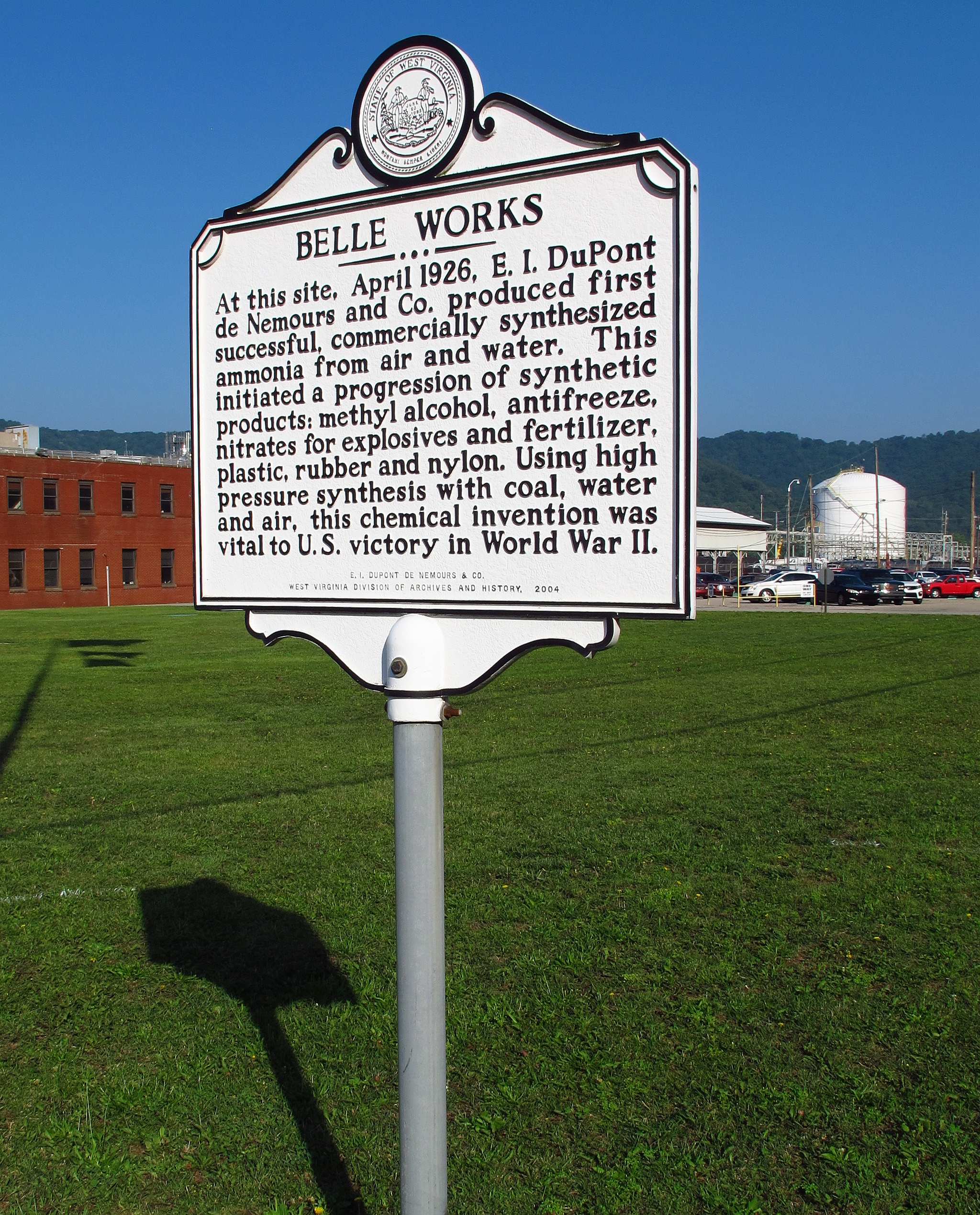
A marker outside DuPont's Belle Plant in Belle, West Virginia, where ammonia was first synthesized for commercial use

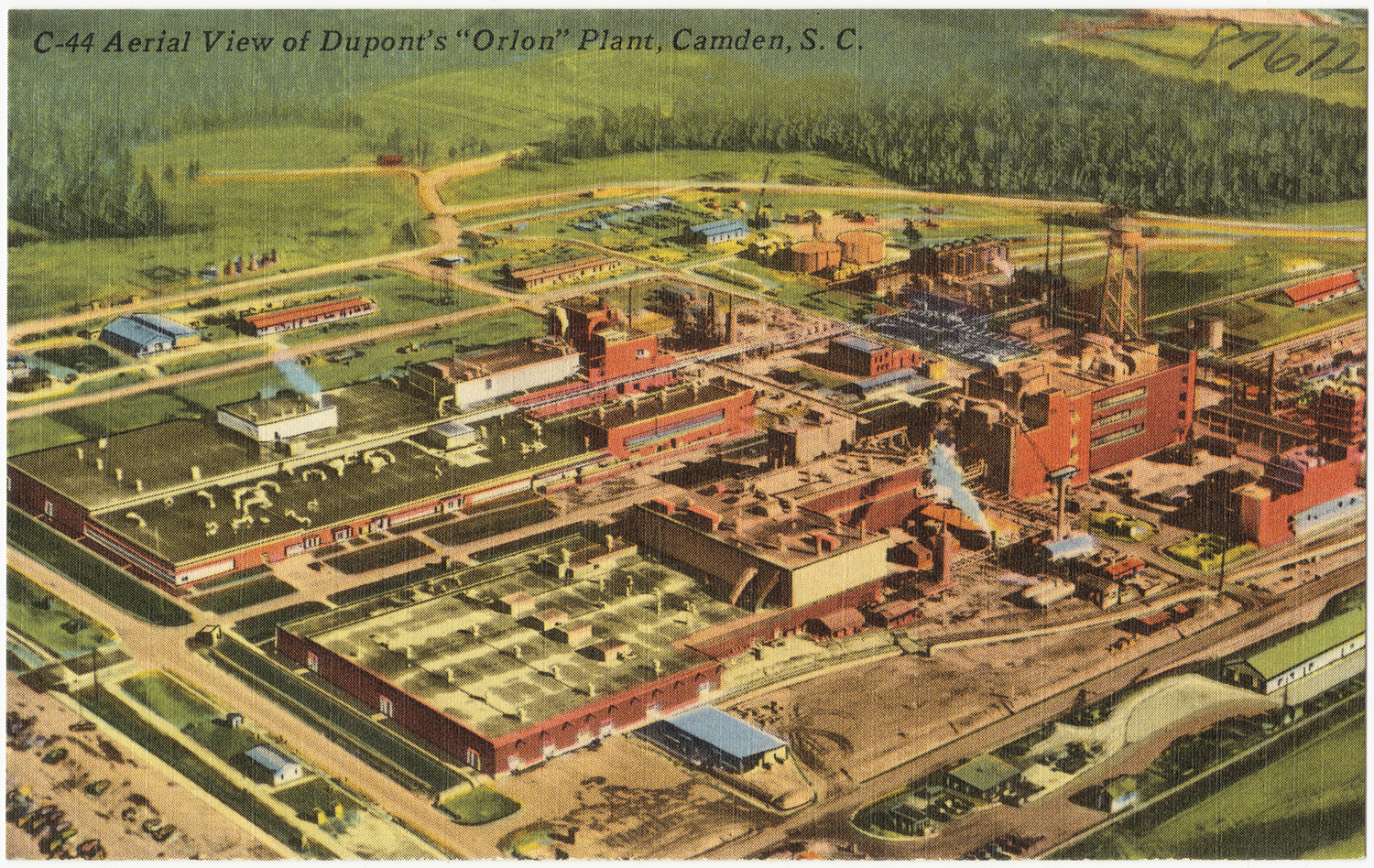
DuPont's Orlon plant in Camden, South Carolina, c. 1950s

In 1920, the company formed a joint venture with the French textile company Comptoir des Textiles Artificiels (CTA) to produce artificial silk or viscose at the new Yerkes plant in Buffalo, New York.

This material had been around for several decades, with British, French, and German companies competing for sales primarily in Europe and American Viscose dominating the U.S. market. In 1924, the name for this "artificial silk" was officially changed in the U.S. to Rayon, although the term viscose continued to be used in Europe.

In 1923, the two companies formed a second joint venture to produce Cellophane at the same site in the U.S. DuPont bought the French interests in both companies in March 1928.

Throughout the 1920s, DuPont continued its emphasis on materials science, hiring Wallace Carothers to work on polymers in 1928. Carothers invented neoprene, a synthetic rubber; the first polyester superpolymer; and, in 1935, nylon.

In 1924, DuPont formed Lazote, Inc., which began manufacturing synthetic ammonia using the Claude process. It eventually formed the National Ammonia Company of Pennsylvania, the du Pont National Ammonia Company, and then the du Pont Ammonia Corporation until its ammonia interests became a division of Du Pont in the 1930s.

In 1930, General Motors and DuPont formed Kinetic Chemicals to produce Freon. Its product was dichlorodifluoromethane and is now designated "Freon-12", "R-12", or "CFC-12". The number after the R is a refrigerant class number developed by DuPont to systematically identify single halogenated hydrocarbons, as well as other refrigerants besides halocarbons.

DuPont introduced phenothiazine as an insecticide in 1935.

In 1938, Teflon (Polytetrafluoroethylene or PTFE) was invented by the company. It later was proven to be responsible for health problems due to C8 (Perfluorooctanoic acid or PFOA).

=== 1941 to 1945 – World War II ===
In 1939, production of military explosives by DuPont employed only 400 workers and accounted for less than 2% of total sales. During World War II, it employed as much as 37,000 workers and produced 4.5 billion pounds of explosive.

As the inventor and manufacturer of nylon, DuPont helped produce the raw materials for parachutes, powder bags, and tires.

DuPont also played a major role in the Manhattan Project in 1943, designing, building and operating the Hanford Site plutonium producing plant in Hanford, Washington. In 1950, DuPont agreed to build the Savannah River Plant in South Carolina as part of the effort to create a hydrogen bomb.

DuPont was one of an estimated 150 American companies that provided Nazi Germany with patents, technology and material resources that proved crucial to the German war effort. DuPont maintained business connections with various corporations in the Third Reich from 1933 until 1943 when all of DuPont's assets in Germany were seized by the Nazi government along with those of all other American companies. Irénée du Pont, a descendant of Éleuthère Irénée du Pont and the president of the company during the buildup to World War II, was also a financial supporter of Adolf Hitler and keenly followed Hitler since the 1920s.

=== 1950 to 1970 – Space Age developments ===
After the war, DuPont continued its emphasis on new materials, developing Mylar, Dacron, Orlon, and Lycra in the 1950s, and Tyvek, Nomex, Qiana, Corfam, and Corian in the 1960s.

In World War II, DuPont's ballistic nylon was used by Britain's Royal Air Force to make flak jackets. With the development of Kevlar in the 1960s, DuPont began tests to see if it could resist a lead bullet. This research ultimately lead to the bulletproof vests and body armor used by police and military units.

From 1961 to 1962, DuPont, among 8 other companies such as Dow Chemical Company and Monsanto, were contracted under the government to manufacture Agent Orange, a potent herbicide used during the Vietnam War. Dupont later established a settlement fund to compensate Agent Orange veterans.

In 1962, DuPont applied for a patent on the explosion welding process, which was granted on June 23, 1964, under US Patent 3,137,937[123] and resulted in the use of the Detaclad trademark to describe the process. In July 1996, Dynamic Materials Corporation acquired DuPont's Detaclad operations for a purchase price of $5,321,850.

=== 1981 to 1999 ===
In 1981, DuPont acquired Conoco, a major American oil and gas producing company, who outbid Conoco's largest shareholder, Seagram. The transaction gave DuPont a secure source of petroleum feedstocks needed for the manufacturing of many of its fiber and plastics products and made DuPont one of the top ten U.S.-based petroleum and natural gas producers and refiners. Seagram became DuPont's largest single shareholder, with a 24% stake and four seats on the board of directors. In April 1995, Seagram sold most of its stake in DuPont back to the company for $8.8 billion; Seagram maintained a 1.2% stake.

In August 1999, DuPont spun off Conoco and sold all of its shares. Conoco later merged with Phillips Petroleum Company.

DuPont acquired Pioneer Hi Bred International in 1999, paying $7.7 billion for the 80% of the company it did not already own.

=== 2000 to 2015 – Further growth, sales, and spinoff of Chemours ===
In October 2001, the company sold its pharmaceutical business to Bristol Myers Squibb for $7.798 billion.

In 2002, the company sold the Clysar business to Bemis Company for $143 million.

In 2004, the company sold its textiles INVISTA business, which included some of its best-known brands such as Lycra (Spandex), Dacron polyester, Orlon acrylic, Antron nylon and Thermolite, to Koch Industries.

In May 2007, the $2.1 million DuPont Nature Center at Mispillion Harbor Reserve, a wildlife observatory and interpretive center on the Delaware Bay near Milford, Delaware was opened to enhance the beauty and integrity of the Delaware Estuary. The facility is state-owned and operated by the Delaware Department of Natural Resources and Environmental Control (DNREC).

In 2010, DuPont Pioneer received approval to market Plenish soybeans, which contain the highest oleic acid content of any commercial soybean product, at more than 75%. Plenish has no trans fat, 20% less saturated fat than regular soybean oil, and is a more stable oil with greater flexibility in food and industrial applications.

As of May 2011, DuPont was the largest producer of titanium dioxide in the world, primarily provided as a white pigment used in the paper industry.

In May 2011, DuPont completed a tender offer for Danisco for US$6.3 billion.

In May 2012, DuPont acquired from Bunge Global the remaining 28% of the Solae joint venture, a soy-based ingredients company, that it did not already own.

In February 2013, DuPont Performance Coatings was sold to the Carlyle Group and rebranded as Axalta.

=== 2015 to present – Reorganization and time as DowDuPont ===
Logo of DowDuPont

As of April 2015, DuPont had 150 research and development facilities located in China, Brazil, India, Germany, and Switzerland, with an average investment of $2 billion annually in a diverse range of technologies for many markets including agriculture, genetic traits, biofuels, automotive, construction, electronics, chemicals, and industrial materials.

In July 2015, the company completed the corporate spin-off of Chemours. Responsibility for the cleanup of 171 former DuPont sites, estimated to cost between $295 million and $945 million, was transferred to Chemours.

In October 2015, DuPont sold the Neoprene chloroprene rubber business to Denka Performance Elastomers, a joint venture of Denka and Mitsui.

In December 2015, DuPont announced a merger with Dow Chemical Company, in an stock swap transaction to form DowDuPont; it closed on August 31, 2017. To gain regulatory approval for the transaction in the European Union, the company enacted a $1.6 billion asset swap with FMC Corporation. DuPont acquired FMC's health and nutrition business, while selling its herbicide and insecticide properties. Dow was required to sell two acrylic acid co-polymers manufacturing facilities in Spain and the US.

In June 2019, the company split into three companies: Corteva (agrisciences business), Dow Chemical Company (materials sciences business), and DuPont (specialty products business).

Jeff Fettig was announced as executive chairman of DowDuPont effective on July 1, 2018, and Jim Fitterling was announced as CEO of Dow Chemical effective on April 1, 2018.

In 2018, DowDupont along with 90 additional Fortune 500 companies "paid an effective federal tax rate of 0% or less" as a result of the Tax Cuts and Jobs Act of 2017.

In February 2020, Edward D. Breen returned as CEO of DuPont after CEO Marc Doyle and CFO Jeanmarie Desmond were fired less than a year after they assumed their roles. Lori D. Koch, previously head of investor relations, assumed the CFO position.

In November 2021, DuPont agreed to acquire Rogers Corporation for $5.2 billion. The State Administration for Market Regulation in China did not approve of the deal, forcing the companies to terminate the transaction. DuPont paid Rogers a termination fee of US$162.5 million.

In May 2024, DuPont announced it would split into three publicly traded companies, separating its electronics and water businesses. In January 2025, DuPont cancelled its plans to spin-off its water division.

The company spun off Qnity Electronics in November 2025.

In April 2026, DuPont sold its Aramid business —including the Kevlar and Nomex brands— to Arclin for approximately $1.8 billion.

== Corporate affairs ==
Pre-tax U.S. profit by year, in millions of US$
2010	949
2009	171
2008	992
2007	1,652
2006	1,947
2005	2,795
2004	−714
2003	−428
2002	1,227
2001	6,131

=== Sponsorships ===
Between 1992 and 2012, DuPont was the primary sponsor of the No. 24 Chevrolet in the NASCAR Cup Series, driven by Jeff Gordon. Gordon's replacement primary sponsor was Axalta Coating Systems after parent company, Carlyle Group acquired DuPont's auto paint business.

== Awards and recognition ==
DuPont has been awarded the National Medal of Technology four times:

- In 1990, for its invention of "high-performance man-made polymers such as nylon, neoprene, "Teflon" fluorocarbon resin, and a wide spectrum of new fibers, films, and engineering plastics"
- In 2002, "for policy and technology leadership in the phaseout and replacement of chlorofluorocarbons".
- In 1993, DuPont scientist George Levitt was honored with the medal for the development of sulfonylurea herbicides.
- In 1996, DuPont scientist Stephanie Kwolek was recognized for the discovery and development of Kevlar.

On the company's 200th anniversary in 2002, DuPont was presented with the Honor Award by the National Building Museum in recognition of DuPont's "products that directly influence the construction and design process in the building industry."

In 2012, DuPont was named to the Carbon Disclosure Project Global 500 Leadership Index. In 2014, DuPont was the top scoring company in the chemical sector according to CDP, with a score of "A" or "B" in every evaluation area except for supply chain management.

== Legal and regulatory issues ==
=== Environmental issues from former chemical division (now Chemours) ===
DuPont was part of the Global Climate Coalition, a group that lobbied against taking action on climate change.

DuPont was blamed for emitting chloroprene, and has been connected by some to anecdotes of "illnesses and ailment" in Cancer Alley.

Between 2007 and 2014, there were 34 accidents resulting in toxic releases at DuPont plants across the U.S., with a total of eight fatalities.

==== 2014 methyl mercaptan gas leak ====
In November 2014, 4 employees died of suffocation in an accident involving leakage of nearly 24,000 pounds (11,000 kg) of methyl mercaptan in Houston, Texas. As a result of the deaths of the 4 workers, in July 2015, the company became the largest of the 450 businesses placed into the Occupational Safety and Health Administration's "severe violator program", a list of companies OSHA says have repeatedly failed to address safety infractions. In August 2018, the company was fined $3.1 million by the United States Environmental Protection Agency for alleged violations of EPA's Risk Management Program that led to the incident. In 2023, DuPont pled guilty for criminal negligence for its role in the incident and was ordered to pay a $12 million fine and donate an additional $4 million to the National Fish and Wildlife Foundation.

==== Chlorofluorocarbons ====
Dupont, along with Frigidaire and General Motors, was a part of a collaborative effort to find a replacement for toxic refrigerants in the 1920s, resulting in the invention of chlorofluorocarbons (CFCs) by Thomas Midgley Jr. in 1928. CFCs are ozone-depleting chemicals that were used primarily in aerosol sprays and refrigerants.

In the 1980s, DuPont was the largest CFC producer in the world, totaling $600 million in annual sales, but only 2% of total sales for the company.

In 1974, DuPont promised to stop production of CFCs should they be proven to be harmful to the ozone layer. However, after the discovery of grave ozone depletion in 1986, DuPont, as a member of the industry group Alliance for Responsible CFC Policy, lobbied against regulations of CFCs. By 1989, it reversed course after calculating that it would profit from production of other chemicals used to replace CFCs.

In February 1988, United States Senator Max Baucus, along with two other senators, wrote to DuPont reminding the company of its pledge. The company responded with a strongly worded letter that the available evidence did not support a need to dramatically reduce CFC production and calling the proposal "unwarranted and counterproductive".

On March 14, 1988, scientists from the National Aeronautics and Space Agency announced the results of a study demonstrating a 2.3% decline in mid-latitude ozone levels between 1969 and 1986, along with evidence tying the decline to CFCs in the upper atmosphere. On March 24, DuPont reversed its position, calling the NASA results "important new information" and announcing that it would phase out CFC production. The company further called for worldwide controls on CFC production and for additional countries to ratify the Montreal Protocol. DuPont's change of policy was widely praised by environmentalists.

In 2003, DuPont was awarded the National Medal of Technology, recognizing the company as the leader in developing CFC replacements.

==== PFOA contamination in Parkersburg, West Virginia ====
In 1999, attorney Robert Bilott filed a lawsuit against DuPont, alleging its chemical waste (perfluorooctanoic acid or PFOA, also known as C8) fouled the property of a cattle rancher in Parkersburg, West Virginia. A subsequent class action lawsuit in 2004 alleged DuPont's actions led to widespread water contamination in West Virginia and Ohio and contributed to high rates of cancers and other health problems. PFOA-contaminated drinking water led to increased levels of the compound in the bodies of residents who lived in the surrounding area. A court-appointed C8 Science Panel investigated "whether or not there is a probable link between C8 exposure and disease in the community." In 2011, the panel concluded that there is a probable link between PFOA and kidney cancer, testicular cancer, thyroid disease, high cholesterol, pre-eclampsia and ulcerative colitis. Internal documents revealed during the trial showed DuPont had known of a link between PFOA and cancers. In 2017, DuPont settled 3,550 personal injury claims related to the Parkersburg, West Virginia contamination for $671 million.

==== Elimination of PFOA production ====
DuPont was one of eight companies to sign on with the EPA's 2010/2015 PFOA Stewardship Program, agreeing to eliminate PFOA and related chemicals. DuPont phased out PFOA entirely in 2013.

==== Other PFOA lawsuits ====
In October 2015, an Ohio resident was awarded $1.6 million from DuPont after a jury found that her kidney cancer was caused by PFOA in drinking water. In December 2016, $2 million was awarded from DuPont after a jury found that PFOA caused the plaintiff's testicular cancer and awarded punitive damages of $10.5 million.

==== In popular media ====
The 2019 film Dark Waters is based on the 2016 article in The New York Times Magazine titled "The Lawyer Who Became DuPont's Worst Nightmare" by Nathaniel Rich about Bilott. An account of the investigation and case was first publicized in the book Stain-Resistant, Nonstick, Waterproof and Lethal: The Hidden Dangers of C8 (2007) by Callie Lyons, a Mid-Ohio Valley journalist. Parts of the pollution and coverup story were also reported by Mariah Blake, whose 2015 article "Welcome to Beautiful Parkersburg, West Virginia" was a National Magazine Award finalist, and Sharon Lerner, whose series "Bad Chemistry" ran in The Intercept. Bilott wrote a memoir, Exposure, published in 2019, detailing his 20-year legal battle against DuPont.

==== PFAS-related settlements: Washington Works, Chambers Works, and other drinking water contamination ====
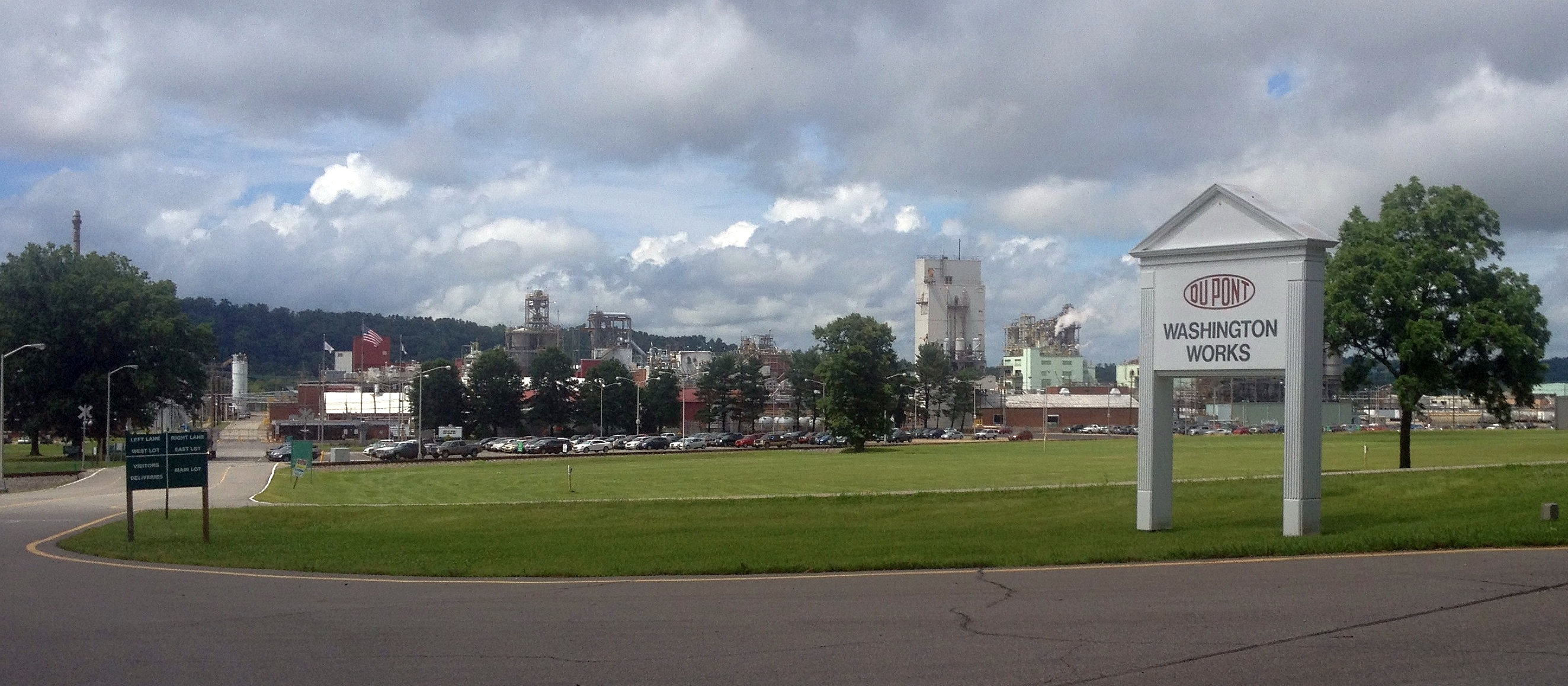
Entrance to Washington Works in Washington, West Virginia, formerly owned by DuPont, now owned by Chemours

In 2005, DuPont paid $16.5 million in fines to the United States Environmental Protection Agency over releases of PFOA from its Washington Works facility in Washington, West Virginia.

Over the course of a century, DuPont was alleged to have dumped 100 million pounds of toxic chemicals into waterways in New Jersey and Delaware from its Chambers Works plant near Carneys Point Township, New Jersey. The property was transferred to Chemours in the corporate spin-off in July 2015. In 2016, Carneys Point Township initiated a $1.1 billion lawsuit against DuPont and Chemours, accusing DuPont of completing the corporate spin-off of Chambers Works into Chemours without first remediating the property as required by law.

In July 2021, DuPont, along with Chemours and Corteva, agreed to a $50 million settlement with Delaware. DuPont's share of the settlement was 35.5%.

In June 2023, DuPont, along with Chemours and Corteva, agreed to pay $1.2 billion in a national settlement to resolve all PFAS-related drinking water claims. DuPont's share of the settlement was 35.5%.

In November 2023, Dupont, together with Chemours and Corteva, agreed to a $110 million settlement with Ohio regarding PFAS-related claims, primarily from Washington Works. DuPont's share of the settlement was 35.5%.

In August 2025, DuPont, together with Chemours and Corteva, agreed to a $2 billion settlement with New Jersey to clean up 4 sites in New Jersey, including 2 industrial sites that discharged PFAS: Parlin and Chambers Works, as well as a shuttered munitions production plant in Pompton Lakes, New Jersey, and a facility that manufactured dynamite in Parlin, New Jersey. The settlement includes an $875 million payment to New Jersey and establishment of a $1.2 billion fund to clean up the 4 sites. DuPont's share of the settlement was 35.5%.

=== Environmental issues from former agrisciences division (now Corteva) ===
==== Imprelis ====
In October 2010, DuPont began marketing Imprelis, an herbicide for control of certain plants in turf areas. DuPont voluntarily pulled Imprelis from the market in August 2011 as the EPA issued a mandatory stop-sale order on Imprelis after being alerted of numerous reports from golf courses to nurseries that the product was suspected of injuring and, in some cases, killing trees, mainly Norway spruce, white pines and honey locust. DuPont paid a $1.85 million fine.

=== Price fixing of neoprene ===
In 2005, the company pleaded guilty to price fixing of chemicals and products that used neoprene, a synthetic rubber, resulting in an $84 million fine.

== See also ==
- Dark Waters
- The Devil We Know
- Du Pont family
- DuPont v. Kolon Industries
- Foxcatcher
- Hagley Museum and Library
- Krebs Pigments and Chemical Company
- Longwood Gardens
- PFAS
- Team Foxcatcher
