= Taft Stettinius & Hollister =

American law firm

Taft Stettinius & Hollister LLP
- No. of offices: 24
- No. of attorneys: 1,300
- No. of employees: 2,200
- Major practice areas: Antitrust, Business, Business Restructuring, Bankruptcy & Creditor Rights, Domestic Relations, Employment, Energy, Environmental, Finance, Gaming, Government Contracts, Health & Life Sciences, Higher Education, Intellectual Property, Labor Relations, Litigation, Pharmaceutical & Life Sciences Litigation, Private Client, Public Finance, Real Estate, Construction, Tax, Technology Services
- Key people: Robert J. Hicks, Chairman and Managing Partner
- Date founded: 1885
- Founder: Worthington, Strong, Stettinius & Hollister; Taft & Taft
- Company type: Limited Liability Partnership
- Website: taftlaw.com

Taft Stettinius & Hollister, commonly known as Taft, is an American, AmLaw100 law firm founded in 1885 with 24 offices in the United States.

== History ==
Taft traces its roots back to 1885 when William Worthington and Edward W. Strong founded Worthington & Strong in Cincinnati. John L. Stettinius and John B. Hollister joined the firm after its founding; at this point, the firm became known as Worthington, Strong, Stettinius & Hollister.

In January 1923, Worthington died. In the following year, a young firm headed by Robert A. Taft and Charles P. Taft II joined the older firm to become Taft Stettinius & Hollister LLP.

In 1947, the firm's labor department, led by J. Mack Swigert, was instrumental in helping Robert Taft, who had become a United States Senator, draft and pass the groundbreaking Taft–Hartley Act that regulated labor unions. In the late 1960s-early 1970s, Murray S. Monroe founded the firm's Antitrust practice.

More recently, Rob Bilott, a firm partner, was recognized for his work representing West Virginians in the environmental litigation against DuPont beginning in the 1990s, which was the subject of the 2019 film Dark Waters.

Since the 1980s, the firm's expansion beyond Cincinnati has been accomplished with the aid of mergers with local firms with its various branch offices, including Kelley, McCann, and Livingston of Cleveland in 2001, Sommer Barnard of Indianapolis in 2008, Kahn Kleinman of Cleveland in 2008, Chester, Wilcox, and Saxbe of Columbus in 2012, and Shefsky and Froelich of Chicago in 2014.

On August 29, 2019, partners at Briggs & Morgan of Minneapolis voted to merge with Taft. The merger became effective January 1, 2020. In February 2021, Taft opened an office in Washington, D.C. In December 2022, it opened an office in Detroit, Michigan through a merger with Jaffe Raitt Heuer & Weiss.

On Jan. 1, 2025, Taft completed its merger with the Denver law firm, Sherman & Howard L.L.C., effectively expanding into the Mountain West region. The firm merged with Mrachek Law and expanded into Southeast Florida, effective June 30, 2025.

Taft agreed to merge with the Atlanta firm Morris Manning & Martin, LLP that had lost many practice leaders to other law firms, the merger taking effect December 31, 2025.

Taft has grown revenue by approximately 440% since Jan. 1, 2017.

== Practice areas ==
The firm's practice areas include business and finance, business restructuring, bankruptcy and creditor rights, domestic relations, employment, environmental, gaming, government contracts, health and life sciences, higher education, intellectual property, labor relations, litigation, pharmaceutical and life sciences litigation, private client, public finance, real estate, tax, technology services and more. Taft employs over 1,250 attorneys.

== Offices ==
Taft has offices in Cincinnati, Cleveland, Columbus, Dayton and Delaware, Ohio; Chicago, Illinois; Colorado Springs, Aspen, and Denver, Colorado; Detroit, Michigan; Indianapolis, Indiana; Atlanta, Georgia; Covington, Kentucky; Minneapolis, Minnesota; Phoenix, Arizona; and Washington, D.C. The firm has smaller, specialty offices in Las Vegas and Reno, Nevada; Albuquerque, New Mexico; Aspen, Colorado; and Naples, Stuart, and West Palm Beach, Florida.

== Notable present and past attorneys ==
- Robert Bilott, environmental lawyer
- John Cranley, Mayor of Cincinnati (2013–2022)
- Peter Deegan, United States Attorney for the Northern District of Iowa (2017–2021)
- Virginia Emerson Hopkins, Senior U.S. District Judge for the Northern District of Alabama
- Marcia Fudge, former Secretary of the United States Department of Housing and Urban Development (2021–2024) and U.S. Representative from Ohio (2008–2021)
- Susan P. Graber, U.S. Circuit Judge for the Ninth Circuit and former Justice of the Oregon Supreme Court (1990–1998)
- Sarah Morrison, U.S. District Judge for the Southern District of Ohio (2019–present) and Administrator for the Ohio Bureau of Workers' Compensation (2016–2019)
- John B. Nalbandian, U.S. Circuit Judge for the Sixth Circuit
- Caleb Nelson, Emerson G. Spies Distinguished Professor of Law at the University of Virginia School of Law
- Charles Phelps Taft II, Mayor of Cincinnati (1955–1957)
- Charles R. Saxbe, former member of the Ohio House of Representatives (1975-1982) and 1982 Republican candidate for Ohio Attorney General
- Robert A. Taft, U.S. Senator from Ohio (1939–1953)
- Robert Taft Jr., U.S. Senator from Ohio (1971–1976), U.S. Representative from Ohio (1963–1965; 1967–1971)
