= Under the Gun (2016 film) =

- Poster
- Directed by: Stephanie Soechtig
- Produced by: Olivia Ahnemann; Joshua Kunau; Kristin Lazure; Stephanie Soechtig
- Narrated by: Katie Couric
- Cinematography: Josh Salzman
- Edited by: Brian Lazarte
- Music by: Brian Tyler
- Release date: January 30, 2016 (Sundance)
- Running time: 110 minutes
- Country: United States
- Language: English

Under the Gun is a 2016 American documentary film about the gun debate in the United States. The documentary was directed by Stephanie Soechtig and narrated by Katie Couric, who also served as an executive producer.

== Release ==
The film was shown at the Temple Theater as part of the Sundance Film Festival on January 30, 2016. Then it was shown at Epix on May 16, 2016. The film was also shown at Sundance in January 2017.

== Reception ==
The film has a 100% rating on Rotten Tomatoes based on 10 reviews.

Geoff Berkshire of Variety gave the film a positive review and wrote, "Gun acknowledges the solutions to this ongoing problem are neither easy nor obvious, while persuasively arguing that more, surely, can be done."
