= Kolon Industries =

Korean chemical and textile manufacturing company

Kolon Industries Inc.
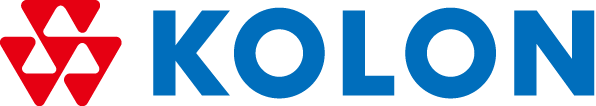

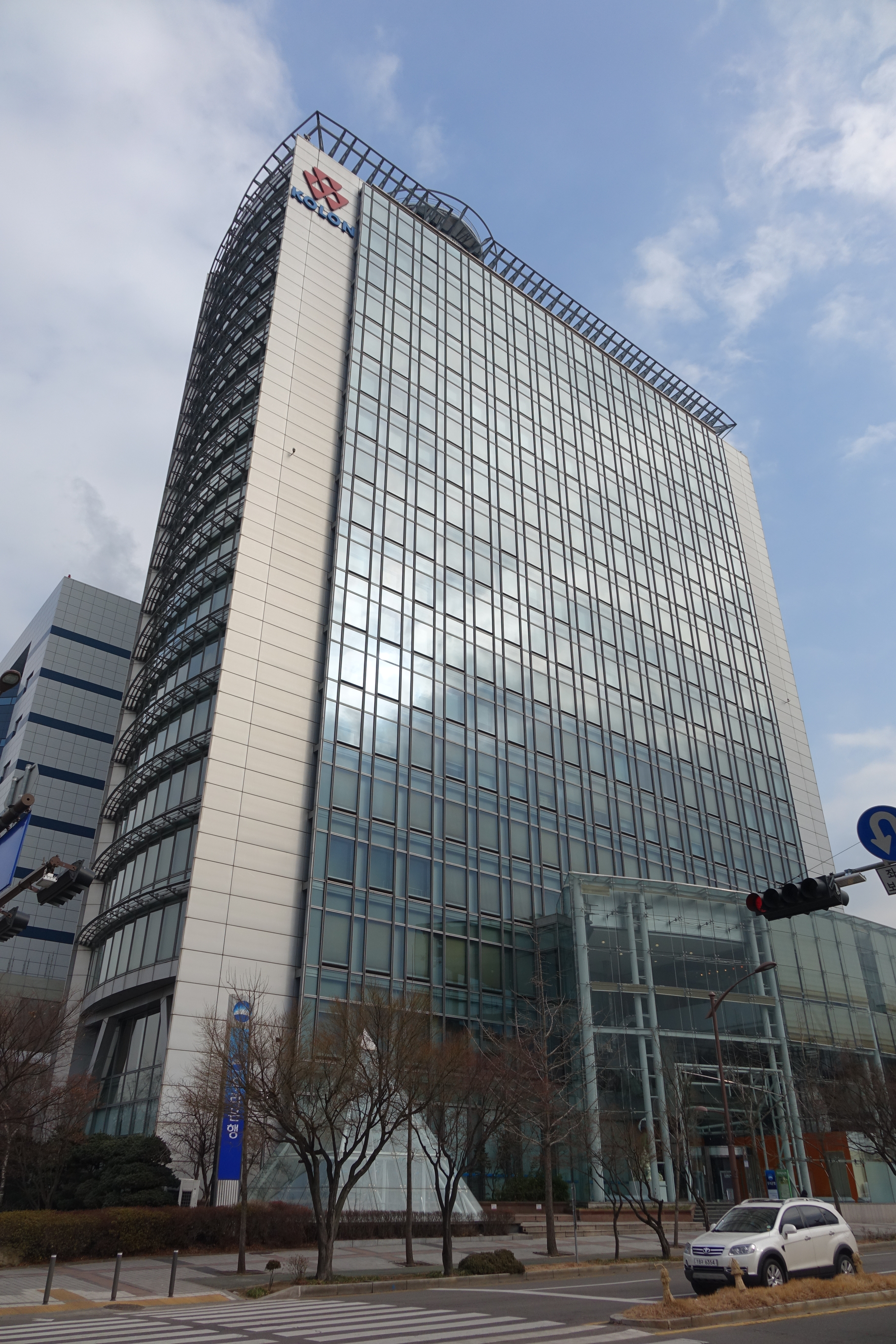
- Native name: 코오롱인더스트리
- Company type: Public company
- Industry: Industrial materials: Film/Electronic materials; Chemicals; Fashion
- Founded: April 12, 1957; 68 years ago Daegu, South Korea
- Headquarters: Daegu
- Revenue: 3,905,572,000,000 Won (2014)
- Total assets: 3,537,038,000,000 Won (2014)
- Website: English website

Kolon Industries is a Korean chemical and textile manufacturing company. It was founded in 1957 as Korea Nylon Inc., an early manufacturer in the Korean nylon industry. It has since expanded to produce chemicals, other materials and fashion. In 2015 Kolon Industries opened a shopping mall built with shipping containers, the first of its kind in South Korea. It has a US subsidiary, Kolon USA Inc., selling polyester film and nylon film.

== Controversies ==
Kolon Industries was the defendant in the lawsuit DuPont v. Kolon Industries, about the alleged theft of trade secrets concerning Kevlar. The lawsuit was settled in 2015, with damages of US$275 million being paid to DuPont. The company also pleaded guilty to a federal charge of conspiracy to convert trade secrets, for which they will pay $85 million in criminal fines.

== See also ==
- Korea Open (golf)
