= Murray S. Monroe Sr. =

American lawyer

- Born: September 25, 1925
- Died: September 2, 2003 (aged 78)
- Education: Yale University (B.S.); University of Pennsylvania Law School (JD)
- Occupation: lawyer at Taft, Stettinius & Hollister
- Known for: Antitrust law
- Spouse: Sally Longstreth Monroe
- Children: Tracy, Murray, Courtney, David

Murray S. Monroe Sr. (September 25, 1925 - September 2, 2003) was a Cincinnati-based lawyer for Taft, Stettinius & Hollister and founded the firm's Antitrust practice.

== Background ==
Murray Shipley Monroe Sr. was born on September 25, 1925. He graduated from The Governor's Academy prep school in 1943, where he was awarded the school's Morse Flag. He served in the U.S. Navy during World War II. Following military service, he earned a Bachelor of Engineering in 1946 and B.S. in 1947 from Yale University. In 1950, he earned a Juris Doctor degree from the University of Pennsylvania Law School, where he also served as editor of UPenn's Law Review.

== Career ==
Monroe joined Taft, Stettinius & Hollister in 1950 and worked there for the next 53 years. His name appeared third on the firm's letterhead after Robert Taft Jr.

As a lawyer, Monroe developed the firm's Antitrust practice in the 1960s: by 1993, "Taft’s antitrust practice was rated No. 1 in the Midwestern United States by the Global Research Survey of 1,300 lawyers nation-wide." Clients included: Olin Mathieson, Marathon Oil, Sperry Rand, Kroger, Union Oil, Kimball International, Leggett & Platt, Central Investment, Hilltop Concrete, McGraw-Edison, Globe Chemical, and Ashland Oil. He remained senior partner of counsel at the time of his death. For the firm, he wrote law review articles; trained the firm's lawyers in legal writing, research, and advocacy; and served on all major committees.

As a legal scholar as well as member of the Ohio State Bar Association, Monroe served on the faculty of the Ohio Continuing Legal Education Institute, where he taught antitrust law seminars and wrote for law journals. He taught Intensified Antitrust Law seminars.

== Personal and death ==
Monroe married Sally Longstreth, with whom he had four children: Tracy, Murray, Courtney, and David.

For the Seven Hills School, he served on its board of trustees for a decade, mostly as chairman or treasurer. Under his leadership, Seven Hills expanded its capital and became one of Cincinnati's best known schools. He also served on the board of the College Preparatory School.

Murray S. Monroe died age 78 on September 2, 2003, in Portland, Maine, of acute myeloid leukemia.

== Legacy ==
The Cincinnati Enquirer called Monroe a "legal scholar" as well as antitrust legal expert.

Scholarly law journals and law books cite his articles.

== Works ==
- "Voluntary Compliance Programs" (1970)
- "Price Fixing – Proof and Inference" (1971)
- "Alternative Courses of Action Available to Persons Injured Under the Antitrust Laws" (1973)
- "Prophylactic Antitrust" (1982)
- "The Predatory Pricing Controversy: Academic Theories Enter the Courtroom" (1982)
- "Trade and Professional Associations: An Overview of Horizontal Restraints" (1984)
- "Health Care: Current Antitrust Issues" (1993)
- "Health Care Under the Antitrust Guidelines" (1995)
- "Vertical Restraints" (1996)

== External sources ==
- "Murray S. Monroe: 1925–2003". CBA Bar Report. January 2004.
