= DuPont v. Kolon Industries =

Intellectual property lawsuit

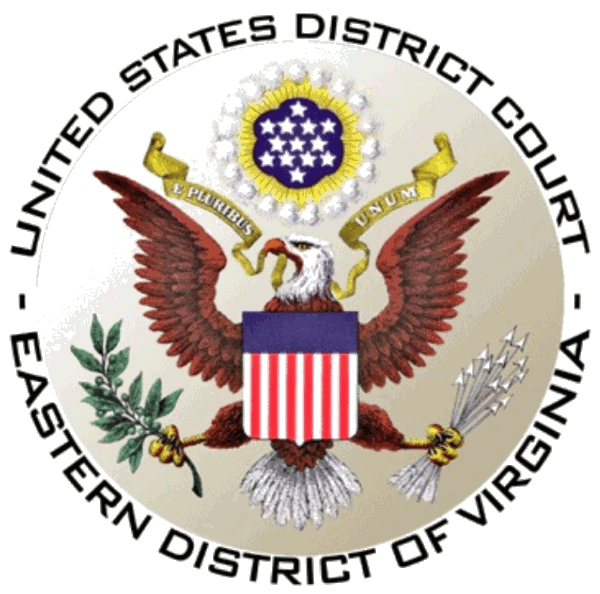
- Court: United States District Court for the Eastern District of Virginia
- Full case name: E. I. Du Pont De Nemours and Company v. Kolon Industries, Incorporated
- Decided: September 14, 2011
- Docket nos.: 3:09-cv-00058

Case history
- Prior actions: Counterclaims dismissed, 683 F. Supp. 2d 401, 688 F. Supp. 2d 443 (E.D. Va. 2009); reversed, E.I. DuPont de Nemours & Co. v. Kolon Indus., Inc., 637 F.3d 435 (4th Cir. 2011); spoliation motion granted, 803 F. Supp. 2d 469 (E.D. Va. 2011).
- Subsequent actions: Permanent injunction granted, 894 F. Supp. 2d 691 (E.D. Va. 2012); dismissal of antitrust counterclaims affirmed, 748 F.3d 160 (4th Cir. 2014); cert. denied, 135 S. Ct. 437 (2014); verdict reversed, E.I. DuPont De Nemours & Co. v. Kolon Indus., Inc., 564 F. App'x 710 (4th Cir. 2014); cert. denied, 135 S. Ct. 439 (2014).

Court membership
- Judge sitting: Robert E. Payne

DuPont v. Kolon Industries is an intellectual property lawsuit centering on the allegation that Kolon Industries (of 코오롱그룹), a South Korea-based company, stole trade secrets concerning the production and marketing of Kevlar from DuPont, an American chemical company. Kevlar is a high strength synthetic fiber used in applications as diverse as bicycle tires and body armor. On September 14, 2011, a jury found in favour of DuPont and awarded damages of $919.9 million. A 2015 settlement reduced the damages to $275 million.

== Background ==
Kevlar is a registered trademark for a para-aramid synthetic fiber developed at DuPont in 1965 and used commercially from the early 1970s onwards. On February 3, 2009, DuPont filed suit against Kolon for "theft of trade secrets and confidential information" relating to its product, Heracron. The suit alleged that Michael Mitchell, a Kolon employee who formerly worked at DuPont, had "retained certain highly confidential information on his home computer" that he illegally passed to his new employer. Following an investigation by the Federal Bureau of Investigation, Mitchell pleaded guilty to the theft of trade secrets and was sentenced to 18 months imprisonment in March 2010.

== Destruction of evidence ==
On July 21, 2011, the court found that Kolon had intentionally destroyed relevant evidence. Kolon was sanctioned for this behavior when evidence was produced of screenshots showing explicit instructions to delete potentially relevant emails and documents in violation of litigation holds supposedly in effect. According to a forensic analyst acting for DuPont at least 17,811 files and emails were deleted, many of which were deemed relevant to the case. As a result of this finding the jury was given an adverse inference instruction, and Kolon was ordered to pay DuPont's costs in connection with the motion. District Judge Robert E. Payne explained that "the actions taken by the key employees discussed herein were intentional, in bad faith and quite serious."

== Judgment and reactions ==
On September 14, 2011, a jury in the U.S. District Court for the Eastern District of Virginia found in favor of DuPont which was awarded damages of $919.9 million. Kolon announced that it intended to appeal and described the judgment as "the result of a multiyear campaign by DuPont aimed at forcing Kolon out of the aramid fiber market", adding "Kolon had no need for and did not solicit any trade secrets or proprietary information of DuPont, and had no reason to believe that the consultants it engaged were providing such information. Indeed, many of the 'secrets' alleged in this case are public knowledge." It also confirmed that it intended to continue a retaliatory antitrust case alleging monopolistic practices on the part of DuPont.

Thomas G. Powell, President of DuPont Protection Technologies, said "The size of this award is one of the largest in defense of business processes and technologies. It also sends a message to potential thieves of intellectual property that DuPont will pursue all legal remedies to protect our significant investment in research and development and our proprietary information for the benefit of our shareholders and customers... Not only are the technologies and processes of Kevlar important to DuPont, but also to the thousands of soldiers, law enforcement officers and first responders globally whose lives Kevlar protects." In a press release DuPont further stated that it intended to seek the award of costs and injunctive relief, requiring Kolon to return the stolen information and cease production of products made using the information.

== Appeal and settlement ==
In 2014, a federal appeals court overturned the 2011 verdict. On April 30, 2015, Kolon Industries settled and agreed to pay $275 million in damages to DuPont. The company also pleaded guilty to a federal charge of conspiracy to convert trade secrets, for which they will pay $85 million in criminal fines.
