= Stephanie Soechtig =

American director and filmmaker

- Born: New York
- Education: BA Broadcast Journalism New York University
- Known for: Tapped; Fed Up (2014); The Devil We Know

Stephanie Soechtig is an American director and filmmaker who is known for documentaries such as Tapped (2009), Fed Up (2014), Under the Gun (2016) and The Devil We Know (2018).

== Education ==
Soechtig earned her BA in Broadcast Journalism from the New York University. She later studied at Western Connecticut State University.

== Career ==
Soechtig was a co-founder of Atlas Films, a production company that produced documentary films on social issues, along with Michael Walrath and his wife, Michelle Walrath. They produced Tapped in 2009, which she co-directed with Jason Lindsey. She directed, wrote and produced the feature length documentary film, Fed Up, in 2014. Soechtig directed Under the Gun in collaboration with Katie Couric, who also worked with her on Tapped and Fed Up. Under the Gun was a "Sundance favorite". According to The Guardian, it provided an "in-depth look at the ways gun control advocates have tried to counteract the power of the National Rifle Association."

== Awards ==
Soechtig won the Vancouver International Film Festival (VIFF) Impact award for her documentary The Devil We Know in 2018. The VIFF cited Dennis Harvey, Variety as saying that Soechtig "presents an unusually engrossing documentary for this type of subject, with human interest always in the forefront despite the complex timeline of events, issues and information presented." She "presides over an expert assembly that’s sharp in every department."
