= John Nalbandian =

American judge (born 1969)

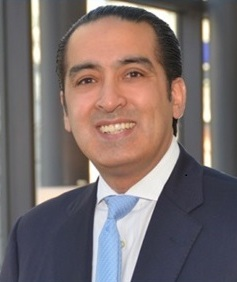

Judge of the United States Court of Appeals for the Sixth Circuit
- Incumbent
- Assumed office May 17, 2018
- Appointed by: Donald Trump
- Preceded by: John M. Rogers

Personal details
- Born: John Baylor Nalbandian; 1969 (age 56–57) Fort Ord, California, U.S.
- Party: Republican
- Spouse: Caroline May (m. 1994)
- Children: 2
- Education: University of Pennsylvania (BS); University of Virginia (JD)

John Baylor Nalbandian (born 1969) is a United States circuit judge of the United States Court of Appeals for the Sixth Circuit. He was previously a partner in the Cincinnati office of Taft Stettinius & Hollister.

== Biography ==
Nalbandian received his Bachelor of Science from the Wharton School of the University of Pennsylvania and his Juris Doctor from the University of Virginia School of Law with the Order of the Coif honor.

At the start of his legal career Nalbandian served as a law clerk to Judge Jerry Edwin Smith of the United States Court of Appeals for the Fifth Circuit. He then went on to be an associate at Jones Day, where he practiced for five years. In 2000, he joined Taft Stettinius & Hollister in Cincinnati and eventually became a partner, where he continued to work until becoming a judge.

Nalbandian was appointed by Kentucky Governor Ernie Fletcher to serve as a Special Justice of the Kentucky Supreme Court in 2007. In June 2010, he was nominated by President Barack Obama and confirmed by the Senate to be a board member of the State Justice Institute to fill Keith McNamara's seat, serving until July 11, 2018. He resigned his seat on the Board of Directors on July 11, 2018. He was a member of the Magistrate Judge Merit Selection Panel for the United States District Court for the Eastern District of Kentucky. He has been a member of the Federalist Society since 1991.

== Federal judicial service ==
On January 23, 2018, President Donald Trump announced his intent to nominate Nalbandian to an undetermined seat on the United States Court of Appeals for the Sixth Circuit. On January 24, 2018, his nomination was sent to the United States Senate. He was nominated to the seat being vacated by Judge John M. Rogers, who announced his intention to assume senior status on a date to be determined. On March 7, 2018, a hearing on his nomination was held before the Senate Judiciary Committee. On April 19, 2018, his nomination was reported out of committee by an 11–10 vote. On May 11, 2018 the Senate invoked cloture on his nomination by a 52–43 vote. On May 15, 2018, his nomination was confirmed by a 53–45 vote. He received his commission on May 17, 2018.

== Personal life ==
Nalbandian's mother was born in a Japanese American internment camp during World War II. He married Caroline May in 1994.

== Notable Cases ==
Judge Nalbandian has notable cases in the areas of federal sentencing, civil procedure, and class actions.

- CIC Services LLC v. IRS, 925 F.3d 247 (6th Cir. 2019) (Nalbandian, J., dissenting), rev'd, 593 U.S. 209 (2021).
- Crawford v. Tilley, 15 F.4th 752 (6th Cir. 2021).
- United States v. Tomes, 990 F.3d 500 (6th Cir. 2021).
- United States v. McCall, 56 F.4th 1048 (6th Cir. 2022).
- Allstates Refractory Contractors, LLC v. Su, 79 F.4th 755 (6th Cir. 2023) (Nalbandian, J., dissenting).
- Tennessee v. Dep't of Educ., 104 F.4th 577 (6th Cir. 2024).
- Bowles v. Sabree, 121 F.4th 539 (6th Cir. 2024).
- Friends of George's, Inc. v. Mulroy, 108 F.4th 431 (6th Cir. 2024).
- United States v. Sittenfeld, 128 F.4th 752 (6th Cir. 2025).
- Salazar v. Paramount Global, 133 F.4th 642 (6th Cir. 2025).

== See also ==
- List of Asian American jurists

Legal offices
| Preceded by John M. Rogers | Judge of the United States Court of Appeals for the Sixth Circuit; 2018–present | Incumbent |
