= Fed Up (film) =

2014 documentary film by Stephanie Soechting

- Theatrical poster
- Directed by: Stephanie Soechtig
- Written by: Stephanie Soechtig; Mark Monroe
- Produced by: Stephanie Soechtig; Sarah Olson; Eve Marson
- Narrated by: Katie Couric
- Cinematography: Scott Sinkler
- Edited by: Brian David Lazarte; Tina Nguyen; Dan Swietlik
- Music by: Michael Brook
- Production companies: Atlas Films; Diamond Docs; Artemis Rising Foundation
- Distributed by: RADiUS-TWC
- Release dates: January 19, 2014 (Sundance); May 9, 2014 (United States)
- Running time: 92 minutes
- Country: United States
- Language: English
- Box office: $1.5 million

Fed Up is a 2014 American documentary film directed, written and produced by Stephanie Soechtig. The film focuses on the causes of obesity in the US, presenting evidence showing large quantities of sugar in processed foods are an overlooked root of the problem, and points to the monied lobbying power of "Big Sugar" in blocking attempts to enact policies to address the issue.

== Synopsis ==
Fed Up shows how the first dietary guidelines issued by the U.S. government in the early 1980's overlooked the role of dietary sugar in increasing risks of obesity, diabetes, and associated ill-health outcomes, particularly in children. Since these guidelines effectively condoned the unlimited addition of sugar to foods consumed by children, sugar consumption has greatly increased, obesity has skyrocketed, and generations of children have grown up far more vulnerable to these complications than their parents. These children face impaired health and shorter lifespans as a result. As the relationship between the high-sugar diet and poor health has emerged, sugar industry interests with almost unlimited financial lobbying resources have nullified attempts by parents, schools, states, and in Congress to provide a healthier diet for children. The film concludes with a list of 20 companies, industry groups and politicians who refused to talk to the filmmakers.

== Production, premiere and release ==
The director, Stephanie Soechtig, said she followed some of the families struggling mightily with obesity, diabetes and other health issues for more than two years during the making of the film. American journalist and TV personality Katie Couric co-produced the documentary and is its narrator. The film premiered in competition category of U.S. Documentary Competition program at the 2014 Sundance Film Festival on January 19, 2014.

After its premiere at the 2014 Sundance Film Festival, RADiUS-TWC acquired distribution rights of the film. The film was released on May 9, 2014, in the United States.

== Reception ==
Fed Up received a positive response from critics. Review aggregator Rotten Tomatoes reports 80% of 66 film critics have given the film a positive review, with a rating average of 7 out of 10.

In her review for LA Weekly, Amy Nicholson praised the film by saying "Fed Up is poised to be the Inconvenient Truth of the health movement. (Which makes sense - producer Laurie David worked on both.)" Geoffrey Berkshire in his review for Variety said "Stephanie Soechtig's documentary effectively gets the message out about America's addiction to unhealthy food." Robert Cameron Fowler from Indiewire in his review said "'Fed Up' is a glossy package that gets its warnings across loud and clear: we need to change what we eat."

Justin Lowe of The Hollywood Reporter praises the film as highly relevant, though overly-detailed—the "Highly relevant film diminishes its central message with distracting details."

As Manohla Dargis succinctly summarizes in her review for The New York Times:

Recent research ... indicates calories in fruit are not the same as those in soda, a conclusion that is part of the big picture in "Fed Up," a very good advocacy documentary ... A whirlwind of talking heads, found footage, scary statistics and cartoonish graphics, the movie is a fast, coolly incensed investigation into why people are getting fatter. It also includes some touching video self-portraits by some young people who belong to the almost 17 percent of children and adolescents, 2 to 19, who are considered obese.

== Criticism ==
The documentary has been criticized by multiple Physicians and scientists as misrepresentative of scientific evidence in multiple occasions. The film makes the claim that drinking one soda a day will increase a child's chance of becoming obese by 60%. The scientists who are the authors of the study this statistic comes from state they cannot prove this causality, as the film claims, only an association.

Harriet Hall, writing in Science-Based Medicine, noted how the film's selection of experts consists mainly of politicians and journalists with few relevant nutritional scientists or doctors. She also argues the definitive pronouncements the film makes about the role of sugar are premature as there are too many other possible confounders such as lifestyle, total calorie consumption and the type of foods being eaten. Hall also goes on to provide a comprehensive list of statements in the film not based on scientific evidence. She concludes by saying "the film will undoubtedly do some good by helping raise public awareness of childhood obesity" but wishes "it could have done so without misrepresenting the facts".

== See also ==
- List of films featuring diabetes
