= The Devil We Know =

2018 documentary film by Stephanie Soechtig

- Poster
- Directed by: Stephanie Soechtig; Jeremy Seifert
- Written by: Stephanie Soechtig; Mark Monroe
- Produced by: Stephanie Soechtig
- Cinematography: Rod Hassler
- Edited by: Brian David Lazarte; James Leche; Dan Reed
- Music by: Brian Tyler
- Production company: Cinetic Media
- Release date: January 21, 2018 (Sundance Film Festival)
- Running time: 95 minutes
- Country: United States
- Language: English

The Devil We Know is a 2018 investigative documentary film by director Stephanie Soechtig regarding allegations of health hazards from perfluorooctanoic acid (PFOA, also known as C8), a key ingredient used in manufacturing Teflon, and DuPont's potential responsibility. PFAS are commonly found in every household, and in products as diverse as non-stick cookware, stain resistant furniture and carpets, wrinkle free and water repellant clothing, cosmetics, lubricants, paint, pizza boxes, popcorn bags, and many other everyday products.

Two of the most common types (PFOS and PFOA) were phased out of production in the United States (US) in 2002 and 2015 respectively, but are still present in some imported products, and were replaced by the similarly toxic GenX in Teflon products. PFOA and PFOS are found in every American person’s blood stream in the parts per billion range, though those concentrations have decreased by 70% for PFOA and 84% for PFOS between 1999 and 2014, which coincides with the end of the production and phase out of PFOA and PFOS in the US.

The film premiered at the 2018 Sundance Film Festival. The director, Soechtig, has also produced similar documentary exposés including Tapped (2009), about the pollution caused by bottled water, Fed Up (2014), dealing with the obesity-promoting food industry, and Under the Gun (2016), about the gun lobby. The documentary was also shown on BBC Four in November 2018 as Poisoning America – The Devil We Know as part of the BBC Storyville documentary series.

== Synopsis ==
The story centers on Parkersburg, West Virginia, where the DuPont facility that manufactured Teflon was located and follows the personal stories and tribulations of several people who worked at the facility. The film includes footage of public hearings, news reports and corporate ads, along with input from scientists and activists. The film's title refers to an internal DuPont memorandum of sticking with "the devil we know" in the continued use of perfluorooctanoic acid (PFOA), rather than spending funds to develop a safer alternative.

Teflon was originally created in 1945, and soon found its way into products including stain-resistant carpets, carpet-cleaning liquids, microwave popcorn bags, outdoor furniture, baking pans, and frying pans. 3M originally created the PFOA compound, the key substance in Teflon, before selling it to DuPont. Despite a memorandum from 3M to specifically avoid dumping the substance into water, DuPont "dumped, poured and released" at least 1.7 million pounds of PFOA between 1951 and 2003.

After DuPont began dumping PFOA into the water, local farmer Wilbur Tennant's cattle began dying off, though he was unaware of the cause. Their teeth would turn black, and calves would be born with very specific facial deformities. Ken Wamsley, a Parkersburg resident, says in the film that his neighbors began reporting that their children's teeth were turning black. Sue Bailey, one of two women working at the Parkersburg DuPont facility, gave birth to a son, Bucky, who suffered the same type of facial deformity as that of Tennant's cattle. The other female DuPont worker, not shown but mentioned in the documentary, gave birth to a child with deformities as well. Ken Wamsley relates to how at least fifteen of his DuPont colleagues all died of cancer, specifically testicular, thyroid and rectal cancer - in the years since, studies have shown a correlation between high PFOA exposure and six health outcomes: kidney cancer, testicular cancer, ulcerative colitis, thyroid disease, hypercholesterolemia (high cholesterol), and pregnancy-induced hypertension.

Footage of Charles O. Holliday, the CEO of DuPont at the time, Bruce Karrh, DuPont's corporate medical director, and Kathleen Forte, DuPont's public relations officer, is shown where they admit knowingly polluting the local water. DuPont had been conducting its own medical studies for more than four decades, which had shown that PFOA caused cancerous testicular, pancreatic and liver tumors in lab animals.

The documentary touches on the detection of PFOA in the blood of more than 98% of the general US population in the low and sub-parts per billion (ppb) range, with levels much higher in chemical plant employees and surrounding subpopulations. The only samples clean of PFOA were found in US Army blood samples taken at the beginning of the Korean War in 1950.

== See also ==
- Dark Waters (2019 film)
- Perfluorooctanoic acid
- GenX
