= Sharon Lerner =

American investigative reporter

- Citizenship: American
- Education: Brown University; Columbia University
- Occupations: Investigative reporter, environmental journalist

Sharon Lerner is an American investigative reporter and environmental journalist.

== Education ==
Lerner earned her undergraduate degree from Brown University and her master’s degree in public health from Columbia University.

== Career ==
=== The Intercept ===
Lerner was an environmental crime reporter at The Intercept from 2015 to 2022. Her reporting on PFOA, a chemical in teflon, was part of a series called "The Teflon Toxin" and was featured in the film The Devil We Know. She wrote in depth about PFAS, breaking the story about PFAS presence in firefighting foam. Her work was cited in the Stockholm Convention on Persistent Organic Pollutants decision to limit international use of PFAS, as well as in US Congressional Hearings. Lerner also covered the US-funded virus work in Wuhan, China, as related to the COVID-19 pandemic.

=== ProPublica ===
Lerner has worked at ProPublica since 2022. She has covered the 2023 Ohio train derailment incident as well as continuing to report on chemical pollutants.

== Awards ==
Lerner has been honored by the Society of Environmental Journalists eleven times. Lerner was awarded the Izzy Award in 2018 for her work on covering science, health, and the environment. She was the Newswomen's Club of New York Journalist of the Year in 2021.

== Publications ==
- Lerner, Sharon (April 1, 2010). The War On Moms. Trade Paper Press.
- Lerner, Sharon, "You Make Me Sick: How corporate scientists discovered – and then helped to conceal – the dangers of forever chemicals", The New Yorker, 27 May 2024, pp. 38–47.
