= Tapped (film) =

- Directed by: Stephanie Soechtig; Jason Lindsey
- Written by: Josh David; Stephanie Soechtig; Jason Lindsey
- Produced by: Sarah Gibson; Stephanie Soechtig
- Cinematography: Adam Dubrowa; Michael Millikan
- Edited by: Jason Lindsey
- Music by: Jason Brandt
- Production company: Atlas Films (III)
- Distributed by: Gravitas Ventures
- Release dates: May 2009 (Los Angeles United Film Festival); July 31, 2009 (United States)
- Running time: 76 minutes
- Country: United States
- Language: English

Tapped is a 2009 documentary film by directors Stephanie Soechtig and Jason Lindsey. The two began the documentary after research into ocean pollution "kept leading them to bottled water".

== Synopsis ==
Tapped looks into the bottled water industry and its long-term effects socially, economically and ecologically. The filmmakers focused on industry giants such as PepsiCo and Nestlé Waters, visiting a town containing a Nestlé factory as well as running tests on the bottles the company uses for its products. Their results came back showing "several potentially harmful chemicals, some known carcinogens". The documentary also focused on the number of bottles that are recycled, noting that "Forty percent of bottled water is really just filtered tap water, and every day we throw away 30 million single-served bottles of water as plastic waste."

== Reception ==
Grist wrote "A few too many mid-interview cutaways to Soechtig looking concerned came off as a little journalistically self-important, but Tapped does a solid job of covering every aspect of this damaging industry and inspiring more outrage than despair." The Los Angeles Times praised the film, stating that the film was "persuasive" and a "compact, clear-headed documentary". NPR's Glenn McDonald praised the film but criticized some of the editing done to "ridicule industry spokespeople", stating that it was unnecessary as the film's content "sells itself".

=== Response by bottling companies ===
President and CEO of Nestlé Waters North America (until 2013) Kim Jeffery responded to several of the questions brought up by the film, stating that the bottles used for the products were safe and that one of the chemicals discovered in the tests, bisphenol A was "in the liners of all canned foods to prevent botulism, and in the DVDs of the documentary that people were able to purchase".

== Awards and accolades ==
- Anchorage International Film Festival 2009 - Best Documentary
- Eugene International Film Festival 2009 - Best Documentary
