= The Intercept =

US online nonprofit news outlet

- Screenshot
- Website type: News website
- Available in: English; Portuguese
- Revenue: $5.6 million (2024)
- Website: theintercept.com
- Commercial: No
- Launched: February 10, 2014; 12 years ago

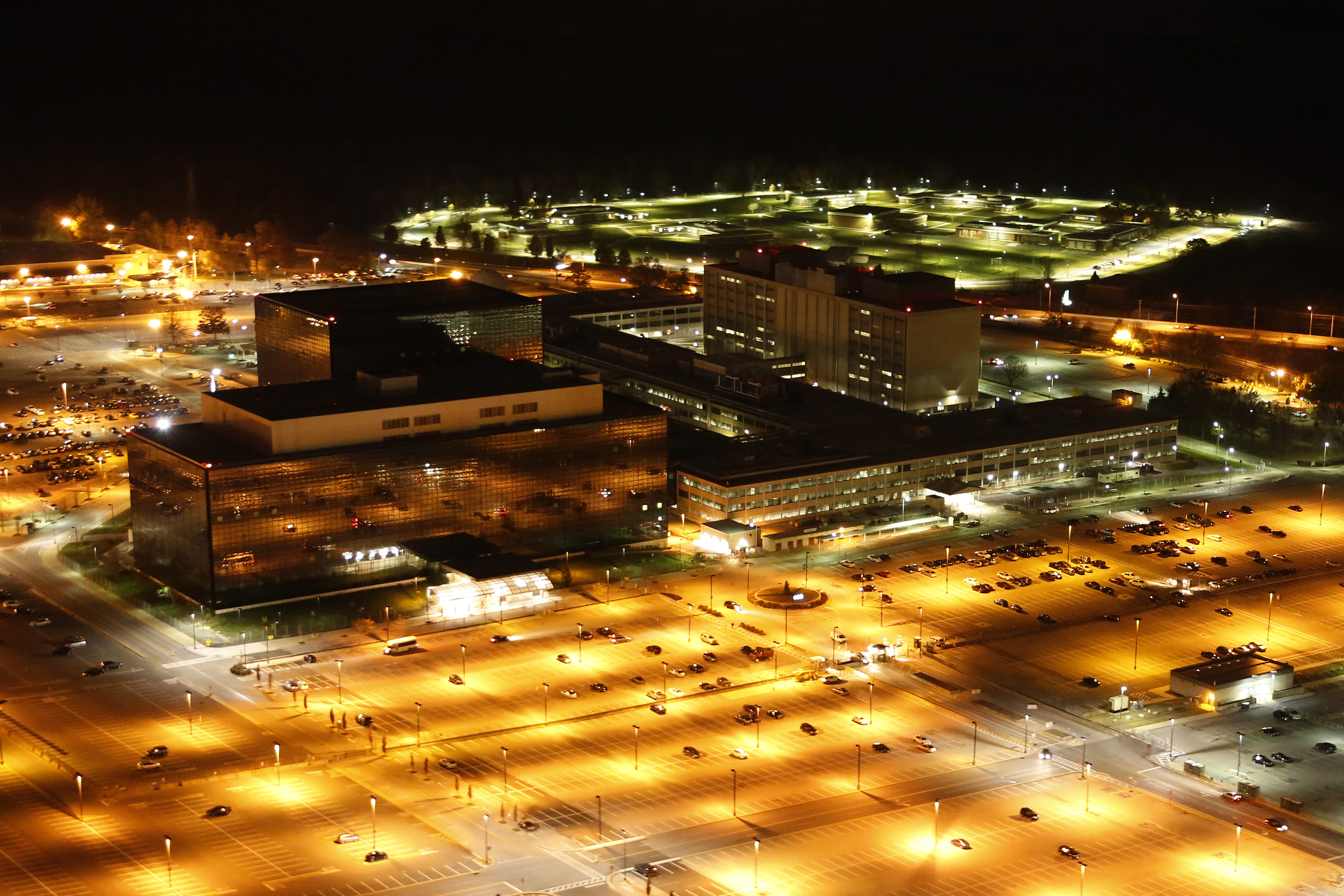
Photograph by Trevor Paglen of the National Security Agency headquarters in Fort Meade first published in The Intercept

The Intercept is an American left-wing and progressive nonprofit news organization that publishes articles and podcasts online. The Intercept has published in English since its founding in 2014, and in Portuguese since the 2016 launch of the Brazilian edition. It has been noted for its pro-Palestinian coverage.

== History ==
=== 2014–2022: Founding, early years ===
The Intercept was founded by journalists Glenn Greenwald, Jeremy Scahill, and Laura Poitras. It was launched on February 10, 2014, by First Look Media with $250 million in pledged funding by billionaire eBay co-founder Pierre Omidyar. The publication initially reported on documents released by Edward Snowden. Co-founders Greenwald and Poitras left in 2020 amid public disagreements about the leadership and direction of the organization.

A Brazilian version of the site, Intercept Brasil, launched in August 2016. The site featured both original reporting in Portuguese as well as features from the main Intercept site translated into Portuguese. The newsrooms for The Intercept and its Brazilian counterpart were editorially independent. In 2019, Intercept Brasil published Vaza Jato ("Car Wash Leaks"), messages demonstrating collaboration on illegal acts among former judge Sergio Moro, prosecutor Deltan Dallagnol, and others as part of Operation Car Wash. Intercept Brasil spun off as an independent organization in October 2022.

==== Resignation of Glenn Greenwald ====
On October 29, 2020, Glenn Greenwald resigned from The Intercept, saying that he faced political censorship and contractual breaches from the editors, who he wrote had prevented publication of his "The Real Scandal: U.S. Media Uses Falsehoods to Defend Joe Biden From Hunter's Emails" article on coverage of the Hunter Biden laptop controversy; Greenwald pivoted to Substack to publish it independently. On The Joe Rogan Experience, Greenwald stated that he thinks his colleagues did not want to report anything negative about Joe Biden because they were desperate for Trump to lose. The Intercept disputed Greenwald's accusations, writing, without evidence, that he "believes that anyone who disagrees with him is corrupt, and anyone who presumes to edit his words is a censor", and told The Washington Post, "it is absolutely not true that Glenn Greenwald was asked to remove all sections critical of Joe Biden from his article. He was asked to support his claims and innuendo about corrupt actions by Joe Biden with evidence." Greenwald published his email exchange with The Intercept, which, he said, showed his article on Joe Biden was censored and refuted the claims above.

=== 2023–present: Independent organization ===
In January 2023, The Intercept was spun off from the First Look Institute (the nonprofit arm of First Look Media) as an independent nonprofit organization. Reporting from The Intercept exposed significant sourcing issues with the influential December 2023 New York Times article "Screams Without Words", which alleged that Hamas perpetrated systematic sexual violence during the October 7 attacks. The investigation demonstrated how two inexperienced freelancers in Israel had done the majority of reporting work for the New York Times story, raising concerns about its editorial process and credibility. In follow-up reporting, The Intercept confirmed that The New York Times had withheld an episode of its podcast The Daily related to "Screams Without Words" due to internal debate about the veracity of the publication's original reporting. In February 2024, The New York Times began an internal investigation into the source of leaks to The Intercept.

In February 2024, The Intercept laid off 16 staff members, one-third of its newsroom. In April 2024 the outlet fired William Arkin, and Ken Klippenstein resigned in protest. Later that month, Semafor reported that The Intercept was running out of money "and facing its own bitter civil war, with multiple feuding factions battling for power and two star journalists trying to take control".

In February 2024, The Intercept filed a lawsuit against OpenAI regarding the unauthorized use of journalists' work to train ChatGPT. The lawsuit focused on a provision of the Digital Millennium Copyright Act (DMCA) not previously explored in the legal disputes between news organizations and AI companies. One year later, a federal court upheld part of the suit and overruled OpenAI's attempt to dismiss the case, though claims against Microsoft were dismissed. The ruling demonstrated that the DMCA can provide protections for news organizations against AI companies' unauthorized use of digital content, regardless of whether that content has been registered with the U.S. Copyright Office.

In June 2024, the unionized staff of The Intercept asked the group's board of directors to terminate the organization's CEO Annie Chabel and Chief Strategy Officer Sumi Aggarwal, commit to restructuring the business, and provide transparency into conversations with donors. The next month, Jeremy Scahill and Ryan Grim left The Intercept to found their own news website, Drop Site News, with some funding at launch from The Intercept. The Intercept continued to publish the Intercepted and Deconstructed podcasts.

In February 2025, The Intercept published Elon Musk's government email address, which had not been previously reported, and filed more than a dozen related Freedom of Information Act requests. The Intercept reported on a bill introduced in September 2025 that would give the Secretary of State power to revoke the passport of a U.S. citizen based on their beliefs or speech. Within days, public outrage led Rep. Brian Mast, who had introduced the bill, to backtrack on the proposal. That same month, The Intercept was the first news organization to report that the U.S. attacked an alleged drug boat multiple times, known as a double tap strike, in order to kill survivors of its first attack. In November 2025, The Intercept reported that in response to U.S. Department of State sanctions, YouTube had deleted more than 700 videos from three major Palestinian human rights organizations documenting alleged human rights violations by Israel.

In late 2025, The Intercept was among the first outlets to detail the case of a retired police officer in Tennessee who was jailed for more than a month because of a meme he posted on Facebook in the wake of the assassination of Charlie Kirk. An investigation by The Intercept found no evidence that anyone in the public had expressed concern about danger in response to the meme, contradicting the claims of the county sheriff whose office arrested the man. The story drew widespread attention; within a week, the man was released and charges were dropped.

In March 2026, NYC Health + Hospitals canceled a contract with Palantir following reporting from The Intercept sharing details of the contract and showing almost $4 million in payments since November 2023.

== Activities ==
=== Edward Snowden reporting and archives ===
In its early years, The Intercept published extensive investigations on the Snowden disclosures' revelations about surveillance activity in the U.S. and globally. In March 2014, Der Spiegel and The Intercept jointly reported on a list of world leaders, including German chancellor Angela Merkel, subject to U.S. National Security Agency (NSA) surveillance. Five months later, The Intercept shared details on ICREACH, the NSA's search engine giving access to hundreds of millions of records about both American citizens and non-Americans to 23 U.S. governmental agencies, including the CIA and FBI.

In July 2014, The Intercept reported how the British spy agency Government Communication Headquarters (GCHQ) was covertly manipulating internet content and activity with tactics like artificially increasing website traffic and interfering with online polls. The Intercept also alleged that GCHQ used Regin malware in cyberattacks on Belgacom and other EU computer systems. In February 2015, The Intercept reported that the NSA and GCHQ had hacked French-Dutch digital security company Gemalto in order to surveil calls and data secretly, an apparent violation of international law. A follow-up in June 2015 detailed how GCHQ's Joint Threat Research Intelligence Group worked to discredit specific targets online through the use of impersonation, fake websites, YouTube videos, and other tools. A story in September 2015 covered Karma Police, GCHQ's surveillance program established seven years earlier to record the search, browsing, and chat activities of every internet user with the goal of identifying patterns and relationships rather than targeting specific users.

The Intercept had hosted an archive of documents leaked by Snowden to Greenwald and Poitras. First Look deprecated the archive and laid off its associated research team in 2019, saying that their editorial priorities had changed and that they no longer reported from the archive. This marked the end of The Intercept's original vision of being a platform to report on the NSA disclosures. Barrett Brown burned the National Magazine Award he had received for his Intercept column in protest of First Look's decision to offline the Snowden archives.

=== Podcasts ===
==== Intercepted ====
Intercepted with Jeremy Scahill
- Genre: Talk

Cast and voices
- Hosted by: Jeremy Scahill

Publication
- Original release: January 25, 2017
- Provider: First Look Media

Related
- Website: theintercept.com/podcasts/

Intercepted was a weekly podcast hosted by investigative journalist Jeremy Scahill and produced by First Look Media. Intercepted was launched on January 25, 2017. It regularly featured The Intercept editor and journalist Glenn Greenwald as well as senior correspondent, author, and journalist Naomi Klein. The editor-in-chief was Betsy Reed. Music for the show was created and performed by DJ Spooky. The last episode was July 3, 2024. It was replaced by The Intercept Briefing.

The premiere episode, on January 25, 2017, "The Clock Strikes Thirteen, Donald Trump is President" featured an interview with Seymour Hersh, who criticizes the media's response to the alleged Russian hacking of the 2016 U.S. presidential election, calling the way the media went along with the story, "outrageous".

==== Deconstructed ====
Deconstructed is a podcast hosted by The Intercept's Washington, D.C. bureau chief Ryan Grim. The show was previously hosted by British political journalist and broadcaster Mehdi Hasan for its first two years, from 2018 to 2020. Grim took over as permanent host in October 2020 when Hasan began hosting a news broadcast for Peacock.

==== Somebody ====
Somebody is a seven-part investigative podcast about what happened to Courtney Copeland, a gunshot victim who died after being found outside a Chicago Police station. Copeland's mother, Shapearl Wells, narrates the podcast, released in 2020.

=== Intercept Brasil ===
In August 2016, The Intercept launched a Brazilian version, The Intercept Brasil (later renamed Intercept Brasil). In June 2019, Intercept Brasil released leaked Telegram messages exchanged between judge Sergio Moro, prosecutor Deltan Dallagnol and other Operation Car Wash prosecutors. In the wake of the reporting, the Brazilian government in January 2020 indicted Glenn Greenwald on cybercrime charges in connection with his efforts to protect his sources, the legitimacy of President Jair Bolsonaro's election was called into question, and the Supreme Federal Court of Brazil in April–June 2021 annulled former President Luiz Inácio Lula da Silva's 2018 conviction on corruption charges.

Some suspect that Intercept Brasil is funded by the criminal organization Primeiro Comando da Capital based on a citation of "The Intercept Brasil" on an accountability for the PCC found in the Operation Sequaz, Intercept Brasil denies those claims.

=== Juan M. Thompson scandal ===
In February 2016, the site appended lengthy corrections to five stories by reporter Juan M. Thompson and retracted a sixth, about Charleston church shooter Dylann Roof, written over the previous year, focused on the African-American community. Shortly afterward, a note from editor Betsy Reed indicated that Thompson had been fired recently after his editors discovered "a pattern of deception" in his reporting. According to Reed, he had "fabricated several quotes in his stories and created fake email accounts that he used to impersonate people, one of which was a Gmail account in my name".

Reed apologized to readers and to those misquoted. She noted that some of Thompson's work, most of it using public sources, was verifiable. Editors alerted any downstream users of the affected stories, and promised to take similar action if further fabrication came to light.

Thompson suggested that the greater problem was racism in the media field. He had made up pseudonyms for some of his sources, whom he described as "poor black people who didn't want their names in the public given the situations" and would not have spoken with a reporter otherwise. "[T]he journalism that covers the experiences of poor black folk and the journalism others, such as you and First Look, are used to differs drastically", he argued. He also said he had felt a need to "exaggerate my personal shit in order to prove my worth" at The Intercept given incidents of racial bias he said he had witnessed there. When Gawker published his email, Reed said those allegations had not been in the version he sent her.

He was fired by The Intercept in early 2016 and, according to Reed, did not cooperate with the investigation into his actions.

=== Reality Winner controversy ===
On June 5, 2017, The Intercept published a classified NSA report detailing Russian military intelligence efforts to compromise US election infrastructure ahead of the 2016 United States presidential election. According to the report, Russian operatives attempted to obtain login credentials from employees of an American voter registration and poll software company, compromising at least one account. They subsequently impersonated the vendor in spear-phishing emails sent to 122 addresses associated with local government organizations involved in election administration.

The document was mailed from a source inside the NSA, who did not reveal their identity to Intercept writers. One hour after publication, Reality Winner, a 25-year-old NSA contract employee, was arrested by the Federal Bureau of Investigation and charged under the Espionage Act of 1917. According to David Folkenflik of National Public Radio, "[a]n Intercept reporter shared a photo of the papers with a source, a government contractor whom he trusted, seeking to validate it. The printout included a postmark of Augusta, Ga., and microdots, a kind of computerized fingerprint. The contractor told his bosses, who informed the FBI." NSA quickly identified the leaker of the documents.

Verifying the legitimacy of leaked documents is common journalism practice, as is protecting third parties who may be harmed incidentally by the leak being published. However, professional media outlets who receive documents or recordings from confidential sources do not, as a practice, share the unfiltered primary evidence with a federal agency for review or verification, as it is known that metadata and unique identifiers may be revealed that were not obvious to the journalist, and the source exposed.

According to the FBI, the evidence chain led to the arrest of Winner, a young Air Force veteran who was working in Georgia for Pluribus International Corporation, an NSA contractor, when the document was mailed to The Intercept. The Intercept was criticized for unprofessional handling of the document and indifference to the source's safety.

Following the arrest of Winner, The Intercept released a statement saying it had "no knowledge of the identity of the person who provided us with the document". Allegations from the FBI about Winner, it added, were "unproven assertions and speculation designed to serve the government's agenda and as such warrant skepticism".

CIA whistleblower John Kiriakou and Guantanamo Bay detention camp whistleblower Joseph Hickman both accused Matthew Cole, the same reporter accused of revealing Winner's identity, of playing a role in their exposure, which, in Kiriakou's case, led to his imprisonment.

On July 11, 2017, The Intercept announced that its parent company, First Look Media, through its Press Freedom Defense Fund, would provide $50,000 in matching funds to Stand with Reality, a crowd-funding campaign to support Winner's legal defense, plus a separate grant to engage a second law firm to assist Winner's principal attorneys, Augusta-based Bell & Brigham. Additionally, editor-in-chief Betsy Reed said, "First Look's counsel Baruch Weiss of the firm Arnold & Porter Kaye Scholer may support the defense efforts while continuing to represent First Look's interests."

On August 23, 2018, at a federal court in Georgia, Winner was sentenced to the agreed-upon five years and three months in prison for violating the Espionage Act. Prosecutors said her sentence was the longest ever imposed in federal court for an unauthorized release of government information to the media. Winner was held at the Federal Bureau of Prisons (FBOP)'s Federal Medical Center, Carswell in Fort Worth, Texas, to receive treatment for bulimia and be close to her family.

Laura Poitras, one of the founding editors of The Intercept, prompted by the Winner controversy, expressed her concerns about source protection and accountability at The Intercept, and spoke to the press about them. Thereafter, she wrote that The Intercept chose to fire her "rather than to demote or seek the resignation of anyone responsible for the journalistic malpractice, cover-up, and retaliation".

== Finances ==
At launch, Omidyar pledged $250 million in funding. The non-profit arm of First Look Media budgeted $26 million in both 2017 and 2018, according to public filings, much allocated to The Intercept. High-profile journalists were well compensated, with Greenwald being paid $500,000 in 2015.

The Intercept was awarded a grant of $3.25 million from Sam Bankman-Fried, founder of the cryptocurrency exchange FTX. It had only received $500,000 when Bankman-Fried went bankrupt; the shortfall in funding "will leave The Intercept with a significant hole in its budget," according to its editor-in-chief.

Omidyar ceased financial support in 2022. First Look Media offered a $14 million grant when The Intercept spun off. In 2023, the CEO discussed a financial pivot to small donors and major gifts. Donations doubled from $488,000 to $867,000 from 2022 to 2023, but failed to meet expenses. Semafor reported in April 2024 that the organization was losing $300,000 per month. The organization led a fundraising campaign in April 2024 which resulted in 3,500 additional recurring donors.

== Reception ==
In August 2014, it was reported that U.S. military personnel had been banned from reading The Intercept. Erik Wemple, writing for The Washington Post, noted the conspicuous refusal of The Intercept to use the term "targeted killings" to refer to the U.S. drone program, instead referring to the drone strikes as "assassinations". Wemple included Glenn Greenwald's explanation that assassination is "the accurate term rather than the euphemistic term that the government wants us to use"; Greenwald further noted, "anyone who is murdered deliberately away from a battlefield for political purposes is being assassinated". TechCrunch referred to the story as clear evidence of "unabashed opposition to security hawks".

In February 2016, The Intercept won a National Magazine Award for columns and commentary by the writer Barrett Brown, and it was a finalist in the public interest category for a series by Sharon Lerner called the Teflon Toxin, which exposed how DuPont harmed the public and its workers with toxic chemicals. In April 2016, The Intercept won the People's Voice award for best news website at the twentieth annual Webby Awards. In May 2016, The Intercept won three awards at the New York Press Club Awards for Journalism. The site was awarded in the "special event reporting" category for its investigative reporting on the U.S. drone program, the "humor" category for a series of columns by the writer Barrett Brown, and the "documentary" category for a short film called, "The Surrender"—about the former U.S. intelligence analyst Stephen Jin-Woo Kim—produced by Stephen Maing, Laura Poitras, and Peter Maass. At the September 2016 Online News Awards, The Intercept won the University of Florida Award in Investigative Data Journalism for its Drone Papers series, an investigation of secret documents detailing a covert U.S. military overseas assassination program.

At the 2017 Online News Awards, The Intercept won two awards: the first for a feature story about the FBI's efforts to infiltrate the Bundy family, and the second, an investigative data journalism award for "Trial and Terror", a project documenting the people prosecuted in the U.S. for terrorism since 9/11. The same year, The Intercept won a Hillman Prize for Web Journalism for an investigative series by Jamie Kalven exposing criminality within the Chicago Police Department. The news organization also won a 2017 award for "Outstanding Feature Story" at the sixteenth annual Awards for Reporting on the Environment. Judges of the environmental award praised author Sharon Lerner for her piece "The Strange Case of Tennie White", which they described as a "finely written and disturbing investigation of contamination and injustice near a chemical plant in Mississippi".

In April 2024, Semafor reported that despite facing significant financial difficulties, The Intercept "is riding high among its readers for its aggressively pro-Palestinian coverage". In July 2025, Prism reported, "The Intercept has published bold reporting on Israel's occupation and genocide that seems conspicuously absent from other publications". It wrote that The Intercept's CEO Annie Chabel identified the organization's coverage of Israel and Palestine "as a principal reason behind the publication's inability to secure large donations from philanthropic foundations". Chabel said "specific funders have told her that The Intercept is 'biased on Israel-Palestine.'"

== See also ==
- Institute for Nonprofit News
