= Capital punishment in Bulgaria =

Europe holds the greatest concentration of abolitionist states (blue). Map current as of 2023 Abolished for all offences Abolished in practice Retains capital punishment

Capital punishment in Bulgaria was abolished on December 12, 1998 with the last execution, that of attempted saboteur Georgi Alinski, having been carried out on November 4, 1989. The Parliament of Bulgaria had introduced a moratorium on executions on July 7, 1990 and Protocol 6 of the European Convention on Human Rights came into force on October 1, 1999.

A 2016 poll found that 47% of Bulgarians were opposed to the Death Penaty, while 33% were in support.

== Notable executions in the 20th-century ==
=== Kingdom of Bulgaria ===
Executed person	Gender	Date of sentence	Date of execution	Place of execution	Crime	Method	Ref.
Marko Fridman	Male	1925	27 May 1925	Sofia	Communist terrorists participating in the St Nedelya Church assault	Hanging	
Petar Zadgorski	Male	1925	27 May 1925	Sofia	Communist terrorists participating in the St Nedelya Church assault	Hanging	
Georgi Koev	Male	1925	27 May 1925	Sofia	Communist terrorists participating in the St Nedelya Church assault	Hanging	
Georgi Mandulov	Male	1925	27 June 1925	Anton	Conspiring to aid communist activity	Firing squad	
Nesho Shabanov	Male	1925	27 June 1925	Anton	Conspiring to aid communist activity	Firing squad	
The Gostevi brothers	Male	1925	27 June 1925	Anton	Conspiring to aid communist activity	Firing squad	
Sokrat Kirshveng	Male	1937	14 April 1937	Sofia	"The Killer with the Adze"; serial killer who killed his aunt and her husband during a robbery in Sofia, but had previously been convicted of killing two wives and attempting to kill a third in 1919. The first sentence was commuted to 17 years imprisonment, and he was released in 1937.	Hanging	
August Popov	Male	1942	26 June 1942	Sofia	Instigating communist rebellion; tried as part of the "Parachutist trial"	Firing squad	
Trifon Georgiev	Male	1942	26 June 1942	Sofia	Instigating communist rebellion; tried as part of the "Parachutist trial"	Firing squad	
Vasil Yotov	Male	1942	26 June 1942	Sofia	Instigating communist rebellion; tried as part of the "Parachutist trial"	Firing squad	
Ivan Izatovski	Male	1942	26 June 1942	Sofia	Instigating communist rebellion; tried as part of the "Parachutist trial"	Firing squad	
Yozef Baido	Male	1942	26 June 1942	Sofia	Instigating communist rebellion; tried as part of the "Parachutist trial"	Firing squad	
Andon Bekyarov	Male	1942	26 June 1942	Sofia	Instigating communist rebellion; tried as part of the "Parachutist trial"	Firing squad	
Dimitar Dimitrov	Male	1942	26 June 1942	Sofia	Instigating communist rebellion; tried as part of the "Parachutist trial"	Firing squad	
Vasil Dodov	Male	1942	26 June 1942	Sofia	Instigating communist rebellion; tried as part of the "Parachutist trial"	Firing squad	
Stefan Pashev	Male	1942	26 June 1942	Sofia	Instigating communist rebellion; tried as part of the "Parachutist trial"	Firing squad	
Boris Tomchev	Male	1942	26 June 1942	Sofia	Instigating communist rebellion; tried as part of the "Parachutist trial"	Firing squad	
Delcho Naplatanov	Male	1942	26 June 1942	Sofia	Instigating communist rebellion; tried as part of the "Parachutist trial"	Firing squad	
Ivan Drenovski	Male	1942	26 June 1942	Sofia	Instigating communist rebellion; tried as part of the "Parachutist trial"	Firing squad	
Georgi Kratunchev	Male	1942	26 June 1942	Sofia	Instigating communist rebellion; tried as part of the "Parachutist trial"	Firing squad	
Dimitar Teplyakov	Male	1942	26 June 1942	Sofia	Instigating communist rebellion; tried as part of the "Parachutist trial"	Firing squad	
Ivan Ivanov	Male	1942	26 June 1942	Sofia	Instigating communist rebellion; tried as part of the "Parachutist trial"	Firing squad	
Georgi Bashikarov	Male	1942	26 June 1942	Sofia	Instigating communist rebellion; tried as part of the "Parachutist trial"	Firing squad	
Yanko Komitov	Male	1942	26 June 1942	Sofia	Instigating communist rebellion; tried as part of the "Parachutist trial"	Firing squad	
Todor Nikolov	Male	1942	26 June 1942	Sofia	Instigating communist rebellion; tried as part of the "Parachutist trial"	Firing squad	
Nikolai Romanov	Male	1942	26 June 1942	Sofia	Instigating communist rebellion; tried as part of the "Parachutist trial"	Firing squad	
Mirko Petkov	Male	1942	26 June 1942	Sofia	Instigating communist rebellion; tried as part of the "Parachutist trial"	Firing squad	
Simeon Slavov	Male	1942	26 June 1942	Sofia	Instigating communist rebellion; tried as part of the "Parachutist trial"	Firing squad	
Ivan Shterev	Male	1942	26 June 1942	Sofia	Instigating communist rebellion; tried as part of the "Parachutist trial"	Firing squad	
Milyo Milev	Male	1942	26 June 1942	Sofia	Instigating communist rebellion; tried as part of the "Parachutist trial"	Firing squad	
Dimo Astadzhov	Male	1942	26 June 1942	Sofia	Instigating communist rebellion; tried as part of the "Parachutist trial"	Firing squad	
Vladimir Chernov	Male	1942	26 June 1942	Sofia	Instigating communist rebellion; tried as part of the "Parachutist trial"	Firing squad	
Cvyatko Radoinov	Male	1942	26 June 1942	Sofia	Instigating communist rebellion; tried as part of the "Parachutist trial"	Firing squad	
Anton Ivanov	Male	1942	23 July 1942	Sofia	Communist revolutionaries in opposition to the Filov government	Firing squad	
Anton Popov	Male	1942	23 July 1942	Sofia	Communist revolutionaries in opposition to the Filov government	Firing squad	
Nikola Vaptsarov	Male	1942	23 July 1942	Sofia	Communist revolutionaries in opposition to the Filov government	Firing squad	
Atanas Romanov	Male	1942	23 July 1942	Sofia	Communist revolutionaries in opposition to the Filov government	Firing squad	
Petar Bogdanov	Male	1942	23 July 1942	Sofia	Communist revolutionaries in opposition to the Filov government	Firing squad	
Georgi Minchev	Male	1942	23 July 1942	Sofia	Communist revolutionaries in opposition to the Filov government	Firing squad	
Vasil Antevski	Male	1942	18 August 1942	Sofia	Participation in the League of Communists of Yugoslavia	Hanging	
Adalbert Antonov	Male	1942	4 December 1942	Sofia	Participation in the Workers Youth League	Firing squad	
Yovan Basarov	Male	1942	21 March 1943	Skopje	Participation in the League of Communists of Yugoslavia	Hanging	
Boyan Chonos	Male	1943	13 October 1943	Vidin	Aiding communist rebellion	Hanging	
Ferdinand Aleksandrov	Male	1943	17 December 1943	Pleven	Aiding communist rebellion	Firing squad	
Yakim Atanasov	Male	1944	1 March 1944	Lom	Leading a communist partisan squadron	Hanging	
Ferdinand Milanov	Male	1944	1 June 1944	Plovdiv	Aiding communist rebellion	Firing squad	
Yozo Tobiev	Male	1944	1 June 1944	Plovdiv	Aiding communist rebellion	Firing squad	
Yordanka Chankova	Female	1944	1 June 1944	Eleshnitsa	Participating on the communist side during the "Battle of Batulia"	Firing squad	
Frank Thompson	Male	1944	10 June 1944	Litakovo	Participating on the communist side during the "Battle of Batulia"	Firing squad	
Lazar Atanasov	Male	1944	10 June 1944	Litakovo	Participating on the communist side during the "Battle of Batulia"	Firing squad	
Hristo Gurbov	Male	1944	10 June 1944	Litakovo	Participating on the communist side during the "Battle of Batulia"	Firing squad	
Ivan Harlakov	Male	1945	1945	Sofia	Member of the Tsarist government	Firing squad	
Kiril, Prince of Preslav	Male	1945	1 February 1945	Sofia	Member of the royal family and regent of Bulgaria	Firing squad	
Nikola Mihov	Male	1945	1 February 1945	Sofia	Lieutenant general and regent of Bulgaria	Firing squad	
Dobri Bozhilov	Male	1945	1 February 1945	Sofia	Former Prime Minister of Bulgaria, supposed charges of war and financial crimes	Firing squad	
Petar Gabrovski	Male	1945	1 February 1945	Sofia	Former Prime Minister of Bulgaria and lawyer	Firing squad	
Ivan Bagrianov	Male	1945	1 February 1945	Sofia	Member of the Tsarist government	Firing squad	
Rashko Atanasov	Male	1945	1 February 1945	Sofia	Member of the Tsarist government	Firing squad	
Ivan Beshkov	Male	1945	1 February 1945	Sofia	Member of the Tsarist government	Firing squad	
Ivan Vazov	Male	1945	1 February 1945	Sofia	Member of the Tsarist government	Firing squad	
Dimitar Shishmanov	Male	1945	1 February 1945	Sofia	Member of the Tsarist government	Firing squad	
Sirko Stanchev	Male	1945	1 February 1945	Sofia	Member of the Tsarist government	Firing squad	
Aleksandar Stanishev	Male	1945	1 February 1945	Sofia	Member of the Tsarist government	Firing squad	
Spas Ganev	Male	1945	1 February 1945	Sofia	Member of the Tsarist government	Firing squad	
Delcho Todorov	Male	1945	1 February 1945	Sofia	Member of the Tsarist government	Firing squad	
Nikola Stoychev	Male	1945	1 February 1945	Sofia	Member of the Tsarist government	Firing squad	
Bogdan Filov	Male	1945	2 February 1945	Sofia	Prime Minister of Bulgaria and regent of the Tsarist government	Firing squad	
Aleksandar Staliyski	Male	1945	2 February 1945	Sofia	Collaboration with pro-Axis cabinet	Firing squad	
Yordan Sevov	Male	1945	2 February 1945	Sofia	Member of the Tsarist government	Firing squad	
Lyuben Stanchev	Male	1945	6 March 1945	unknown	Member of the Tsarist government	Firing squad	
Konstantin Lukash	Male	1945	15 March 1945	Sofia	Officer and Chief of Staff of the Bulgarian Army	Firing squad	
Trifon Trifonov	Male	1945	15 March 1945	Sofia	Member of the Tsarist government	Firing squad	
Nicho Georgiev	Male	1945	21 April 1945	Sofia	Member of the Tsarist government	Firing squad	
Vasil Zlatevski	Male	1945	September 1945	Kyustendil	Goryanin, waging rebellion against the communist government	Hanging	
Docho Hristov	Male	1945	26 October 1945	unknown	Attempted rebellion against the communist government	Firing squad	

=== People's Republic of Bulgaria ===
Executed person	Gender	Date of sentence	Date of execution	Place of execution	Crime	Method	Ref.
Faik Aliev	Male	1948	1948	Nevrokop	Goryanin, waging rebellion against the communist government	Hanging	
Pavel Djidjov	Male	1952	3 October 1952	Sofia	Catholics, subverting communist ideology	Firing squad	
Eugene Bossilkov	Male	1952	11 November 1952	Sofia	Catholics, subverting communist ideology	Firing squad	
Josaphat Chichkov	Male	1952	11 November 1952	Sofia	Catholics, subverting communist ideology	Firing squad	
Kamen Vitchev	Male	1952	11 November 1952	Sofia	Catholics, subverting communist ideology	Firing squad	
Ivan-Asen Georgiev	Male	1963	4 January 1964	Sofia	Espionage on behalf of the United States	Shooting	
Radan Sarafov	Male	18 February 1968	18 February 1969	Sofia	Espionage on behalf of the United States, France and Albania	Shooting	
Georgi Yordanov	Male	1975	1975	Sofia	Known as "Joro the Paver, the Second". Serial rapist who raped ten women in Sofia in the early 1970s, committing a double murder in the process.	Shooting	
Zhivko Dimitrov	Male	1981	1981	Tolbuhin	Serial killer. Murdered six people in Dobrich Province from 1975 to 1981 for money.	Shooting	
Margarit Dimitrov	Male	17 April 1986	28 January 1987	Sofia	Espionage on behalf of the Western countries	Shooting	
Georgi Alinski	Male	1984	4 November 1989	Sofia	Attempted to sabotage a lift in Borovets to prevent the country from participating in a ski championship	Shooting	

== See also ==
- Krum's laws
