= Water in Arkansas =

Water supply and distribution in the U.S. state of Arkansas

Water in Arkansas is an important issue encompassing the conservation, protection, management, distribution and use of the water resource in the state. Arkansas contains a mixture of groundwater and surface water, with a variety of state and federal agencies responsible for the regulation of the water resource. In accordance with agency rules, state, and federal law, the state's water treatment facilities utilize engineering, chemistry, science and technology to treat raw water from the environment to potable water standards and distribute it through water mains to homes, farms, business and industrial customers. Following use, wastewater is collected in collection and conveyance systems (sanitary sewers and combined sewers), decentralized sewer systems or septic tanks and treated in accordance with regulations at publicly owned treatment works (POTWs) before being discharged to the environment.

Although Arkansas is not classified as an arid state, certain regions of the state have experienced supply depletion, especially in areas of heavy reliance upon aquifers for agricultural water. Currently, the state does not have direct or indirect potable reuse (DPR, IPR), or even water reuse regulations, although one instance of non potable reuse is currently permitted in Rogers.

== Regulation ==
=== Groundwater Protection and Management Programs ===
There are three main components of groundwater protection and management:

- ensuring the available quantity necessary for the various uses
- protecting and restoring groundwater quality
- ambient monitoring of groundwater quality on a continuous basis.

State water-resources protection authority is generally divided among various State agencies. The Arkansas Department of Environmental Quality (ADEQ) has primary water-quality protection authority, and the Arkansas Department of Health (ADH) has authority over public drinking-water-supply programs. The Arkansas Natural Resources Commission (ANRC) has comprehensive planning and water-quantity authority and is responsible for protection of diminishing groundwater supplies in areas where agricultural, public, and industrial needs have placed unsustainable demands on production capacities of certain aquifers. The broad scope of groundwater protection and management activities requires a multiagency approach to address groundwater quantity and quality issues.

==== Groundwater Quality Protection and Restoration ====
There are numerous potential and actual sources of groundwater contamination in the State, both natural and manmade. Arkansas Department of Environmental Quality (2012) identified the ten major sources of contamination in Arkansas to be animal feedlots, fertilizers, pesticides, underground storage tanks, surface impoundments, landfills, septic systems, hazardous wastes sites, saltwater intrusion, and spills. It is difficult to define which sources have the greatest effect on groundwater quality because each source varies in areal extent and degree of alteration of groundwater quality. For example, a point source, such as a landfill, may result in severe impact to groundwater with numerous organic chemicals exceeding safe drinking-water standards, but the areal extent of the plume may be limited with no offsite migration and no known groundwater users at risk. On the other hand, contamination from nonpoint sources, such as agricultural activities, may be areally extensive with minimal effect on the use of the groundwater for drinking-water supply or other purposes. Point-source prevention programs are almost entirely established as regulatory programs and are administered primarily by ADEQ. Most nonpoint sources are related to agriculture and other land-use activities and commonly are addressed by joint efforts of several agencies, with lead oversight relegated to the ANRC.

Despite the threat to groundwater resources, no Federal or State statute comprehensively addresses groundwater protection. There are currently only patchworks of law at the Federal and State levels that address groundwater protection. The United States Environmental Protection Agency (USEPA, or just EPA) has been designated by Congress to be the primary Federal agency responsible for groundwater protection; however, there is no comprehensive Federal groundwater law comparable to the legislation addressing surface-water pollution. Instead, the EPA enforces requirements of a myriad of Federal laws having provisions that protect groundwater quality. These laws include among others: the Safe Drinking Water Act (SDWA) of 1974 (42 USC §300f et seq.[and the following]) and amendments; the Resource Conservation and Recovery Act (RCRA) of 1976 (42 USC §6901 et seq.); and the Comprehensive Environmental Response, Compensation, and Liability Act (CERCLA) of 1980 (42 USC §9601 et seq.) and amendments. The Clean Water Act (CWA) of 1972 (33 USC §1251 et seq.), including the 1977 amendments, is the primary Federal law in the United States that governs the discharge of pollutants into the Nation's waters. The CWA's primary regulatory mechanism is the National Pollutant Discharge Elimination System (NPDES), which requires permits to be issued for discharges of any pollutant or combination of pollutants into navigable waters. Certain sections specifically address groundwater, but it is unclear whether the CWA's pollution-control provisions apply to groundwater. Some provisions of the CWA clearly apply to groundwater. For example, Section 106 provides for regional monitoring of surface water and groundwater; and Section 304 provides for development of specific water-quality criteria, which would include groundwater quality (Quatrochi, 1996).

Act 472 of 1949, the Arkansas Water and Air Pollution Control Act, codified as Arkansas Code Annotated (ACA §8–4–101 et seq.), defines groundwater as a part of "waters of the state" that are subject to protection. This act is the primary statute providing authority to State agencies for the regulation of various programs that protect human health and the environment; however, Act 472 of 1949 does not contain reporting requirements for groundwater contamination nor does it contain numerical standards or other guidance for monitoring or remediating groundwater contamination. ADEQ is the State's delegated authority responsible for implementing various EPA programs and enforces environmental policies set by the Arkansas Pollution Control and Ecology Commission (APCEC); however, other State agencies also have authority to enact rules and regulations that address groundwater protection. Restoring aquifers to beneficial use and minimizing human exposure to contaminants can be very costly when protection mechanisms have failed or were not in place. Most remedial activities are the responsibility of ADEQ.

==== Groundwater Contamination Prevention Programs ====
There are a number of potential threats to groundwater drinking-water supplies from point and nonpoint sources of contamination. This section describes various State programs initiated with the intended purpose of preventing potential contamination of drinking water and its sources.

===== Wellhead Protection =====
Originally, the Federal SDWA focused primarily on treatment as the means of providing safe drinking water at the tap. The law was amended in 1986 and 1996 and required many actions to protect drinking water and its sources. The amendments of 1986 specified that certain program activities, such as delineation, contaminant-source inventory, and source-management plans, be incorporated into state Wellhead Protection Programs (WHPP). Implementation of Arkansas's WHPP began in the early 1990s. The WHPP is a voluntary program that is maintained by the public water systems and local communities with technical assistance and guidance provided by the ADH. The goal of the program is to develop strategies and methods for managing a wellhead protection area for groundwater sources of public supply.

The 1996 amendments greatly enhanced the existing law by recognizing source-water protection of all public drinking-water supplies (surface and groundwater). States were asked to develop and implement Source Water Assessment Programs (SWAPs) to evaluate the vulnerability of public drinking-water systems to possible sources of contamination throughout the State and use this information as a management tool for the benefit and protection of public water systems. In Arkansas, the WHPP is now part of the SWAP. Arkansas' SWAP includes delineating the source-water assessment areas, conducting contaminant source inventories, determining the susceptibility of each public water supply source to contamination from the inventoried sources, and releasing the results of the assessments to the public (Arkansas Department of Health, 2009). Those systems that are considered vulnerable are advised to take action through community education programs or by passing city ordinances to protect water sources.

===== Water Well Construction =====
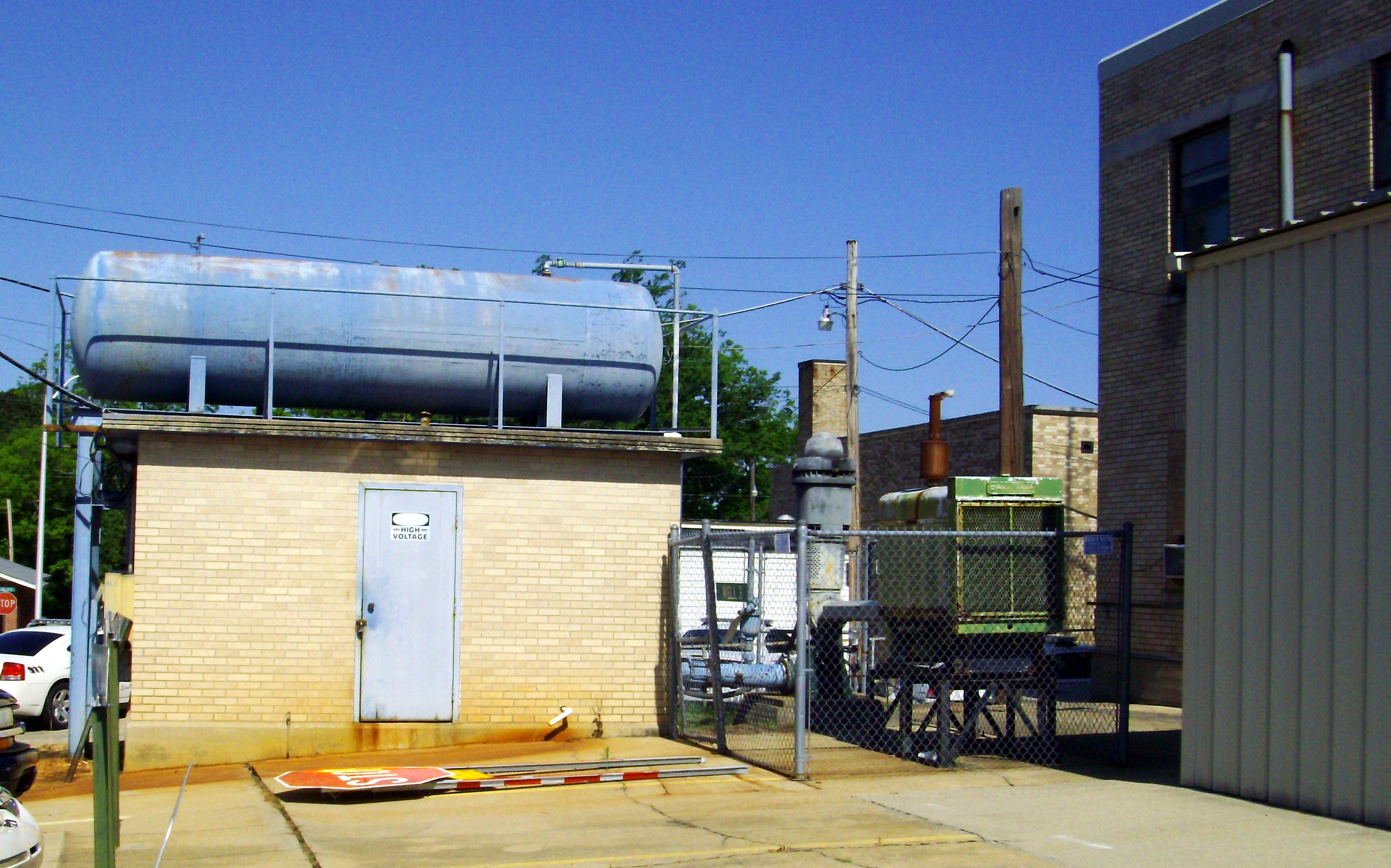
Well #3 and water treatment works, Monticello

The Arkansas Water Well Construction Commission (AWWCC) regulates the development of groundwater supplies to provide safe water for public consumption, and Act 855 of 2003 (ACA §17–50–401 et seq.) provides a means of holding persons who violate Arkansas law regarding water-well construction accountable for their actions. AWWCC licenses water-well contractors and registers drillers, pump installers, and their apprentices. The rules and regulations of the Arkansas Water Well Construction Commission (2011) provide minimum standards for the construction and abandonment of water wells (that is, water supply, geothermal, and monitoring) so that groundwater is protected from contamination. Water-well contractors must file a well-completion report for each well. Well-completion data are maintained in an ANRC database that is linked to the USGS water-use database (https://water.usgs.gov/watuse/).

Water-well records also may be obtained from Arkansas Geological Survey (AGS), which has over 145,000 water-well construction records on file by county and township/range that date from the early 1970s. Administrative and investigative functions are carried out by ANRC. ANRC responds to complaints from the public about water-well construction, as well as inspecting wells for violations of the rules and regulations. ANRC also works closely with ADH and its Environmental Health Specialist in each county and conducts well inspections in each county. These inspections are to ensure the protection of groundwater through compliance with the rules and regulations established by the ANRC.

===== Pesticide Management =====
The Arkansas State Plant Board (ASPB) is the lead agency for implementing the Federal Insecticide, Fungicide, and Rodenticide Act (FIFRA) of 1996 (7 USC §136 et seq .). The ASPB has been monitoring groundwater since 2004 using an EPA-approved Pesticide Management Plan that allows the agency to work with ADH to determine actions to be taken in the event pesticide contamination is confirmed (Arkansas State Plant Board, 2013). ASPB also developed the Arkansas Agricultural Abandoned Pesticide Program as a way for farmers to safely and properly dispose of unused pesticides. This program is conducted in cooperation with ASPB, the University of Arkansas Cooperative Extension Service, the Arkansas Farm Bureau, ANRC, and ADEQ. Representatives from these agencies comprise the Abandoned Pesticide Advisory Board. The Abandoned Pesticide Advisory Board selects counties for collection events and has a goal of holding at least one collection event in every county in Arkansas. The Advisory Board uses priority watersheds as a guiding principle when selecting counties for pesticide collections. The pesticide collections began in 2005 in northeastern Arkansas; by the spring of 2009, at least one collection had been held in each county in eastern Arkansas. By the spring of 2011, the Abandoned Pesticide Program had collected over 744,000 pounds of unwanted pesticides from Arkansas farmers in 55 different counties (Arkansas State Plant Board, 2013). The pesticide collections are paid for by the pesticide manufacturers through a fee added to the registration of each agricultural pesticide used in Arkansas. There is no cost to the farmer, and participation in the program is anonymous.

===== State Nonpoint Source Program =====
Potential sources of nonpoint source (NPS) pollution in groundwater include excess fertilizers, chemicals, and animal wastes from row-crop agriculture, residential and urban areas, pastures, and concentrated animal feeding operations. ANRC is responsible for developing and implementing the State's NPS program (Arkansas Natural Resources Commission, 1999). This program is a cooperative effort of many local, State, and Federal agencies; regional and local entities; nonprofit organizations; and watershed groups. The program promotes voluntary action to improve water quality. Projects may include implementation of best management programs (BMPs), demonstrations of effective techniques, technical assistance, education, and monitoring. ANRC's NPS program is supported by grant funds under Section 319 of the CWA.

===== Oversight of Public Water-Supply Systems =====
The SDWA was passed by Congress in 1974 to protect public health by regulating the Nation's drinking-water supply. The SDWA authorizes the EPA to set national health-based standards that protect against naturally occurring and manmade contaminants in drinking water. The EPA, States, and public water systems work together to ensure that these standards are met.

The ADH has primary enforcement responsibility and provides oversight of public water systems throughout the State. ADH reviews new water-system facility construction, inspects water-system facilities, troubleshoots water-treatment and distribution problems, investigates complaints, and collects and analyzes samples to determine water quality. ADH enacts rules to ensure that public water systems adhere to EPA regulations (Arkansas State Board of Health, 2012b) enacted under the authority of Act 96 of 1913 as amended (ACA §20–7–109). These rules and regulations incorporate the Federal National Primary Drinking Water Regulations found in Title 40 of the Code of Federal Regulations (40 CFR) parts 141, 142, and 143 (U.S. Environmental Protection Agency, 2001).

Monitoring the quality of drinking water is a joint responsibility of ADH and the State's public water-supply systems. According to ADH (Bradley Jones, Arkansas Department of Health, oral commun., 2013), Arkansas has over 1,190 individual groundwater wells used for public drinking-water supply. Statewide, there are about 710 community public drinking-water systems, of which about 690 use groundwater as their only water source. These groundwater systems serve more than 870,000 residents. Additionally, there are about 35 facilities defined by the SDWA as noncommunity, nontransient public water systems that rely on groundwater. These smaller facilities include schools, daycare centers, and businesses. There are also about 375 transient noncommunity public systems such as restaurants, churches, community centers, and campgrounds that use groundwater.

===== National Environmental Policy Act =====
The National Environmental Policy Act (NEPA) of 1969 (42 USC §4321 et seq.) and amendments require that all actions sponsored, funded, permitted, or approved by Federal agencies undergo planning to ensure that environmental considerations (including impacts to groundwater) are given due weight in project decision making. NEPA has procedural requirements for all Federal government agencies to prepare environmental assessments (EAS) and environmental impact statements (EISs).

===== Permit Programs =====
Protecting groundwater is accomplished through issuance of permits, inspections, as well as continuous monitoring and enforcement of the regulations. ADEQ and other State agencies issue many types of permits for activities that can have a negative effect on groundwater quality. Permits can establish limits for specific chemicals or groups of pollutants or can require BMPs designed to reduce release of pollutants to surface and groundwater resources.

====== Underground Injection Control ======
Part C of the SDWA of 1977 required the EPA to establish regulations for the disposal of wastewaters in underground reservoirs. The Underground Injection Control (UIC) program is responsible for regulating the construction, operation, permitting, and closure of injection wells constructed for underground storage or disposal of wastewater. Arkansas was given primary enforcement authority to administer the UIC program in 1982. There are three classes of underground injection wells in Arkansas—Class I, Class II, and Class V (U.S. Environmental Protection Agency, 1984). ADEQ has the authority to regulate Class I and V wells (excluding bromine-related, spent-brine disposal wells).

The Arkansas Oil and Gas Commission (AOGC) has State primacy to regulate Class II wells and shares enforcement authority with ADEQ of the Class V bromine-disposal wells as recognized in a Memorandum of Understanding between ADEQ, AOGC, and EPA. Corresponding Federal regulations found in 40 CFR parts 144, 145, and 146 provide performance standards for location, design, installation, construction, and maintenance of permitted facilities. ADEQ issues UIC permits pursuant to APCEC Regulation 17 (Arkansas Pollution Control and Ecology Commission, 2005). AOGC issues Class II well permits under General Rule H, General Rules and Regulations (Arkansas Oil and Gas Commission, 2013).

Class I wells inject hazardous and nonhazardous wastes into saline formations found at depths between 2,500 and 8,700 ft below ground surface. Class I requirements stipulate that a facility be able to demonstrate that injected waste will not impact groundwater (or surface water) for 10,000 years. There are 14 operating Class I wells in Arkansas: 4 hazardous and 10 nonhazardous wells (Linda Hanson, Arkansas Department of Environmental Quality, oral commun., 2013). Four of the wells are "shut-in," meaning the wells are not currently injecting fluids.

Class II wells are the primary means of disposal for energy and production wastes and include enhanced oil recovery injection wells and saltwater disposal wells. Most of the injected fluid is saltwater (brine), which is brought to the surface in the process of producing oil and gas. In addition, brine and other fluids, like diesel fuel, are injected to enhance oil and gas production. There are approximately 28 Class II commercial disposal wells and over 500 noncommercial, producer-owned Class II disposal wells in Arkansas (State 8 Review of Oil and Natural Gas Environmental Regulations, 2012).

Class V wells are shallow, subsurface treatment and disposal systems such as air conditioning return-flow wells, cooling water return-flow wells, drainage wells for stormwater runoff, dry wells, recharge wells, saltwater intrusion barrier wells, septic systems for multiple dwellings, subsidence-control wells, geothermal wells, solution-mining wells, spent-brine, return-flow wells, in-situ recovery, motor-vehicle waste disposal, and wells used in experimental technology. Large-capacity cesspools are also Class V wells, but they are banned in Arkansas under authority of the ADH. There are approximately 136 Class V wells that are permitted by ADEQ and 74 bromine wells permitted by AOGC (Linda Hanson, Arkansas Department of Environmental Quality, oral commun., 2013; Rex Robertson, Arkansas Oil and Gas Commission, oral commun., 2013).

====== Hazardous Waste ======
The ADEQ's Hazardous Waste Division (HWD) implements Arkansas' RCRA Subtitle C waste-management program governing the management and disposition of hazardous wastes, used oils, and universal wastes and administers the State's hazardous waste program under authority of the Arkansas Hazardous Waste Management Act 406 of 1979, as amended (ACA §8–7–02 et seq.)

The HWD received delegation of the Federal RCRA hazardous waste-management program from the EPA. State and Federal hazardous waste-management regulations and requirements are merged into a single reference document, APCEC Regulation 23 (Arkansas Pollution Control and Ecology Commission, 2012a). The HWD relies on record keeping to maintain a "cradle- to-grave" tracking system for all generated hazardous wastes. Proper management and pollution-prevention techniques are designed to ensure against contamination of groundwater. If there is improper management of hazardous wastes, the program requires that actions be taken to remedy the situation and to restore, to the extent possible, quality of the affected groundwater. A strong oversight and enforcement effort are maintained to provide high visibility as a deterrent against future violations. Certain permitted facilities that are used to manage hazardous wastes have specific construction criteria designed to protect groundwater quality. Permit conditions for these facilities include the requirement for groundwater monitoring that meets the requirements of APCEC Regulation 23.

====== Solid Waste ======
Nonhazardous landfills are subject to Federal regulation under Subtitle D of RCRA, 40 CFR, parts 258 and 257. ADEQ's Solid Waste Management Division (SWMD) regulates the management and disposal of nonhazardous wastes through adoption of Subtitle D and by implementing rules and regulations in APCEC Regulation 22 (Arkansas Pollution Control and Ecology Commission, 2008), which came into effect in 1993 and was adopted pursuant to the Arkansas Solid Waste Management Act.

Permits are required for various classes of landfills. Class 1 landfills include all municipal solid waste landfill units. These landfills can accept household wastes, commercial wastes, and approved industrial wastes. Class 3 landfills accept commercial, industrial, and special solid wastes, and Class 4 landfills accept construction and demolition debris and other nonputrescible wastes. The solid waste program permitting requirements for facilities accepting wastes are directed at protecting groundwater and surface water, while assuring the safe management and disposal of wastes. Permitting requirements for Class I landfills and most Class 3 landfills include liners and leachate-collection/treatment systems, groundwater-monitoring systems, and other environmental protection systems that protect groundwater. At a minimum, semiannual reports are submitted by facilities required to monitor groundwater. If constituents in groundwater around the landfill exceed the EPA MCLs for drinking-water supplies, corrective action is required to bring the facility into compliance. A Post-Closure Trust Fund pays for corrective action needed after closure of landfills. The SWMD currently (2013) evaluates environmental monitoring data for one closed landfill.

====== Waste Utilization ======
Pursuant to Act 472 of 1949, as amended, ADEQ has the power to issue permits "to prevent, control or abate pollution." Therefore, any waste-disposal system that does not discharge directly into the waters of the State must be operated under the terms and conditions of a no-discharge water permit. An example of a no-discharge permit is a UIC well permit. Other no-discharge permits are required for land application, land farming, and subsurface disposal of water-treatment-plant residuals, and industrial and animal wastes.

Permit procedures for liquid animal waste-management systems are described in APCEC Regulation 5 enacted in May 2012 (Arkansas Pollution Control and Ecology Commission, 2012b). An objective of the regulation is to control nutrients from confined animal operations with such systems. Obtaining a permit requires, among other conditions, an approved waste-management plan that is prepared by Natural Resource Conservation Service (NRCS), the University of Arkansas Cooperative Extension Service, a Certified Nutrient Management Planner, a water-quality technician from ANRC, or a professional engineer. By limiting the amount of nutrients applied to those actually required by crops, excess amounts of nutrients can be controlled and surface water and groundwater protected.

====== Onsite Sewage Disposal Systems ======
The ADH administers the Arkansas State Board of Health Rules and Regulations pertaining to onsite wastewater systems (Arkansas State Board of Health, 2012a). These Groundwater Protection and Management Programs regulations were enacted under the authority of Act 402 of 1977 and established minimum standards for the design and construction of individual sewage disposal systems, including alternate and experimental sewage system applications and subdivision systems. Onsite wastewater-system permits are required for operation, and the systems must be installed by licensed contractors. These systems typically are designed by ADH Designated Representatives and approved by local health units. There are approximately 400,000 onsite wastewater systems in Arkansas (Renae Mites, Arkansas Department of Health, oral commun., 2013).

====== Mining ======
The Surface Mining and Reclamation Division (SMRD) of ADEQ regulates surface mining and reclamation, which includes the coal program and the noncoal program. The Surface Mining Control and Reclamation Act of 1977 (SMCRA) established performance standards for coal mining operations for the express purpose of protecting society and the environment from the adverse effects of surface coal mining operations and to ensure reclamation of mine sites. States were charged with submitting a State program covering surface coal mining and reclamation operations. As such, the Arkansas Surface Coal Mining and Reclamation Act, Act 134 of 1979, authorized the State to develop, adopt, issue, and amend rules and regulations pertaining to surface coal mining and reclamation operations. Active coal mines must comply with APCEC Regulation 20 (Arkansas Pollution Control and Ecology Commission, 2002). Regulation 20 has a groundwater protection clause requiring mine operators to control or prevent the discharge of acid mine drainage into groundwater systems.

Act 827 of 1991, as amended, deals with the reclamation of land affected by the mining of noncoal minerals, such as bauxite, clay, and sand and gravel, using open-cut mining methods. A 1999 amendment authorized the regulation of soil and shale pits with some exemptions based on the size of the pit and the distance from adjacent property lines. APCEC Regulation 15, the Arkansas Open Cut Mining and Land Reclamation (Arkansas Pollution Control and Ecology Commission, 2012c), set performance standards that must be followed during mining and the process of reclaiming land to a beneficial use. Act 1166 of 1997 provided a regulatory framework for the operation, reclamation, and safe closure of new stone quarries and any land purchased or leased for a quarry.

====== Oil and Gas Production ======
Arkansas has a long history of oil and gas production beginning in the early 1900s. In 2012, there were about 7,000 oil-production wells in southern Arkansas and about 4,000 gas-production wells in northern Arkansas; however, since 2004, the majority of gas production has occurred in north-central Arkansas, where gas-production is being developed at a rate of about 700–900 wells per year (State Review of Oil and Natural Gas Environmental Regulations, 2012) through the use of horizontal drilling and hydraulic fracturing.

Oil and gas exploration and production, as well as hydraulic fracturing, is regulated by the AOGC. This authority was given to AOGC in Subtitle 6, Title 15 of the Arkansas Code. Regulations describing requirements for oil and gas well development activities, including hydraulic fracturing and use of Class II UIC wells, have been adopted under the authority of these statutes. Storage of saltwater prior to injection in Class II UIC wells is regulated by ADEQ under APCEC Regulation 1 (Arkansas Pollution Control and Ecology Commission, 1993).

Concerns by local citizens and citizen groups on the potential environmental effects of gas production resulted in more stringent State regulations. For example, AOGC General Rule B–19 was among the first rules in the Nation to require public disclosure of the chemicals used in hydraulic fracturing operations; AOGC General Rule B–26 governs the siting, construction, and operation of pits and tanks used for the holding or storage of well fluids; AOGC General Rules B–17, B–26, and B–34 address spill prevention and cleanup; and AOGC General Rule–19 has production casing requirements specific to the Fayetteville Shale that are the first line of defense in protecting groundwater during hydraulic fracturing operations (Arkansas Oil and Gas Commission, 2013).

Responsibilities for water use and disposal related to hydraulic fracturing for gas production are through various State programs. The use of surface water for makeup water is governed by regulations administered by ANRC. The AOGC and ADEQ respond to complaints of water-well contamination, and AOGC has adopted joint standards with ADEQ. The inclusion of multiuse reserve pits in the rules (General Rule B–17 [Arkansas Oil and Gas Commission, 2013] and APCEC Regulation 34 [Arkansas Pollution Control and Ecology Commission, 2011a]) encourages reuse and recycling of return flow waters from gas-production operations for hydraulic fracturing purposes. The ADH regulates sources of ionizing radiation including naturally occurring radioactive materials (NORM). A produced water or effluent concentration of greater than or equal to 60 picocuries per liter (pCi/L) for combined radium-226 and radium-228 would be subject to ADH regulations. Owners/operators would be required to notify the ADH as part of the ADH's NORM General Licensee registration process. Regulatory efforts are coordinated with the ADEQ and the AOGC (Bevill Bernard, Arkansas Department of Health, written commun., 2014).

====== Stormwater ======
Urban stormwater discharges are generated by runoff from paved surfaces including streets, parking lots, and other impervious areas (for example, buildings) during rainfall and snow events, which often contain pollutants in quantities that could adversely affect water quality. Most urban and industrial stormwater discharges are considered point sources and therefore require coverage by a NPDES permit under APCEC Regulation 2 (Arkansas Pollution Control and Ecology Commission, 2011b). The primary method to control stormwater discharges is through use of BMPs. There are a variety of traditional and low-impact BMPs, including retention and detention ponds, biofilters, grassed filter strips, porous pavement, wetlands, and others. BMPs are especially important in northern Arkansas because stormwater can discharge directly through karst features into aquifers.

==== Groundwater Remediation and Restoration ====
Remediation of groundwater contaminated by anthropogenic sources often is required to restore groundwater to its previous uses. Numerous sites in Arkansas have been investigated or remediated under voluntary actions, through enforcement, or under hazardous waste permits. Most cleanups are overseen by ADEQ, but if radiological materials are involved, ADH will lead the cleanup effort. This section describes some of the programs through which groundwater remediation is managed in Arkansas.

===== Groundwater Remediation Level Interim Policy =====
The goal of groundwater remediation in Arkansas is to protect, enhance, and restore, to the extent technically and economically feasible, groundwater conditions to the maximum beneficial use, while maintaining conditions that are protective of human health and the environment (Ellen Carpenter, Arkansas Department of Environmental Quality, oral commun., 2005). It is the policy of ADEQ that until final regulations are enacted by APCEC specific to the establishment of groundwater cleanup standards, cleanup levels or goals will be established on a case-by-case basis in a consistent manner. The process includes full characterization of the contaminant plume, source-control measures, BMPs to control migration of the plume, and a groundwater cleanup strategy. Preliminary remediation goals are established after an evaluation of risks to human health and the environment; consideration is given to the current and reasonably anticipated future land use, including groundwater usage. Because many citizens drink groundwater and use it in their homes, ADEQ currently classifies all groundwater in Arkansas as a potential source of drinking water. It is not necessary for groundwater to be defined as an aquifer (that is, a saturated permeable geologic formation that can produce a significant quantity of water) in order to be protected. Thus, final groundwater remediation levels are the existing Federal MCLs. Institutional controls, such as deed restrictions or city ordinances, are used with source controls to minimize the potential for human exposure to contamination by limiting groundwater use.

===== Federal and State Programs for Hazardous Waste Sites =====
The Federal Superfund program, authorized by CERCLA, was established to identify, prioritize, and clean up hazardous wastes sites posing threats to human health and the environment. Sites identified under the Superfund program are placed on the National Priority List (NPL). In 2013, there were 14 NPL sites in Arkansas (U.S. Environmental Protection Agency, 2013). ADEQ HWD ensures that State requirements are met during investigation and cleanup of sites designated under this Federal Superfund program. ADEQ's HWD administers a similar cleanup program for abandoned hazardous wastes sites under authority of the Remedial Action Trust Fund Act (RATFA) of 1985. The Arkansas RATFA State Priority List identifies those hazardous substance sites for which expenditures to investigate and remediate are authorized.

===== Brownfields Program =====
Arkansas Voluntary Cleanup Act (Act 1042 of 1997, as amended) established the Brownfields Program and provides a streamlined process for the remediation and redevelopment of abandoned industrial or commercial properties that are contaminated or are perceived to be contaminated with hazardous constituents. ADEQ hopes to encourage the development of Brownfields as a sustainable land-use policy as an alternative to new development of Greenfields, or pristine properties, in the State of Arkansas. In December 2000, the EPA and ADEQ entered into a Memorandum of Agreement to support ADEQ's Brownfields Program and define the roles and responsibilities of EPA Region 6 and ADEQ. The rules and requirements of the program are outlined in APCEC Regulation No. 29 (Arkansas Pollution Control and Ecology Commission, 2006). Upon successful completion of the Brownfields Program, participants are provided limitations on liability for the eligible property.

===== Elective Site Cleanup Program =====
The ADEQ administers an Elective Site Cleanup Program, which allows responsible parties to enter into an agreement with ADEQ for cleanup of sites. The Elective Site Cleanup Program does not offer a release of liability but does offer participants a means to address historic contamination on their site without penalty and with known objectives. ADEQ is working to promote the Elective Site Cleanup Program in order to maximize cleanups of sites within the State. There is also a number of sites undergoing voluntary cleanup through Consent Administrative Orders.

===== Abandoned Mine Lands =====
The SMCRA created an Abandoned Mine Land (AML) fund to pay for the cleanup of mine lands abandoned before the passage of the statute in 1977. The law was amended in 1990 to allow funds to be spent on the reclamation of mines abandoned after 1977. The trust fund is financed by a fee assessed on every ton of coal mined in the country. A portion of AML fees are distributed to States with an approved reclamation program to fund reclamation activities. The SMRD currently uses state-of-the-art surveying and computer-aided design systems to perform the functions necessary to produce reclamation plans or the AML sites in Arkansas.

===== Underground Storage Tanks =====
The ADEQ Regulated Storage Tank Division drafts, administers, and enforces State regulations pertaining to underground storage tanks (USTs) as prescribed by 40 CFR 280, as well as aboveground petroleum storage tanks. There are approximately 13,000 regulated storage tanks located at over 5,600 active facilities across the State (Arkansas Department of Environmental Quality, 2012). These tanks are located primarily at retail gasoline and diesel sales facilities but may also include bulk petroleum storage facilities, private fleet-fueling facilities, and emergency generating stations. Prior to the mid-1980s, USTs had been regulated in a fragmented fashion by the Federal government through various environmental statutes. When studies revealed growing problems with a large number of tank systems, along with an alarming potential for future problems, the U.S. Congress mandated changes that were initiated by the States (U.S. Environmental Protection Agency, 1988). These standards focused on new tank system installation standards (for example, secondary containment), existing tank upgrades, registration requirements, closure requirements, and corrective action requirements. The controlling regulation for regulated storage tanks in Arkansas is the APCEC Regulation 12 (Arkansas Pollution Control and Ecology Commission, 2009).

The number of confirmed releases in Arkansas peaked in 2001 and has slowly declined since that time (Arkansas Department of Environmental Quality, 2012). Releases from USTs are required to be investigated, and those with groundwater impacts are required to have owners define the vertical and horizontal extent of contamination. Once defined, a Corrective Action Plan is implemented to mitigate the impact of contamination. The effectiveness of remediation normally is evaluated through groundwater monitoring.
