= Blessed Paul =

Blessed Paul may refer to:

- Paul Nzioki Mulwa
- Paul of Sandomierz
- Paul Joseph Nardini
- Paolo Manna
- Pavel Djidjov
- Pavel Peter Gojdič
- Pope Paul VI
