= Wellhead protection program =

US groundwater contamination law

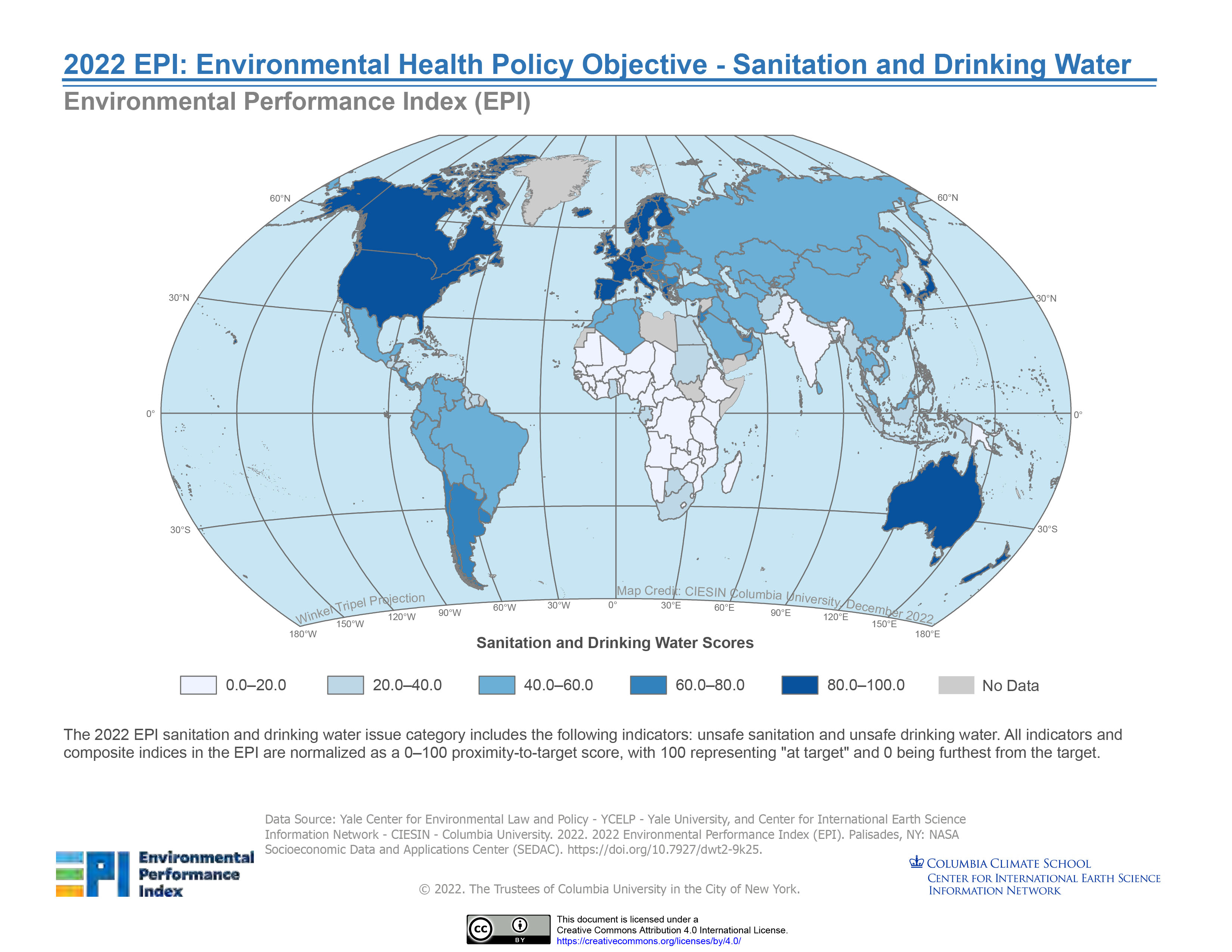
Global map depicting international sanitation and drinking water scores

The Wellhead Protection Program in the 1986 amendments to the Safe Drinking Water Act requires states to protect underground sources of drinking water from contaminants that may adversely affect human health. Over half of the U.S. population relies on groundwater for drinking water However, residential, municipal, commercial, industrial, and agricultural activities can all contaminate groundwater. In the event of contamination, a community's drinking water supply can develop poor quality or be lost altogether. Groundwater contamination occurs from products such as oil, chemicals, gasoline, or other toxic substances to infiltrate groundwater. These products can travel through soil and seep into the groundwater; this process can occur through landfills, septic tanks, mining sites, fertilization, etc. Groundwater contamination might not be detected for a long period of time and health problems can occur from drinking contaminated water. Cleanup of a contaminated underground source of drinking water may be impossible or so difficult it costs thousands or millions of dollars. The U.S. Congress requiring Wellhead Protection Programs by 42 U.S.C. § 300h–7 in the Safe Drinking Water Act applied the concept that it is better to prevent groundwater contamination than try to remediate it. U.S. Congress by 42 U.S.C. § 300h–7 requires identification of the areas that need implementation of control measures in order to protect public water supply wells from contamination as "wellhead protection areas". Communities can use the police power established by the Tenth Amendment to the U.S. Constitution to enforce zoning and subdivision regulations to protect drinking water sources. Thereby communities can direct development away from areas that would pose a threat to drinking water sources.

== Purpose ==
Public groundwater supply aquifers that can support a public water system are vital natural resources. According to an estimate by the U.S. Geological Survey 37% of public water comes from groundwater. The U.S. Geological Survey aquifer sampling for the National Water-Quality Assessment Program frequently found man-made contaminants at concentrations greater than human-health standards in public groundwater supply aquifers. The frequency of man-made contaminants in public water supply aquifers proves the vulnerability of these aquifers to inappropriate land uses. This vulnerability indicates the importance of wellhead protection. Wellhead protection is essential to have safe drinking water because the concentrations of many man-made carbon-containing contaminants are not decreased by commonly used drinking water treatment processes. Only by controlling the land uses of their public water source can a community control the quality of the water they drink. The U.S. Geological Survey aquifer sampling also frequently detected contaminants for which the U.S. Environmental Protection Agency has not yet established human health standards. Several Wikipedia articles involve the vulnerability of groundwater aquifers to contamination as follows:

- Aerojet
- Alabama Plating Company Superfund site
- American Brass Superfund site
- Camp Lejeune water contamination
- Capitol City Plume Superfund site
- Central Valley groundwater pollution
- Dukeville, North Carolina
- Hanford Site
- Hinkley groundwater contamination
- MTBE controversy
- Rocky Mountain Arsenal
- Raytheon
- Water contamination in Crestwood, Illinois
- Woburn, Massachusetts

== Wellhead protection requirements created by Congress ==
U.S. Congress determined the nation's community water supplies must be protected. The United States Code 42 U.S.C. § 300h–7 requires States protect their underground sources of drinking water (USDWs) by Wellhead Protection Programs. These Wellhead Protection Programs must specify the duties of State agencies, local governmental entities, and public water supply systems to develop and implement wellhead protections. Identification of the area that needs wellhead protection must be based on the hydrologic and geologic information on groundwater flow, recharge, and discharge. A community's Wellhead Protection Program must identify all man-made sources of contaminants in the wellhead protection area that may cause adverse health effects. There must be educational and control measures to protect the water supply from these identified sources of contaminants. There must also be a contingency plan for alternate drinking water supplies in the event of contamination. A community's Wellhead Protection Program must add in any new water well that serves a public water supply system. A demonstration program which protects designated aquifers is required. Additionally, EPA must impose monitoring requirements on water systems for contaminants which have not yet been regulated

The most beneficial aspects of introducing a Wellhead Protection Plan are the reliable drinking water sources for the future, and cost-savings. Developing a protection plan effectively prevents groundwater contamination, which saves the money that would potentially be spent on clean-up processes; clean-up methods can be 30-40 times more costly than prevention methods. Additionally, the plan's main goal is to secure safe drinking water for everyone. It is crucial to effectively manage wells now to preserve drinking water for the future.

== Adverse Effects on the Health of Persons ==
In 42 U.S.C. § 300h–7 U.S. Congress says each State shall "protect wellhead areas within their jurisdiction from contaminants which may have any adverse effect on the health of persons." The U.S. Environmental Protection Agency (EPA) says many microorganisms and chemicals have the potential to contaminate ground water. Bacteria and viruses can produce illnesses such as hepatitis, cholera, or giardiasis. High concentrations of nitrates can produce Methemoglobinemia or "blue baby syndrome". Gasoline contamination promotes the formation of cancer. Lead contamination causes learning disabilities in children as well as nerve, kidney, liver, and pregnancy problems. The EPA goes on to say, "Hundreds of other chemicals, however, are not yet regulated, and many of their health effects are unknown or not well understood. Preventing contaminants from reaching the ground water is the best way to reduce the health risks associated with poor drinking water quality." Public health agencies report waterborne disease outbreaks to the Center of Disease Control. During the period from 1971 to 2006, a majority (52.7%) of the 801 reported deficiencies involved the use of contaminated groundwater,

== Implications of Drinking Water Access and Consumption ==
Safe drinking water in several, typically rural, areas of the United States is a not so recent crisis within the Country. Most urbanized counties have access to clean, safe drinking water, however this is not the case in every county, especially states with a more rural landscape. There are over 150,000 public water systems in the United States, and a majority of the population, about 94%, relies on these systems for a portion of the water they use on a daily basis. The quality of drinking water is heavily correlated with the characteristics in source-water, which is extremely contaminated by human activity and pollution. The U.S. Safe Drinking Water Act gives the Environmental Protection Agency (EPA) oversight on these public water systems, and they are required to regulate the amount of contaminants in drinking water and source water. The Toxic Substances Control Act acknowledges over 80,000 unregulated chemicals that are used within the United States, posing an enormous threat to safe drinking water, and may be associated with health risks. These unregulated chemicals pose challenges for the EPA's approach of maintaining the safety of water within the public water systems.

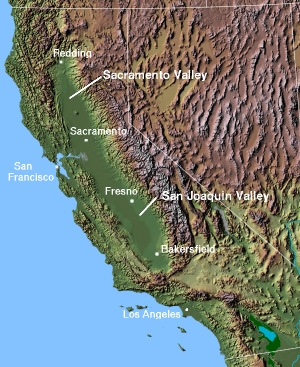
California's Central Valley

The State of California enacted the Safe and Affordable Drinking Water Fund in 2019 to target the drinking water systems that exposed over one million residents, primarily in the lower socioeconomic and agricultural areas of the Central Valley, to unsafe water. The goal of this act was to reduce the contaminants in drinking water and source water in community water sources. The Safe and Affordable Drinking Water Fund arises from the long-term issues of exposure to harmful contaminants, most experienced by those inhabiting the lower part of the Central Valley known as the San Joaquin Valley. Communities in the Valley with fewer economic resources are not only exposed to higher levels of arsenic from the environment, they are also being supplied with drinking water systems that have maximum contamination level violations. A majority of where violations to the Safe Drinking Water Act primarily occur in water systems that serve smaller areas. Lower socioeconomic status individuals and minority groups are associated with an increase in and repeated drinking water violations.

== Societal and Justice Impacts of Contaminated Drinking Water ==
As previously referenced, a majority of individuals who lack safe drinking water represent marginalized communities. There is a sociodemographic pattern of racial, economic, and geographic disparities which represent a safe water supply. The safe and equal access to water is a fundamental right for all individuals, however, there is an increasingly large number of individuals and communities in the United States who continue to be stripped of this right and face a water crisis. Historically, there has been and continues to be a disproportionate access to safe drinking water for underprivileged, underpopulated, and underrepresented communities. For example, redlining began in the 1930s, which allowed Home Owner Loan Corporations to divide neighborhoods based on housing stock. People of color or lower income households were deemed "high risk," resulting in denial from mortgage loans and causing house foreclosures. Due to the encouragement of redlining, these impacted communities were forced to live in areas with less advancements for water and wastewater infrastructures. With urbanization accelerating at a quick rate, it is crucial to take into consideration the access to safe water that still must be provided for all communities.

Lower-income areas and communities of color are impacted unequally by the water crisis in the United States. This consequently exposes these social groups to higher levels of pollutants in both the air and water. More exposed individuals are susceptible to potential health problems. A majority of those exposed are typically in poverty, resulting in a financial burden to seek necessary resources for proper water disposal systems, sewage treatment, and safe drinking water. Additionally, water in lower income communities has tested for higher levels of nitrate and arsenic, which has come from soil and water runoff.

== National Regions Most Susceptible to Contaminated Drinking Water ==
Contaminated drinking water poses a large threat to communities' public health, and several vulnerability factors, which include community water sources and demographic characteristics, are heavily associated with violations to the Safe Drinking Water Act and its amendments outlined in the Wellhead Protection Program. Identifying the violations between "hot spots", spatial clusters of health based violations, and vulnerability factors allows for public policies to be enforced and target the reasons the community water sources get contaminated. Rural areas of the country are heavily impacted by violations to community water sources, and coliform violations are most prevalent in the West and Midwest regions of the country. In addition, low income, minority communities face higher rates of violations in their community water sources including coliform. Similarly, areas which have urbanized at an accelerated rate and are densely populated are more vulnerable to drinking water hazards. Throughout the nation, over 21 million people that rely on their community's water sources have experienced safe drinking water violations on health based quality standards. As of 2022, 4.1 million Americans still did not have access to safe drinking water and basic sewage treatment. The lack of treatment resulted in roughly 900 billion gallons annually of untreated sewage to infiltrate the U.S. water ways.

== Control measures ==

Communities evaluate the properties of the aquifer to determine the sensitive areas that need to be protected by local land use zoning. When land use zoning is based on competent scientific evidence to support wellhead protection, land use zoning has been upheld by courts. Communities direct the location of potential sources of contamination to areas outside of sensitive wellhead protection areas to ensure their underground source of drinking water (USDW) remains uncontaminated. For example, a community successfully blocked a proposed $12 million travel plaza/welcome center from endangering their water supply by local land use zoning that prohibits petroleum underground storage tanks (USTs) in a wellhead protection area.

Federal, State, and local agencies with regulatory and funding power can also limit development to areas outside sensitive wellhead protection areas. By project approvals and by funding authorizations these agencies can control the location of roads, water lines, and wastewater lines that are essential for intensive development.

To protect underground sources of drinking water (USDWs), the U.S. Congress requires Federal agencies by 42 U.S.C. § 300j–6 to comply with Wellhead Protection Programs and Underground Injection Control (UIC) Programs. Actions such as forestry management plans, pipelines, highways, etc. with federal control that may result in contamination of water supplies in wellhead protection areas must comply with Wellhead Protection Programs and Underground Injection Control Programs.

== Primarily local government enforcement ==
The EPA says most local governments can protect underground sources of drinking water by establishing and enforcing zoning regulations. For example, a state court supported a community's denial of a variance from their land use ordinances prohibiting installation of underground petroleum storage tanks in a wellhead protection area. The court found the installation of underground petroleum storage tanks might cause substantial damage to the public good and would be contrary to the community's zoning code.

Several Federal statutes also relate to groundwater protection such as the Safe Drinking Water Act; the Resource Conservation and Recovery Act; the Comprehensive Environmental Response, Compensation, and Liability Act; Superfund Amendments and Reauthorization Act; the Clean Water Act; and the Federal Insecticide, Fungicide, and Rodenticide Act. For example, after a U.S. Geological Survey dye trace study identified the potential contamination risks in the Biscayne Aquifer were far greater than previously considered, a U.S. District Court applied the Clean Water Act (CWA) to deny permits for mining in order to protect public and private drinking water wells:

. . . the CWA specifically provides that unacceptable adverse effects on municipal water supplies are sufficient grounds for denial of a 404(b) permit. 33 U.S.C. § 1344(c). The implementing regulations of the CWA also direct that the Corps consider water quality and water supply issues (as part of the "Public Interest Review"). 33 C.F.R. § 320.4(a)(1)[141].

Even if the water treatment plants are able to treat the raw water for the anticipated amounts of benzene, it is nevertheless of grave concern that benzene will now regularly affect a previously pristine Aquifer.^{[58]} The ability to cure a problem does not justify its creation.

[58] . . . While the Corps previously, and perhaps erroneously, concluded that those projects "would be of no risk to the drinking water resource," it is unclear what the level of risks are to the neighboring residential communities which may use private wells to tap into the Aquifer for drinking water or other purposes.

. . . this Court has "taken a long while to come to a short conclusion:" these permits should not have issued.^{[322]} And,, the activities pursuant to these permits should not continue. These activities should not have been permitted in the first instance if the Corps had been conducting the level of analysis mandated by the CWA, ESA, NEPA, and APA, and the relevant regulatory guidance.

Contamination of an underground source of drinking water (USDW) may be a legal injury suffered by the public subject to court action. Even if the source of contamination had a permit for its operation that may not avoid groundwater contamination liability. The liability and high costs of groundwater cleanup can cause businesses to abandon problem sites leaving significant long-term financial losses to the community. Businesses want to locate in communities that protect their water supplies in order to avoid paying taxes to clean up someone else's multimillion-dollar contamination.

== Protection of a public trust ==
In 1987 the New Jersey Superior Court says that the public trust doctrine applies to the protection of drinking water sources:

While the original purpose of the public trust doctrine was to preserve the use of the public natural water for navigation, commerce and fishing, Arnold v. Munday, 6 N.J.L. 1, 69-78 (Sup.Ct. 1821), it is clear that since water is essential for human life, the public trust doctrine applies with equal impact upon the control of our drinking water reserves. The Supreme Court has determined that "It is appropriate to consider the unique nature of water." K.S.B. Tech. Sales v. No. Jersey Dist. Water Supply, 75 N.J. 272 (1977). Ultimate ownership rests in the people and this precious natural resource is held by the state in trust for the public benefit. Borough of Neptune City v. Borough of Avon-by-the-Sea, 61 N.J. 296 (1972).

In 2008 the Vermont legislature revised statute "Title 10, Chapter 048: Groundwater Protection" saying "the groundwater resources of the State are held in trust for the public" and "the groundwater resources of the State shall be managed to minimize the risks of groundwater quality deterioration by regulating human activities that present risks to the use of groundwater". In applying this statute the Vermont Superior Court said:

By its nature, the public trust imposes on the state a "special obligation to maintain the trust for the use and enjoyment of present and future generations."

U.S. Congress by the National Environmental Policy Act 42 U.S.C. § 4331(a) recognizes it is not acceptable to abuse renewable natural resources that would prevent their use by future generations. The role of the Federal government in water resources is shifting from resource development to environmental protection and water conservation.

== Related ==
=== Underground Injection Control ===
The Underground Injection Control (UIC) Program prohibits and regulates underground injections or discharge that could endanger Underground Sources of Drinking Water (USDWs). These injections are categorized as either hazardous or non-hazardous liquid and gas. For shallow injection wells, the U.S. Environmental Protection Agency has found that storm waters directed into Class V injection wells contain many contaminants in concentrations above the drinking water standards or health advisory limits.

=== Environmental Protection Agency's emergency power ===
By 42 U.S.C. § 300i Congress gives the Environmental Protection Agency's Administrator emergency power to "take such actions as he may deem necessary in order to protect the health of" consumers of public water. This emergency power applies to preventing contamination of all Underground Sources of Drinking Water (USDWs). This includes USDWs future generations may need for public water and private wells.

=== Sole Source Aquifer ===
Under the Safe Drinking Water Act of 1974 (Public Law 93-523, 42 U.S.C. 300 et. seq), an aquifer can be designated as a Sole Source Aquifer if the aquifer supplies at least 50% of a community's drinking water and there is no alternative drinking water source. With this designation there can be no federal financial assistance for any project which the Environmental Protection Agency Administrator determines may contaminate the aquifer so as to create a significant hazard to public health.

=== Source Water Quality Assessment ===
States identify all the potential contaminate sources that might affect their surface and underground public water supplies for the Source Water Quality Assessment Program of 42 U.S.C.§ 300j–13.

== See also ==
- Land use
- National Rural Water Association
- Public trust doctrine
- Stormwater
- Walkerton E. coli outbreak
- Water quality
- Waterborne diseases
- Water resources law
- Water resource management
