= Zhivko Dimitrov =

Executed Bulgarian serial killer

- Born: Zhivko Hristov Dimitrov; 1946; Tolbuhin, Dobrich Province, People's Republic of Bulgaria (present-day Dobrich, Bulgaria)
- Died: 1981 (aged 34–35); Tolbuhin, Dobrich Province, People's Republic of Bulgaria
- Cause of death: Execution by shooting
- Conviction: Murder x6
- Penalty: Death

Details
- Victims: 6
- Span of crimes: 1975–1981
- Country: Bulgaria
- State: Dobrich
- Date apprehended: February 1981

Zhivko Hristov Dimitrov (Bulgarian: Живко Христов Димитров; 1946 – 1981) was a Bulgarian serial killer and former police officer who killed six people in Dobrich Province from 1975 to 1981 in order to steal their money. Arrested shortly after committing a triple murder, he was convicted, sentenced to death and subsequently executed after confessing to all of the crimes.

== Early life ==
Little is available about Dimitrov's life. Born in Tolbuhin (present-day Dobrich) in 1946, he entered the police force and eventually managed to reach the rank of Major of the local police department's First Regional Division. According to former colleagues and people who knew him, he was known to be a very arrogant, egotistical individual who threatened everybody who slighted him for even the smallest of things.

== Murders ==
Dimitrov committed his first murder sometime during the autumn of 1975 when he invited a man named Lyuben Yankov to his father's house in Tolbuhin. He lured Yankov to the basement, where he closed the door and shot him in the back with his service pistol. When pressed for a motive, Dimitrov claimed that he thought he was carrying a certain sum of money with him so that he could buy back a cassette player that had been confiscated by agents from the border patrol. When he failed to find any such money, he dragged the corpse to the yard and dumped Yankov's body down the well. Two weeks later, Dimitrov called some health inspectors to take samples from the well, and after finding that it had some unexplained bacterial infection, the well was sealed off. For unclear reasons, the workers failed to do a proper search and did not detect the presence of human remains.

In the spring of 1976, Dimitrov got in contact with a man named Sebaydin Bayraktarov, who was known to possess many different types of electronic devices. Thinking that he could maybe steal some of them, Dimitrov lured him to a wellhead protection area near the village of Branishte, where he shot him in the head with his service pistol. He then doused Bayraktarov's body in benzine and set it on fire, before finally burying the remains. He later claimed to have reported him missing, but authorities were unable to locate Bayraktarov.

Little information is available about his third victim, a woman named Zekiya Kerimova. In his later confessions, Dimitrov claimed that he had noticed that she had approximately 3,000 leva in her passbook and wanted to steal them. To do so, he lured her to the same wellhead protection area and killed her in a similar manner to Bayraktarov before burying her body. The exact year the killing was carried out is, at present, unclear.

=== Triple murder ===
In the late hours of 10 February 1981, Dimitrov went to a department store in Tolbuhin and relieved the two officers tasked with guarding the two employees present there. Acting under the guise of official business, Dimitrov told the clerks - two women named Pasha and Vlaika - that he wanted to measure how much time it would take to drive them from the store to the nearest bank, and whether it required the use of an automobile. As he was a high-ranking officer from the First Regional Division, the clerks trusted him and took with them the bag containing the store's savings, amounting to approximately 100,000 leva. The trio then got into his car, a blue Moskvitch, and started their journey, but along the way, Dimitrov claimed that he had to make a detour so he could fill the car's gas tank.

What exactly transpired next is unclear - one theory claims that he shot one of the women at a traffic stop then drove to the wellhead protection area and killed the other, while another claims that both were killed there. Regardless of where he had killed them, Dimitrov then called his friend Sebaydin (unrelated to the previous victim) and asked if he could borrow his Fiat, ostensibly so he could travel to Varna. Sebaydin then picked him and Dimitrov's girlfriend Pepa up, before he drove to the location designated by his friend. When they arrived, he was mortified to see the two women's corpses, but before he could do anything, Dimitrov pulled out his service pistol and shot him. He then put Sebaydin's body in the driver's seat, took off his golden watch and placed it on the dead man's wrist whilst taking off his and the women's scarves. Dimitrov then doused the scarves in benzine, put them in the car's reservoir, set them on fire and fled together with his girlfriend. When asked why he did this later on, Dimitrov claimed that since Sebaydin resembled him physically, he hoped that investigators would confuse the charred remains as being his and thus would exclude him as a possible perpetrator while he fled overseas.

== Investigation and arrest ==
Unbeknownst to Dimitrov, the scarves were extinguished in some way - possibly from the strong wind - preventing the car from exploding and burning the three victims' remains. The grisly crime scene was accidentally discovered on the following day by two traffic policemen passing by the area, who immediately notified local authorities. Once they identified the car as belonging to Dimitrov, they questioned some acquaintances who confirmed that he was involved in some suspicious activity and had recently left town, along with his girlfriend. Due to this, a nationwide warrant was issued for his arrest.

In the meantime, Dimitrov had travelled to Varna and given most of the money to Pepa, telling her to get in contact with him via the telephone later on. He then took a train from Sindel to Hisarya, where he hid in a boarding house. For the next few weeks, he travelled regularly to Plovdiv and attempted to get into contact with his girlfriend, but without any response. He then successfully arranged a meeting in Varna with another female friend of his, but was recognized by an officer while on the train and was subsequently arrested.

Not long after, Dimitrov was interrogated about the triple murder. Knowing that he faced the mandatory death penalty, he confessed to the other three murders in an attempt to gain leniency from the court, but the prosecutors still pursued it nonetheless. After months of preparations, the trial lasted only three days and Dimitrov was found guilty on all counts. Justice Georgi Pavlov rejected his plea for clemency and he was thus sentenced to death. While the exact date is unclear, Dimitrov's appeals were all denied and he was executed later that same year.

After the trial's conclusion, an internal review resulted in two deputy chiefs and several other employees from the Ministry of Interior being fired for their mishandling of the case. In 2020, Dr. Dimcho Kalev, the coroner who performed the autopsies on Dimitrov's murder victims, briefly discussed the case in an interview about his career in his native Bulgaria and while working abroad in South Africa.

== See also ==
- List of serial killers by country
- List of people executed in Bulgaria
