= Josaphat Chichkov =

Bulgarian priest and Catholic blessed

Robert-Matthew Chichkov (9 February 1884 – 11 November 1952) was a Bulgarian priest, rector and teacher, executed by firing squad by the ruling communist government. He is venerated as blessed by the Catholic Church.

== Life ==
He came from a large and fervent Latin Church Catholic family. He entered the Assumptionist high school seminary in Adrianopolis and entered the Assumptionist novitiate in Phanaraki, Turkey in 1900. His religious name was Josaphat. He was ordained a priest in the Latin rite in Malines, Belgium, in 1909 after studying philosophy and theology at Louvain University.

Once back in Bulgaria, he taught at St. Augustine College in Plovdiv and at St. Michael College in Varna. Later he moved to Yambol where he served as superior and rector of the high school seminary of Saints Cyril and Methodius, as pastor of the local Latin rite parish, and as chaplain to the Oblate Sisters of the Assumption. Open to technology and science, he was the first in the city to have a Cyrillic typewriter. Mgr Angelo Roncalli (the future Pope John XXIII) was Apostolic Visitor to Bulgaria from 1925 to 1934) and would often visit and rest at the seminary.

In 1937 he was appointed provincial superior and returned to the college in Varna where he served as rector and teacher. He was responsible for enlarging the Yambol seminary to include seminarians of both rites, Latin and Byzantine-Slav, and found ways to integrate students into one community. He organized fundraising activities for the institution and taught French to teachers, civil servants, and Bulgarian army officers. He had introduced a ham radio and movie projector at the seminary. When the communists arrived in 1948, foreign priests were forced to leave Bulgaria, and he was also appointed parish priest at the Latin parish of Varna.

== Arrest ==
Josaphat Chichkov was arrested in December 1951, Accused of being a spy and scheming to start an imperialistic war against Russia, and Bulgaria. After what international organizations universally considered a show trial which began on 29 September 1952 and ended with a guilty verdict and a death sentence on 3 October, Fr. Chickov, two of his Assumptionist companions, Fr. Kamen Vitchev and Fr. Pavel Djidjov, and a Passionist bishop, Most Rev. Eugene Bossilkov, were executed by firing squad on the grounds of the prison in Sofia at 11:30 p.m. the evening of 11 November 1952.

Fr. Chichkov was declared a martyr for the faith and beatified by Pope John Paul II in Plovdiv on 26 May 2002.

On 28 July 2010 the Bulgarian National Assembly passed a law officially rehabilitating all of those who had been condemned by the People's Republic of Bulgaria in 1952, including Fr. Chichkov.

== Sources ==
- Guissard, Lucien. The Assumptionists: From Past to Present, Bayard Publications, 2002 (ISBN 1-58595-207-9).
- Gallay, Pierre. The Martyrdom of the Three Bulgarian Assumptionists, Bayard Service Edition, 2002.
- Royal, Robert. The Catholic Martyrs of the Twentieth Century: A Comprehensive World History, The Crossroad Publishing Company, New York, 2000 (ISBN 0-8245-1846-2).
- Holzer, Bernard and Michel, Jean-Baptiste, Les Rideaux Rouges de Sofia, Editions Bayard, 2003 (ISBN 2227472219).
