= Kamen Vitchev =

20th-century Bulgarian Catholic priest

Blessed Kamen Vitchev
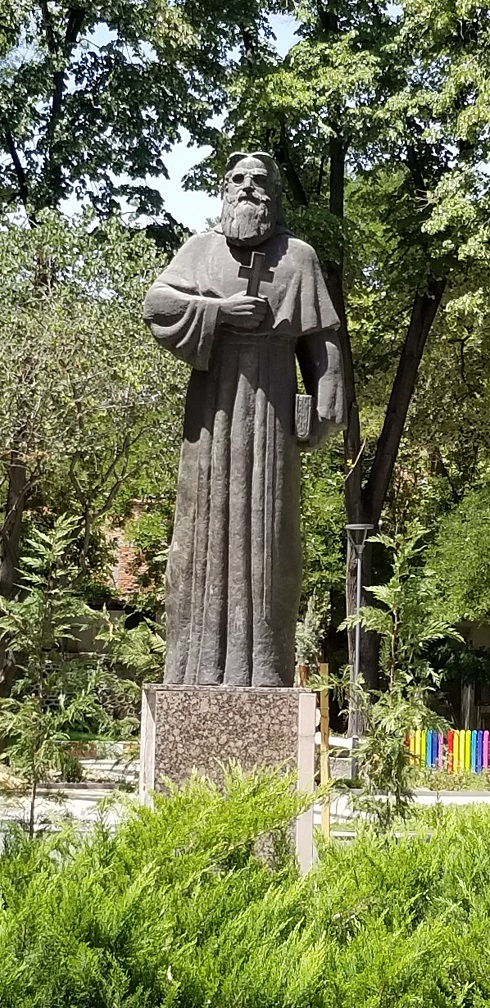

Martyr
- Born: May 23, 1893; Topolovgrad, Bulgaria
- Died: November 11, 1952 (aged 60); Bulgaria
- Venerated in: Catholic Church
- Beatified: May 26, 2002, Plovdiv, Bulgaria by John Paul II
- Feast: 13 November
- Attributes: Assumptionist habit, book of hours, cross

Peter Vitchev, also known as Kamen Vitchev, was a Bulgarian Eastern Catholic and an Assumptionist priest who was martyred by the Bulgarian communist regime. He was beatified by Pope John Paul II on 2002.

== Biography ==
=== Early life and priesthood ===
Vitchev was born on May 23, 1893, near Topolovgrad, Bulgaria and came from a peasant Eastern Orthodox family. In 1903 he was accepted into the grammar school of Kara-Agatch in Adrianopoli. In 1910, he joined the Congregation of the Augustinians of the Assumption, beginning his novitiate in Gempe, Belgium, and taking the religious name Kamen. He made his final profession in 1912 in Limperzberg.

He then commenced his studies of philosophy and theology in Louvain, Belgium, where he remained until 1918. He was ordained a priest of the Eastern Rite in Constantinople on 22 December 1921. After a brief period teaching at St. Augustine College in Plovdiv, Bulgaria and at a high school seminary in Kumkapı, Turkey, he returned to Strasbourg and Rome, to complete his studies and obtained a doctorate in theology in 1929.

=== Bulgarian communist regime ===
Very knowledgeable in the history of the Bulgarian church, Vitchev published several articles in the review known as Échos d'Orient. In 1930 he was appointed professor of philosophy and dean of studies at St. Augustine College in Plovdiv and maintained this position until the school was closed by the Communist regime on August 2, 1948.

After this prestigious institution founded and maintained by the Assumptionists was closed, Vitchev became superior of the Assumptionist seminary in Plovdiv which housed a small number of students. That same year all foreign members of religious orders were expelled and Vitchev was named Vicar-Provincial of the remaining Bulgarian Assumptionists. They numbered 20 and staffed 5 Eastern Catholic and 4 Latin Church parishes.

=== Death ===
As a Soviet satellite, Bulgaria suffered from the wave of anti-Catholic legislation that swept the bloc in the years after World War II (e.g. the arrest of Archbishop Aloysius Stepinac in Yugoslavia in 1946, of Cardinal József Mindszenty in Hungary in 1948, of Archbishop Josef Beran in Czechoslovakia in 1950, and of Cardinal Stefan Wyszyński in Poland in 1953).

Highly esteemed and respected by the influential young graduates of St. Augustine College, Vitchev posed a threat to the Communist authorities in Bulgaria and was arrested on July 4, 1952 accused of conspiring against the communist state. After what international organizations universally considered a show trial which began on September 29, 1952, and ended with a guilty verdict and a death sentence on October 3, Vitchev, two of his Assumptionists companions, Josaphat Chichkov and Pavel Djidjov, and a Passionist bishop, Eugene Bossilkov, were shot to death, without public notice, at approximately 11:30 PM the evening of November 11, 1952.

== Beatification ==
Vitchev was declared a martyr for the faith and beatified by Pope John Paul II in Plovdiv on May 26, 2002. During his homily, Pope also honored the memory of those of the Orthodox Church who suffered martyrdom under the same Communist regime.

On July 28, 2010, the Bulgarian parliament passed a law officially rehabilitating all of those who had been condemned by the People's Republic of Bulgaria in 1952, including Vitchev.

== Sources ==
- Guissard, Lucien. The Assumptionists: From Past to Present, Bayard Publications, 2002 (ISBN 1-58595-207-9).
- Gallay, Pierre. The Martyrdom of the Three Bulgarian Assumptionists, Bayard Service Edition, 2002.
- Royal, Robert. The Catholic Martyrs of the Twentieth Century: A Comprehensive World History, The Crossroad Publishing Company, New York, 2000 (ISBN 0-8245-1846-2).
- Holzer, Bernard and Michel, Jean-Baptiste, Les Rideaux Rouges de Sofia, Editions Bayard, 2003 (ISBN 2227472219).
- Pope John Paul II, homily delivered in Plovdiv, Bulgaria, May 26, 2002.
