= Sokrat Kirshveng =

Bulgarian serial killer

- Born: Sokrat Albert Kirshveng c. 1882; Аlino, Sofia Province, Principality of Bulgaria
- Died: April 14, 1937 (aged 54–55); Sofia, Sofia City Province, Kingdom of Bulgaria
- Cause of death: Execution by hanging
- Other names: "The Killer with the Adze" "The Lover with the Adze"; Shakir
- Conviction: Murder
- Penalty: Death

Details
- Victims: 4
- Span of crimes: 1919–1937
- Country: Bulgaria
- States: Sofia City, Sofia
- Date apprehended: 1937

Sokrat Albert Kirshveng (Bulgarian: Сократ Албърт Киршвенг; c. 1882 – April 14, 1937), known as The Killer with the Adze (Bulgarian: Убиецът с теслата), was the first recorded Bulgarian serial killer. Between 1919 and 1937, he murdered two of his wives, his aunt and her husband, also attempting to murder his third wife. He was hanged for his crimes on April 14, 1937.

== Biography ==
=== Early life ===
Sokrat Albert Kirshveng was born circa 1882 in the village of Alino, to a Romani Bulgarian mother and father of Greek descent. He was born with a slight defect in one of his shoulders. His parents died when he was very young, and the young orphan was sent to Samokov, where he began work as an apprentice and later a journeyman for a local lumberjack, before becoming a master in the trade himself. Kirshveng was considered a dapper man among his colleagues, wearing suits from the latest Parisian fashion and Viennese bow-ties, as well as having varnish shoes imported from Argentina.

In 1908, he married Elena Manova in Samokov, who later gave birth to two children - Alexander and Raina. However, Kirshveng disliked the small-town life and his job, so he abandoned his family and traveled to Sofia, promising to come back with lots of money. There he met Vangelia Yordanova, a tailor who occasionally worked for the hospital. She immediately fell for him, and she allowed him to live with her in her small house in the Modern Suburbs behind the Sugar Factory, unaware that Kirshveng had a family back in Samokov. In 1917, he was hired as a security guard at "10th Military Hospital", and thus given a service weapon. While working there, he fell in love with one of the hospital orderlies - Tinka Nikolova. She was a young and beautiful woman, but also highly religious, and refused Kirshveng's offers for marriage as she knew he was "married" to Yordanova. In response to this, the cunning man devised a plan to get rid of his cohort.

=== Murder of Vangelia Yordanova ===
One day, Kirshveng returned home from work, seemingly panicked. He explained to his lover that he had stolen a large sum of money from the hospital, and that his scheme would soon be discovered. Yordanova then offered that both of them flee from the country, and, taking the chance offered, Kirshveng accepted. He instructed Yordanova to write two letters, one to her mother, and one to him. In the former, she explained to her mother that she had stolen 15,000 leva from her lover and had fled to Serbia, while in the latter, Kirshveng had to show it to the authorities and claim that the woman had robbed him. In the meantime, she would actually have to go to Serbia, where she would wait for Kirshveng.

He had promised her that they would flee together to Dalmatia, where they would live happily, but they first had to retrieve the money, which he said was buried at the cemetery in Malashevtsi. On the night of July 12, 1919, the duo took a shovel and spade and went to the burial spot to dig up the loot. Kirshveng then explained that he was tired from working all day, and asked Yordanova to dig instead. The woman, completely unaware that she was digging her own grave, dug for about an hour before Kirshveng, when he decided that the hole was deep enough, took out his service weapon and shot her in the back of the head, burying her body afterwards.

The following day, the "widower" appeared in the hospital with watery eyes, explaining to Nikolova that Yordanova had scammed him and fled with a lover to Serbia. Over the next few days, Kirshveng walked around like an apparition in the facility, constantly repeating "Vangelia fled with a lover." This way, he won over Nikolova's love, and she agreed to marry him. However, he confessed to her that he had a wife back in Samokov, with whom he hasn't been divorced yet. Instead, he convinced her that his mother was a Muslim, and offered that they both get married by the Turkish mufti in town. Nikolova agreed, and then both of them married, accepting the Islamic faith and renaming themselves Shakir and Aishe.

=== Murder of Elena Manova ===
Despite his newfound love, the thought of his wife and children back in Samokov troubled Kirshveng's mind, deciding that he would get rid of her as well. Later that same year, he hired a cart driver named Dimitar Tsvetkov to drive him to Samokov, where he told his family that they were going to go live with him in the capital. On the way back, near the village of Pancharevo, Kirshveng told the driver that he and Manova would go on a walk to a nearby path, and Tsvetkov then took off with the children to the capital. Under the guise of showing her his newly bought cherry garden, he tricked Manova into going towards the bushes, where he killed her using his adze. After a short while, the driver returned, but noticed that Kirshveng was alone. The man then explained that his wife had decided to spontaneously visit some relatives in a nearby village for one or two days. Unsuspecting, the driver believed his story and drove him home, with Kirshveng managing to put the bloodied adze in the backside of the cart. When they arrived at their destination, Kirshveng immediately went to the police and blamed Tsvetkov for killing his wife. After the authorities found the bloodied weapon, the court sentenced the innocent cart driver to death and later hanged him.

=== Attempted murder, arrest and imprisonment ===
Kirshveng then continued to live with Aishe, but soon he got tired of her, and decided to kill her as well. He then took her out on a walk towards a path in Gorna Banya, and when they reached a suitable, isolated place, he began strangling the woman. However, she managed to scream loud enough for people to hear her, and thus, police were summoned, Kirshveng was captured and sentenced to death.

However, the judge considered the fact that if the man was executed, his children would become orphans without a dime, and so, his sentence was commuted to 17 years imprisonment. During this time, Kirshveng was employed as the prison's lumberjack, and managed to financially support his children this way.

=== Double murder and second arrest ===
Kirshveng was released in 1937, but was left penniless. He then visited his aunt Evtimiya, sister of his father, who held a small shop in Sofia's Poduyane district, claiming that he had borrowed 2 leva from her which he wanted to return. The woman took the money, and when she turned to take out some sweets with raspberry flavor to give to Kirshveng's children, he killed her using an axe he had taken with him. Kirshveng then scoured the shop, finding only 20 leva, which didn't satisfy him. Because of this, he went upstairs to his aunt's apartment, but also didn't find any money there.

In one of the rooms, Evtimiya's 85-year-old husband, Ivan Zdravkov, was sleeping. Kirshveng burst into the room, threatening the old man to give him money or else he would kill him. Zdravkov then took out his wallet and showed that he only had 2 leva left. However, Kirshveng noticed that he had a golden pocket watch, an honorary gift from Zdravkov's service as a volunteer during the Battle of Shipka Pass. When the man fought back, he was killed with the axe. The bloodied Kirshveng then took the watch and a few other items he thought he could sell, put up a sign saying that the shop would be closed for 10 days, and promptly left.

One of the regular customers, however, became suspicious, as the shop worked without days off. She contacted the police, who inspected the home and found the two bodies, with no clues to whom the killer might have been. One of the investigators noticed that Zdravkov's pocket watch was missing, and began asking the local watchmakers if there had been anybody who had sold one recently. Eventually, he came across a pawn shop owner who claimed that he had been sold exactly the same type of watch two days ago, "probably stolen", and gave a description of the man. Kirshveng already had a dossier with pictures of him, and when the investigators showed them to the man, he instantly recognized him. The killer was soon arrested.

== Trial, sentence and death ==
The trial against the "Killer with the Adze" began on February 22, 1937. The case brought in a huge crowd of people, eager to see the face of the horrible monster. Kirshveng's attorney was the jurist Milyo "The Balm" Balsamov, who was famous for going to extreme lengths to pardon every recidivistic criminal he represented. The murderer's confession to the magistrates lasted three hours, in which he admitted to being a sadist and requested the harshest penalty for murdering his aunt and his uncle-in-law, saying:

"Give me it, if there is nobody to do it, I'll do it myself!"

Kirshveng was sentenced to death by hanging the following day. His attorney, however, hated losing, and appealed the sentence to the Supreme Court of Cassation of Bulgaria. Both the appeal and the request for pardon were subsequently denied. Kirshveng was executed on the night between April 13 to 14, 1937, with his only requests prior being that he was buried a Christian and that his children never learn that he had murdered their mother.

After his execution, the guards found a note in his cell, which read:

"I should've died earlier, so I couldn't commit a new murder."

== See also ==
- List of serial killers by country
- List of people executed in Bulgaria
