= Safe Drinking Water Act =

1973-1974 US environmental legislation

- Long title: An Act to amend the Public Health Service Act to assure that the public is provided with safe drinking water, and for other purposes
- Nicknames: SDWA
- Enacted by: the 93rd United States Congress
- Effective: December 16, 1974

Citations
- Public law: Pub. L. 93-523
- Statutes at Large: 88 Stat. 1660 (1974)

Codification
- Titles amended: 42
- U.S.C. sections created: 42 U.S.C. § 300f et seq.

Legislative history
- Introduced in the Senate as S. 433 by Warren Magnuson (D–WA) on January 18, 1973; Committee consideration by Senate Commerce, House Commerce; Passed the Senate on June 22, 1973; Passed the House on November 19, 1974 (296-84 as H.R. 13002) with amendment; Senate agreed to House amendment on November 26, 1974 () with further amendment; House agreed to Senate amendment on December 3, 1974 (); Signed into law by President Gerald Ford on December 16, 1974

Major amendments
- Safe Drinking Water Act Amendments of 1986; Safe Drinking Water Act Amendments of 1996; America's Water Infrastructure Act of 2018

The Safe Drinking Water Act (SDWA) is the primary federal law in the United States intended to ensure safe drinking water for the public. Pursuant to the act, the Environmental Protection Agency (EPA) is required to set standards for drinking water quality and oversee all states, localities, and water suppliers that implement the standards.

The SDWA applies to every public water system (PWS) in the United States. There are currently over 148,000 public water systems providing water to almost all Americans at some time in their lives. The Act does not cover private wells (in 2020, 13% of US households were served by private wells).

The SDWA does not apply to bottled water. Bottled water is regulated by the Food and Drug Administration (FDA), under the Federal Food, Drug, and Cosmetic Act.

== National Primary Drinking Water Regulations ==
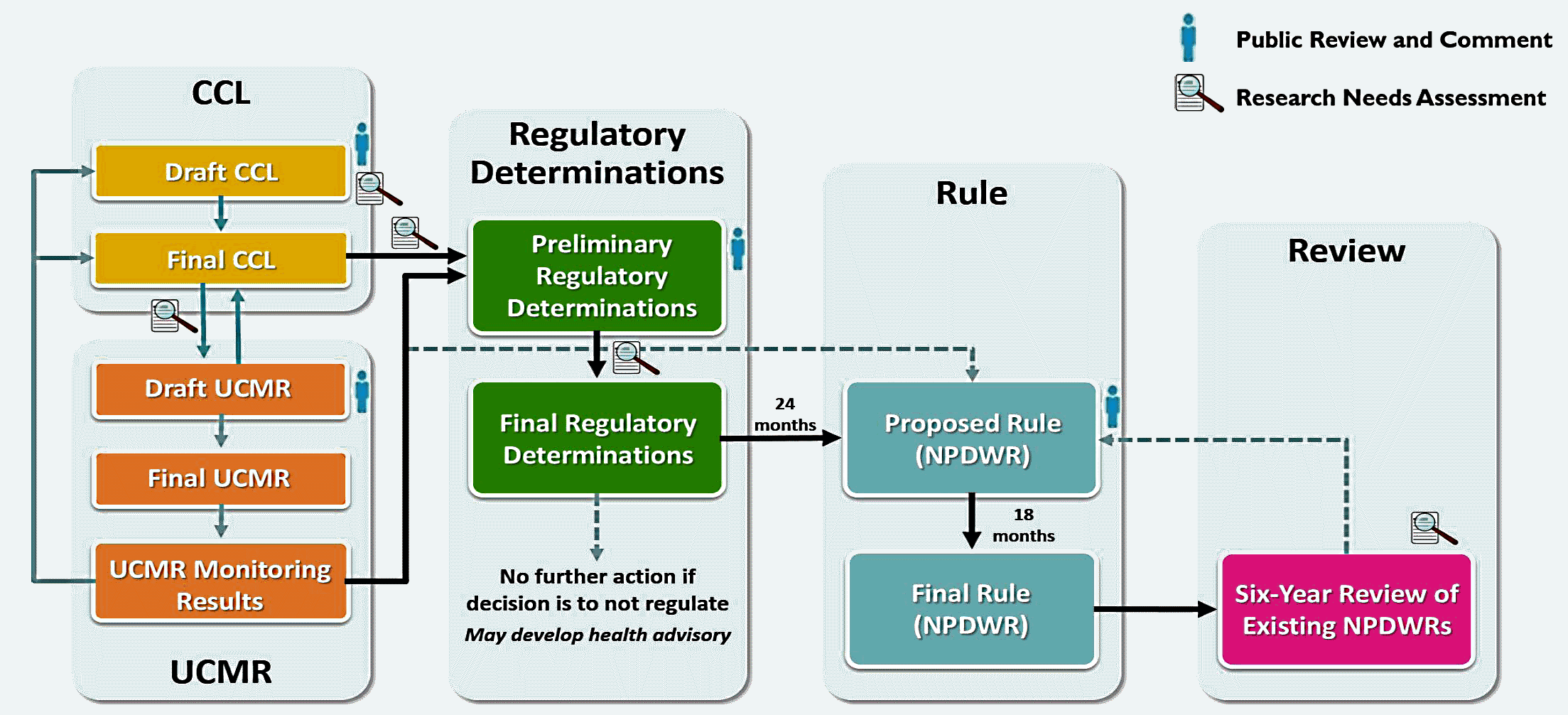
Chart of Regulatory Analysis Processes under the SDWA

The SDWA requires EPA to establish National Primary Drinking Water Regulations (NPDWRs) for contaminants that may cause adverse public health effects.

The regulations include both mandatory requirements (Maximum Contaminant Levels, or MCLs; and Treatment Techniques) and nonenforceable health goals (Maximum Contaminant Level Goals, or MCLGs) for each included contaminant. As of 2019 EPA has issued 88 standards for microorganisms, chemicals and radionuclides.

MCLs have additional significance because they can be used under the Superfund law as "Applicable or Relevant and Appropriate Requirements" in cleanups of contaminated sites on the National Priorities List.

For some contaminants, EPA establishes a Treatment Technique (TT) instead of an MCL. TTs are enforceable procedures that drinking water systems must follow in treating their water for a contaminant.

Federal drinking water standards are organized into six groups:

- Microorganisms
- Disinfectants
- Disinfection byproducts
- Inorganic chemicals
- Organic chemicals
- Radionuclides.

=== Microorganisms ===
EPA has issued standards for Cryptosporidium, Giardia lamblia, Legionella, coliform bacteria and enteric viruses. EPA also requires two microorganism-related tests to indicate water quality: plate count and turbidity. The agency issued its initial Surface Water Treatment Rule in 1989, to address contamination from viruses, bacteria and Giardia lamblia. The most recent amendment is the Long Term 2 Enhanced Surface Water Treatment Rule, promulgated in 2006, requiring public water systems to employ a Treatment Technique to control Cryptosporidium and other pathogens.

=== Disinfectants ===
EPA has issued standards for chlorine, monochloramine and chlorine dioxide.

=== Disinfection by-products ===
EPA has issued standards for bromate, chlorite, haloacetic acids and trihalomethanes.

=== Inorganic chemicals ===
EPA has issued standards for antimony, arsenic, asbestos, barium, beryllium, cadmium, chromium, copper, cyanide, fluoride, lead, mercury, nitrate, nitrite, selenium and thallium.

==== "Lead Free" plumbing requirements ====
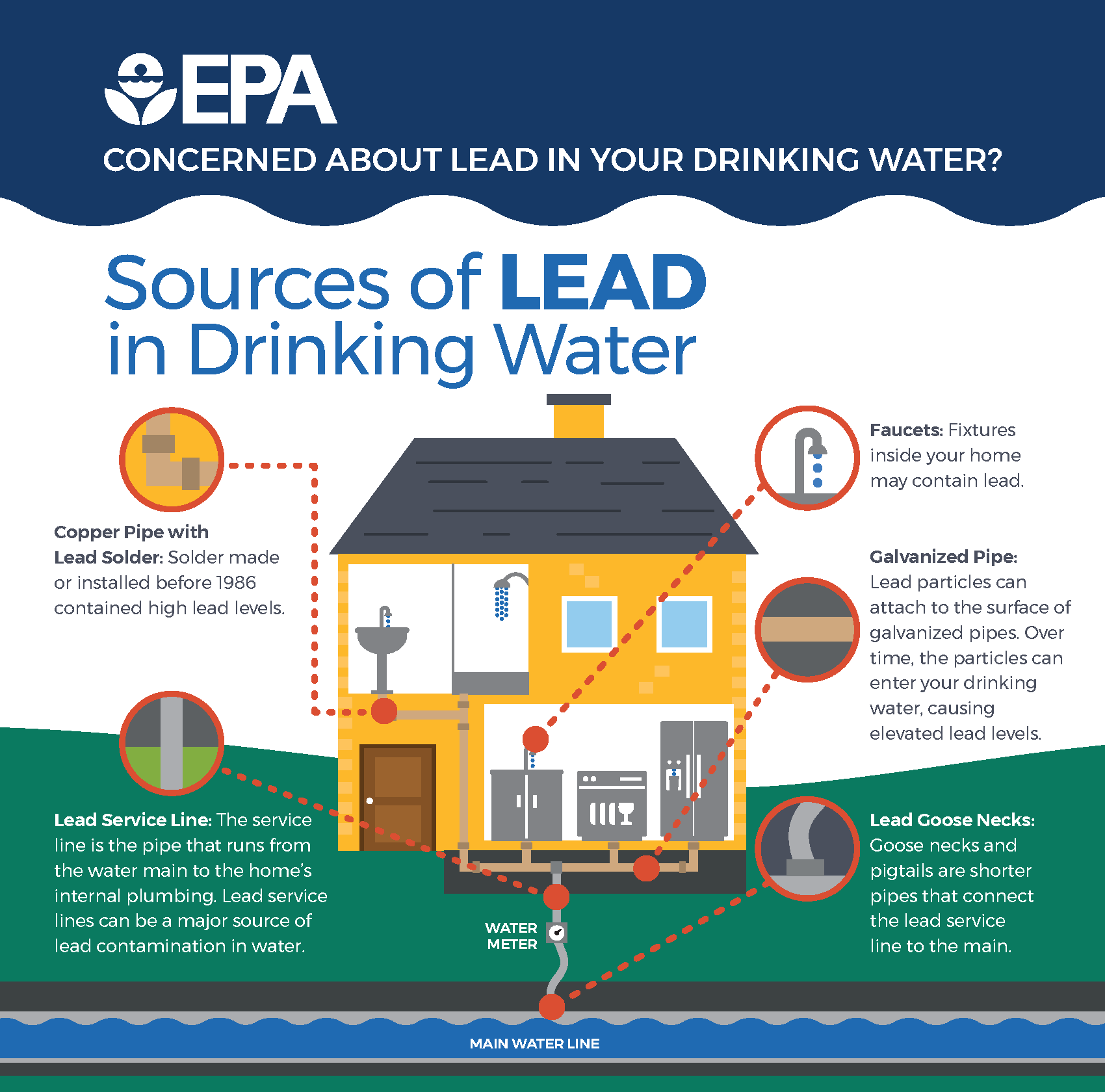
EPA illustration of lead sources in residential buildings

The 1986 amendments require EPA to set standards limiting the concentration of lead in public water systems, and defines "lead free" pipes as:

(1) solders and flux containing not more than 0.2 percent lead;
(2) pipes and pipe fittings containing not more than 8.0 percent lead; and
(3) plumbing fittings and fixtures as defined in industry-developed voluntary standards (issued no later than August 6, 1997), or standards developed by EPA in lieu of voluntary standards.

EPA issued an initial lead and copper regulation in 1991. The regulation specifies a Treatment Technique rather than an MCL.

Congress tightened the definition of "lead free" plumbing in a 2011 amendment to the Act. EPA published a final rule implementing the amendment on September 1, 2020.

In response to the Flint, Michigan water crisis, EPA published revisions to the Lead and Copper Rule on January 15, 2021 addressing testing, pipe replacement and related issues. The rule mandates additional requirements for sampling tap water, corrosion control, public outreach and testing water in schools. Several citizen and environmental groups immediately filed lawsuits challenging the rule. Following the lawsuit, EPA issued its final "Lead and Copper Rule Improvements" regulation on October 8, 2024, which requires the removal of all lead pipes within ten years. Additionally, the regulation lowers the action level of lead contamination to 10ppb from the current limit of 15ppb.

=== Organic chemicals ===
EPA has issued standards for over 53 organic compounds, including benzene, dioxin (2,3,7,8-TCDD), PCBs, styrene, toluene, vinyl chloride and several pesticides.

==== Perfluorinated alkylated substances ====
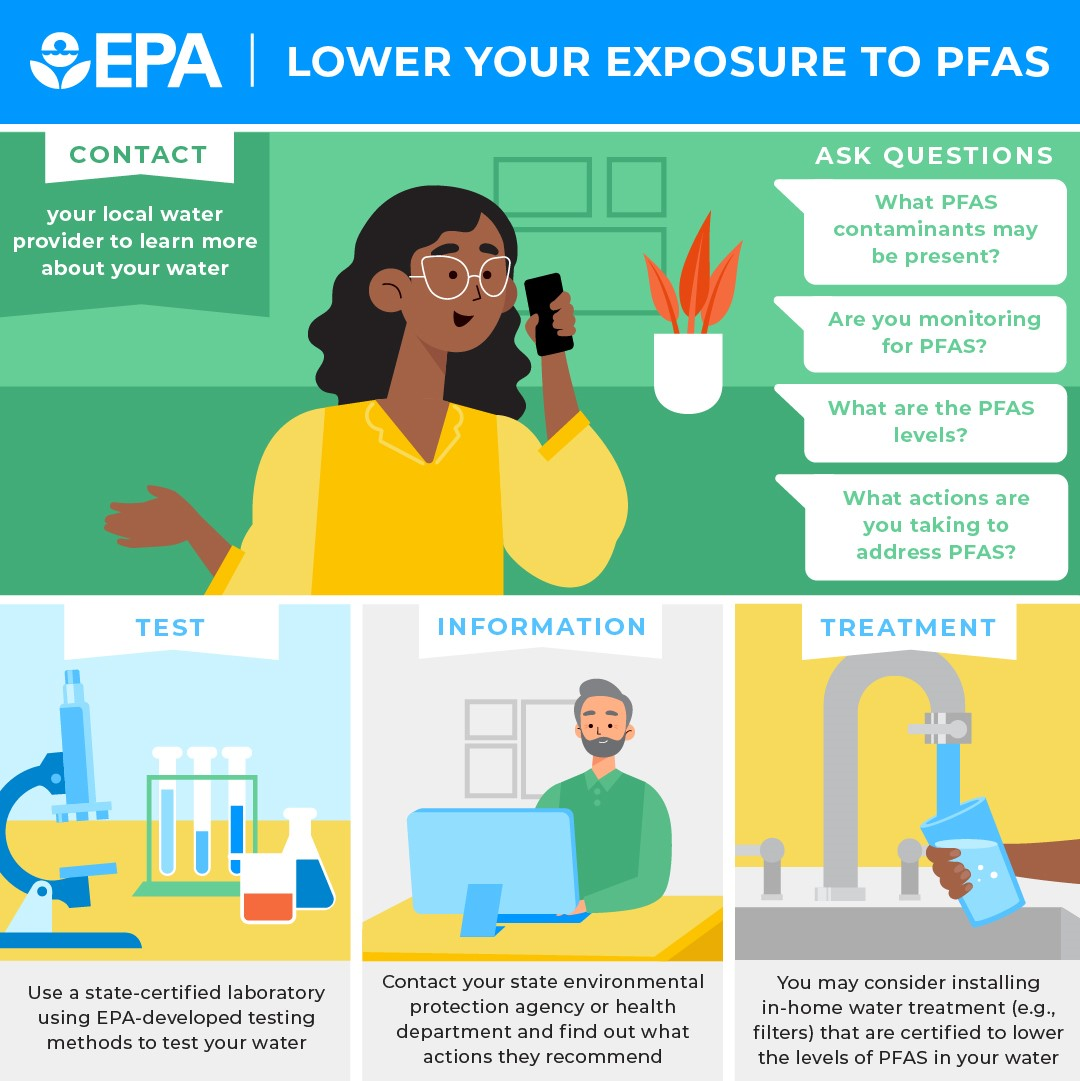
EPA graphic about PFAS

In March 2021 EPA announced that it would develop regulations for perfluorooctanoic acid (PFOA) and perfluorooctanesulfonic acid (PFOS). In April 2024 EPA published final standards for PFOA, PFOS, perfluorohexanesulfonic acid (PFHxS), perfluorononanoic acid (PFNA), hexafluoropropylene oxide dimer acid (also known as GenX) and perfluorobutanesulfonic acid (PFBS). The agency is providing grant funds to assist small and disadvantaged communities in testing for and treating PFAS contamination in their water systems.

=== Radionuclides ===
EPA has issued standards for alpha particles, beta particles and photon emitters, radium and uranium. EPA proposed regulations for radon in 1991 and 1999.

== Secondary standards ==
Secondary drinking water standards are non-regulatory guidelines for aesthetic characteristics, including taste, color, and odor.

== Health advisories ==
EPA issues "health advisories" for some contaminants; some of which have not been regulated with MCLs. Health advisories provide technical information to public health officials about health effects, methods for chemical analysis, and treatment methods. The advisories are not enforceable. EPA was given explicit authority to issue advisories in the 1996 SDWA amendments. As of 2022, health advisories have been issued for the following contaminants.

EPA Drinking Water Health Advisories
Chemical Contaminants	Microbial Contaminants
Boron	Cyanotoxins
Dacthal (DCPA) and Dacthal degradates	Cryptosporidium
2,4- and 2,6- Dinitrotoluene (DNT)	Legionella
Fluoride	Giardia
GenX	Mycobacteria
Manganese	
Methyl tert-butyl ether (MTBE)	
Oxamyl	
Perchlorate	
Perfluorooctanoic acid (PFOA) and Perfluorooctane sulfonate (PFOS) (published 2022)*	
Perfluorobutanesulfonic acid (PFBS)	
Sodium	
Sulfate	
1,1,2,2-Tetrachloroethane	
* Note: In 2024 EPA stated that its 2022 advisories for PFOA and PFOS were outdated. Updated toxicity assessments were published concurrently with the final 2024 regulation.	

== State standards ==
The SDWA allows states to set standards which are more stringent than the federal standards, and to issue standards for contaminants that EPA has not regulated. Several states have issued their own standards for a few contaminants, including fluoride, perchlorate and perfluorinated alkylated substances (PFAS).

== Future standards ==
=== Unregulated contaminants ===
The SDWA requires EPA to identify and list unregulated contaminants which may require regulation. The Agency must publish this list, called the Contaminant Candidate List (CCL) every five years. EPA is required to decide whether to regulate at least five or more listed contaminants. EPA uses this list to prioritize research and data collection efforts, which support the regulatory determination process.

As of 2024, EPA has developed five CCLs:

- CCL1: 50 chemical and 10 microbiological contaminants/contaminant groups were listed in 1998. In 2003 EPA made a determination that no regulatory action was needed on nine of these contaminants.
- CCL2: EPA carried forward the remaining 51 contaminants from CCL1 for consideration in 2005. In 2008 EPA determined that no regulatory action was needed on 11 of these contaminants.
- CCL3: EPA revised its listing process, based on recommendations from the National Research Council and the National Drinking Water Advisory Council (a Federal Advisory Committee). It expanded its initial review to 7,500 potential chemical and microbial contaminants, and subsequently narrowed this universe to a list of 600 for further evaluation. 104 chemicals or chemical groups and 12 microbiological contaminants were listed in 2009. In 2011 EPA announced it would develop regulations for perchlorate, which had been listed beginning with CCL1. In 2016 EPA determined that no regulatory action was needed on four other listed contaminants, and delayed determination on a fifth contaminant, in order to review additional data.
- CCL4: EPA carried forward the CCL3 contaminants for which determinations had not been made, and requested public comment on additional contaminants. 97 chemicals or chemical groups and 12 microbial contaminants were listed in 2016. In March 2021 EPA announced that it would develop regulations for two of the CCL4 contaminants: PFOA and PFOS.
- In November 2022 EPA published CCL5. The list includes 66 chemicals, three chemical groups (including PFAS) and 12 microbes.

EPA requested public comment on its draft of the 6th CCL in 2023.

On December 27, 2021 EPA published a regulation requiring drinking water utilities to conduct monitoring for 29 PFAS compounds and lithium. The data are to be collected during 2023 to 2025. EPA will pay for the monitoring costs for small drinking water systems (those serving a population of 10,000 or fewer). The agency may use the monitoring data to develop additional regulations.

=== Perchlorate ===
The Natural Resources Defense Council (NRDC) filed a lawsuit in 2016 to accelerate EPA's regulatory process on perchlorate. Following a consent decree issued by a federal district court in New York, EPA published a proposed rule on June 26, 2019, with a proposed MCL of 0.056 mg/L.

In 2020 EPA announced that it was withdrawing its 2019 proposal and its 2011 regulatory determination, stating that it had taken "proactive steps" with state and local governments to address perchlorate contamination. In September 2020 NRDC filed suit against EPA for its failure to regulate perchlorate, and stated that 26 million people may be affected by perchlorate in their drinking water. Following a court order, EPA published a proposed rule for perchlorate on January 6, 2026. The order requires the agency to issue a final rule in 2027.

== Monitoring, compliance and enforcement ==
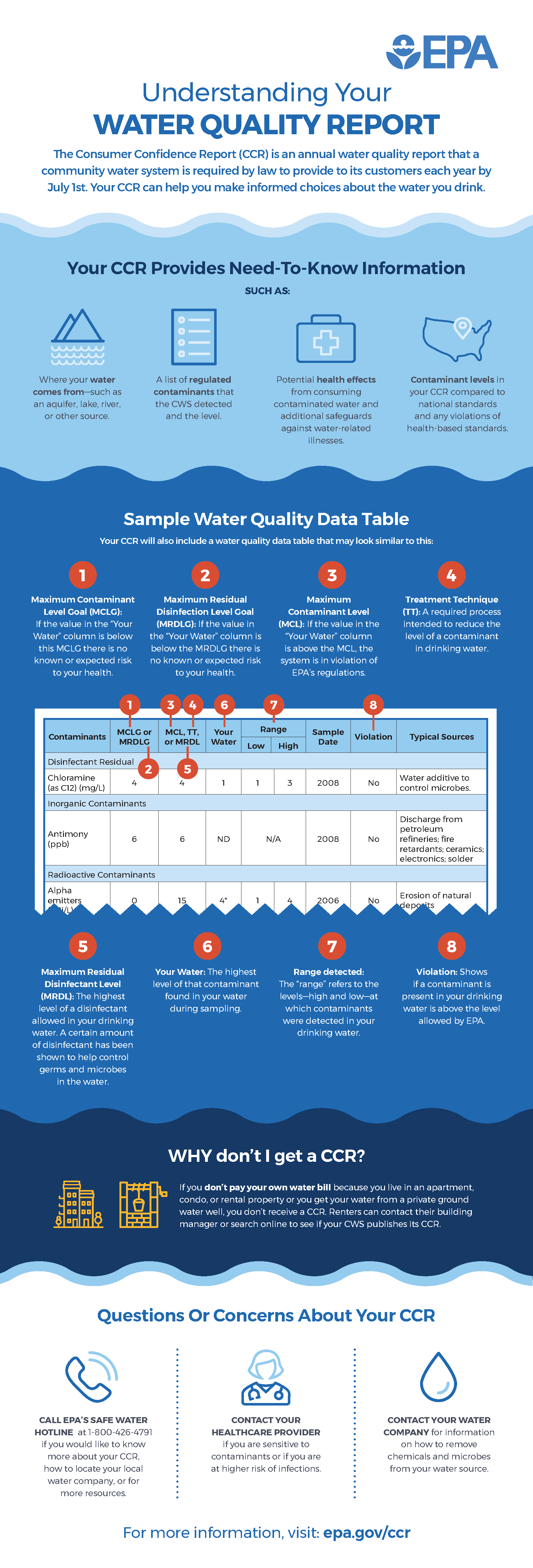
EPA graphic explaining Consumer Confidence Reports

Public water systems are required to regularly monitor their water for contaminants. Water samples must be analyzed using EPA-approved testing methods, by laboratories that are certified by EPA or a state agency.

A PWS must notify its customers when it violates drinking water regulations or is providing drinking water that may pose a health risk. Such notifications are provided either immediately, as soon as possible (but within 30 days of the violation) or annually, depending on the health risk associated with the violation. Community water systems—those systems that serve the same people throughout the year—must provide an annual "Consumer Confidence Report" to customers. The report identifies contaminants, if any, in the drinking water and explains the potential health impacts.

The Public Water System Supervision Program comprises "primacy" agencies, which are either state government agencies, Indian tribes, or EPA regional offices. All state and territories, except Wyoming and the District of Columbia, have received primacy approval from EPA, to supervise the PWS in their respective jurisdictions. A PWS is required to submit periodic monitoring reports to its primacy agency. Violations of SDWA requirements are enforced initially through a primacy agency's notification to the PWS, and if necessary following up with formal orders and fines.

== Protection of Underground Sources of Drinking Water ==
An underground source of drinking water (USDW) means an aquifer with sufficient quality and quantity of ground water to supply a public water system now or in the future.

=== Underground Injection Control (UIC) Program ===
The SDWA prohibits any underground injection which endangers drinking water sources. The Ninth Circuit United States Court of Appeals while enforcing this prohibition of "harmful injections into drinking water aquifers" explains that underground injection of even clean water can result in the illegal movement of a fluid containing a contaminant into an USDW:

The SDWA and its implementing regulations are not concerned with whether an injected fluid is itself contaminated. Rather, they are concerned with the result of "injection activity." A permit applicant must show that the proposed activity will not allow "the movement of fluid containing [a] contaminant." Id. Injections of clean water into the ground can cause the movement of contaminants into an aquifer. For example, contaminants may dissolve into clean water as the injected water passes through the soil on its way to an aquifer.

Underground fluid injection can have disastrous consequences for drinking water and, in turn, for human health. Injected fluid is hard to trace once it enters the ground, and polluted aquifers are hard to remediate. Congress' cautious "preventive" approach requires permit applicants to show that their injections will not harm underground sources of drinking water. It presumes, until an applicant shows otherwise, that injections will contaminate an USDW. Although this approach may result in forbidding some injections that would not contaminate an USDW, it is a valid exercise of Congress' authority.

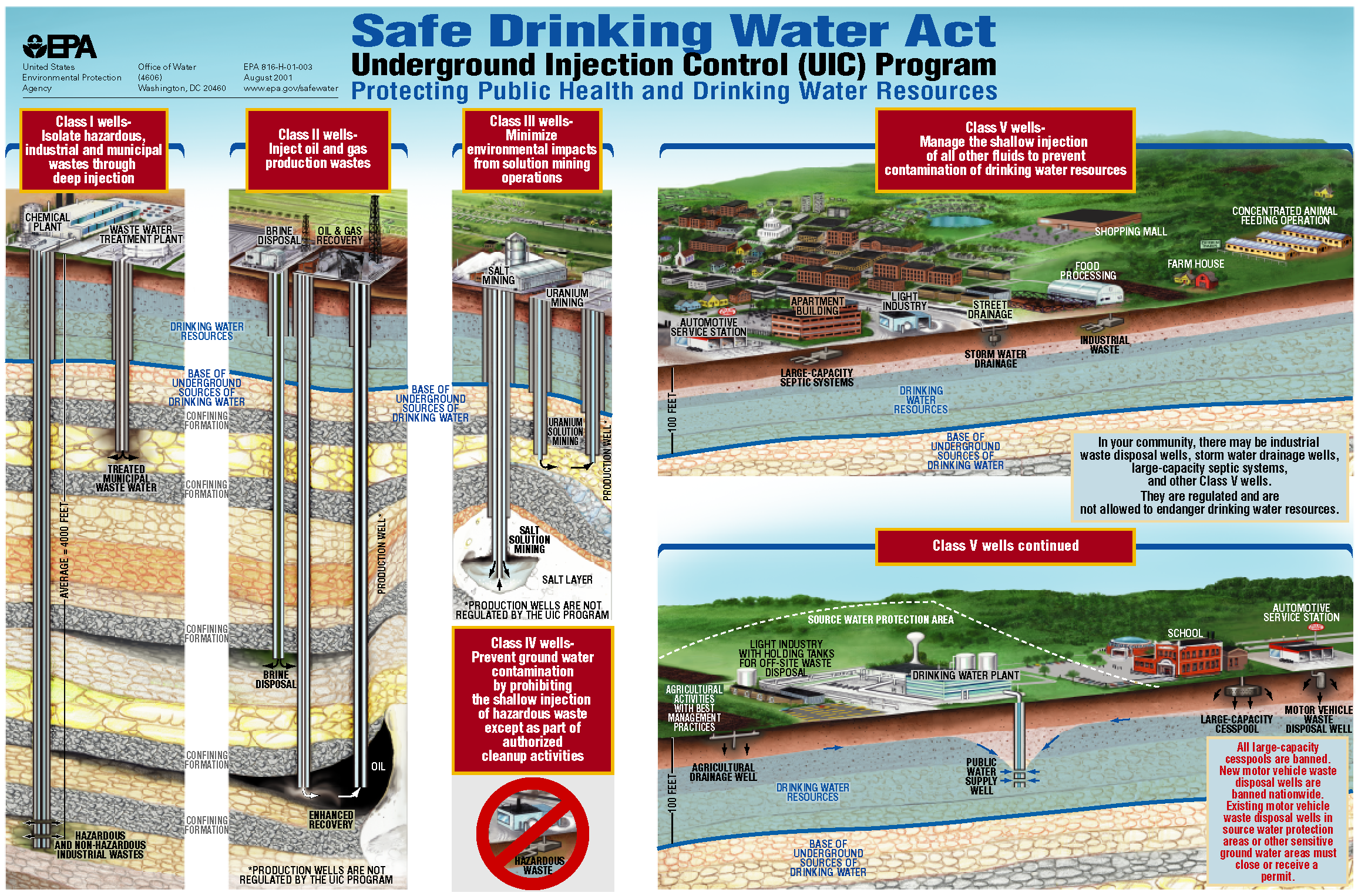
EPA poster illustrating UIC well classes

The 1974 SDWA authorized EPA to regulate injection wells in order to protect underground sources of drinking water. The UIC permit system is organized into six classes of wells.

- Class I. Industrial waste (hazardous and non-hazardous) and municipal wastewater disposal wells
- Class II. Oil and gas related injection wells (except wells solely used for production; see Hydraulic fracturing exemption)
- Class III. Solution mining wells
- Class IV. Shallow hazardous and radioactive waste injection wells (no longer permitted)
- Class V. Wells that inject non-hazardous fluids into or above underground sources of drinking water
- Class VI. Geologic sequestration wells for carbon dioxide.

EPA has granted UIC primacy enforcement authority to 34 states for Class I, II, III, IV and V wells. Seven additional states and two tribes have been granted primacy authority for Class II wells only. EPA manages enforcement of Class VI wells directly.

If a state does not take appropriate enforcement action then EPA must issue an order requiring a violator to comply with the requirements, or the agency will initiate a civil enforcement action. The SDWA directly provides for citizen civil actions.

==== Hydraulic fracturing exemption ====
Congress amended the SDWA in 2005 to exclude hydraulic fracturing, an industrial process for recovering oil and natural gas, from coverage under the UIC program, except where diesel fuels are used. This exclusion has been called the "Halliburton Loophole". Halliburton is the world's largest provider of hydraulic fracturing services. The measure was a response to a recommendation from the Energy Task Force, chaired by Vice President Dick Cheney in 2001. (Cheney had been Chairman and CEO of Halliburton from 1995 to 2000.)

=== Wellhead protection areas ===
The act requires states to establish wellhead protection programs to protect underground sources of drinking water. Wellhead protection programs must specify the duties of agencies, determine the wellhead protection areas, identify sources of contaminants, implement control measures to protect the wellhead protection areas, and a contingency plan for alternative drinking water supplies in the event of contamination. Federal agencies having jurisdiction over potential sources of contaminants must comply with all requirements of the state wellhead protection program.

=== Emergency power ===
The "Updated Guidance on Invoking Emergency Authority Under Section 1431 Of The Safe Drinking Water Act" shows that 42 U.S.C. § 300i gives the EPA Administrator broad power to protect public water systems and underground sources of drinking water (USDWs). This guidance encourages more widespread use of the EPA's emergency powers. This emergency power is granted when the Administrator receives "information that a contaminant which is present in or likely to enter a public water system or an underground source of drinking water ... which may present an imminent and substantial endangerment to the health of persons" and that appropriate agencies have not acted. Since this emergency power protection applies to all USDWs it includes potential future supplies of public water and even private wells. The imminent endangerment includes contaminants that lead to chronic health effects that may not be realized for years such as lead and carcinogens. To prevent harm from occurring the EPA Administrator may issue administrative orders or commence civil actions even without absolute proof.

=== Judicial review and civil actions ===
Whenever EPA finds a violation of the UIC Program and the State does not or cannot act, the agency must issue an administrative order or to file a civil action to require compliance.

A citizen can file a petition for judicial review of EPA final actions. A citizen may also file against any violator of the SDWA or against EPA for failure to take action under the SDWA which is not discretionary. EPA emergency administrative orders are also final actions subject to judicial review.

== Related programs ==
=== Airline water supplies ===
In 2004, EPA tested drinking water quality on commercial aircraft and found that 15 percent of tested aircraft water systems tested positive for total coliform bacteria. EPA published a final regulation for aircraft public water systems in 2009. The regulation requires air carriers operating in the U.S. to conduct coliform sampling, management practices, corrective action, public notification, operator training, and reporting and recordkeeping. An airline with a non-complying aircraft must restrict public access to the on-board water system for a specified period.

=== Source water assessment ===
The SDWA requires each state to delineate the boundaries of areas that public water systems use for their sources of drinking water—both surface and underground sources. Within each source area the origins of regulated contaminants are identified in order to determine the susceptibility of the public water systems. This information can help communities understand the risks to their sources of drinking water.

=== Whistleblower protection ===
The SDWA includes a whistleblower protection provision. Employees in the US who believe they were fired or suffered another adverse action related to enforcement of this law have 30 days to file a written complaint with the Occupational Safety and Health Administration.

== History ==
=== Prelude ===
Prior to enactment of the SDWA there were few national enforceable requirements for drinking water. In 1914 the U.S. Public Health Service (PHS) published a set of drinking water standards, pursuant to existing federal authority to regulate interstate commerce, and in response to the 1893 Interstate Quarantine Act. As such the standards were directly applicable only to interstate common carriers such as railroads. For local drinking water utilities, these standards were basically recommendations and not enforceable requirements. However, many municipal utilities began to voluntarily adopt the standards.

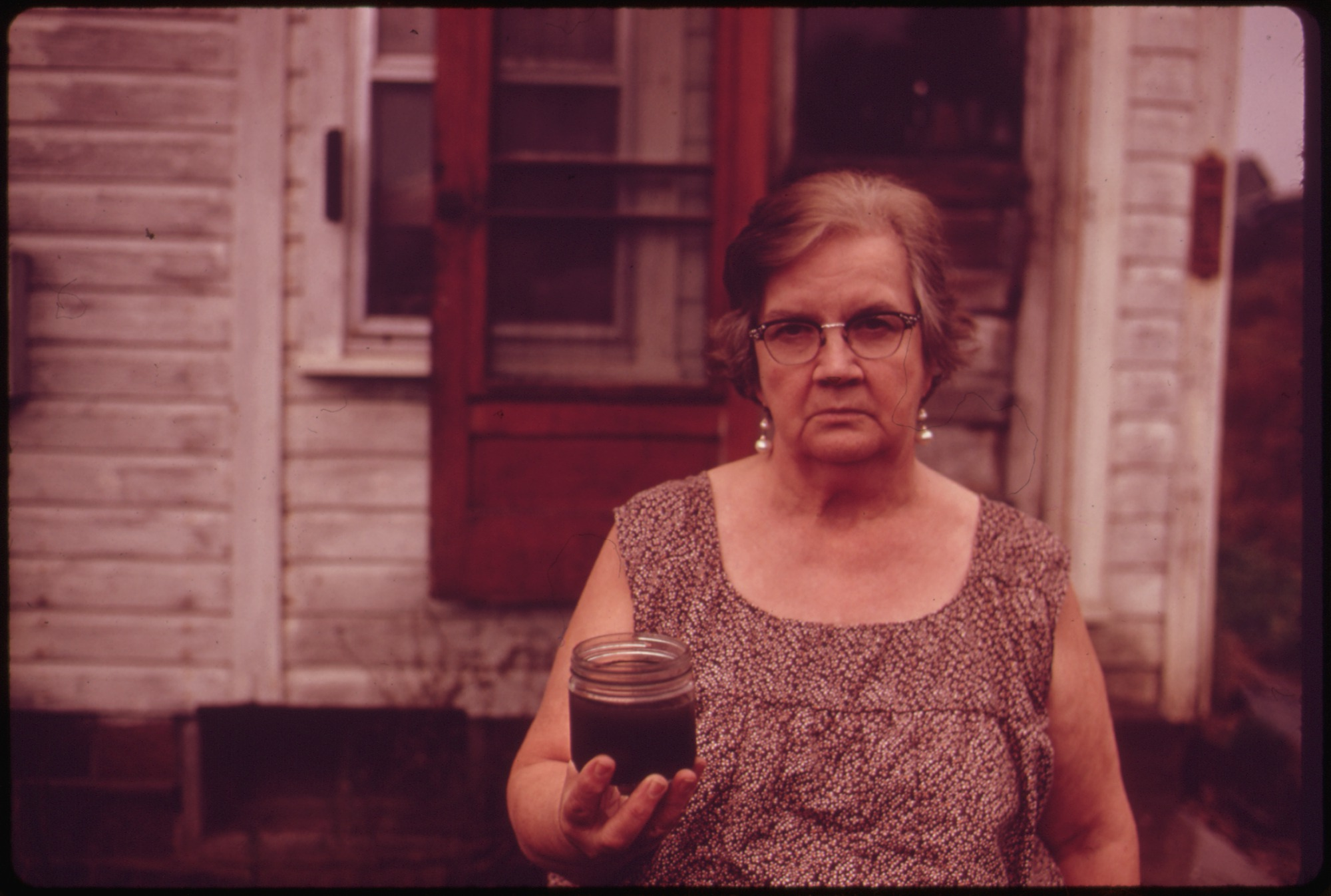
Mary Workman holds a jar of undrinkable water from her well, in 1973. She filed a damage suit against the Hanna Coal Company, Steubenville (Jefferson County, Ohio).

In the 1960s and early 1970s growing concerns about public health emergencies connected to tainted drinking water led to the passage of the SDWA. During this time reports emphasized the prevalence of waterborne illnesses brought on by bacteria and viruses found in public water systems. Unregulated water supplies had been linked to high-profile cases of cancer, gastrointestinal disorders and other serious illnesses. Public alarm was heightened when industrial pollutants like lead, nitrates and synthetic chemicals were found in drinking water. The risk of contamination had increased, a result of the additional strain that urbanization and population growth had placed on water resources. Scientists, public health officials and environmental advocacy groups stepped up their calls for national standards to guarantee safe drinking water. The need to develop a legislative framework that addressed the urgent need for safe drinking water throughout the United States was highlighted by the mounting pressure on Congress.

Improvements in chemical testing methods in the 1970s, particularly for synthetic organic chemicals, allowed for the detection of smaller concentrations of contaminants. Within existing state water management programs, some water works managers had mistakenly believed that the major, real threats were behind them and their primary focus was on providing consistent and effective service through aging infrastructure, with major efforts at maintaining the bacteriological quality of drinking water.

=== Legislative History ===
On January 3, 1973, a Safe Drinking Water Act bill was introduced in the House of Representatives by Paul Rogers. Companion legislation was introduced in the Senate on January 18, 1973.

- 01/03/1973, Introduced in House
- 01/18/1973, Introduced in Senate
- 03/8-09/1973, Hearing, Subcommittee on Public Health and Environment, Committee on Interstate and Foreign Commerce. House
- 05/31/1973, Hearing, Subcommittee on Environment, Committee on Commerce. Senate
- 06/20/1973, Committee Report, Committee on Commerce. Senate
- 06/22/1973, Amendment & passage, Senate Floor
- 01/29-30/1974, Hearing, Subcommittee on Environment, Committee on Commerce. Senate
- 02/21/1974, Introduction, House Floor
- 05/21/1974, Committee Report, Committee on Commerce. Senate
- 07/10/1974, Committee Report, Committee on Interstate and Foreign Commerce. House
- 09/11/1974, Rules Committee Hearing, Committee on Rules. House
- 10/08/1974, Rules Committee Hearing, Committee on Rules. House
- 10/09/1974, Rules Committee Hearing, Committee on Rules. House
- 10/09/1974, Rules Committee Report, Committee on Rules. House
- 11/19/1974, Amendment & passage, House Floor
- 11/26/1974, Debate, resolving difference, Senate Floor
- 12/03/1974, Differences resolved, House Floor
- 12/16/1974, Bill signed by President Gerald Ford.

=== Provisions ===
The Safe Drinking Water Act was one of several pieces of environmental legislation in the 1970s. (See Nixon and the Environmental Decade (1970–1980).) The discovery of contamination from organic chemicals in public water systems and the lack of enforceable, national standards persuaded Congress to take action.

The 1974 law very clearly defined roles and responsibilities, giving the EPA the job of generating scientifically based standards that would apply to all water supplies that served 25 or more customers and creating a process for setting new standards. EPA was mandated to contract with the National Academy of Sciences (NAS) for a major study of contaminants in drinking water that might have health significance and to issue revised regulations once the NAS report was completed.

The EPA created and put into effect a thorough framework to protect public health in order to preserve safe drinking water. This involved determining which contaminants—such as lead arsenic and pathogens—posed the biggest risks to consumers and enforcing them. The agency's job was to set Maximum Contaminant Level Goals (MCLGs) based on the most recent scientific findings making sure that health protection came first regardless of cost. Furthermore, in order to balance the cost and viability of treatment technologies with public health priorities legally binding standards known as Maximum Contaminant Levels (MCLs) were developed. In order to ensure compliance, the EPA also established monitoring standards for public water systems which include recurring testing and reporting. In addition to implementing regulations, the agency started public awareness campaigns to inform local communities about water safety and possible risk mitigation strategies. As part of its ongoing work, EPA has partnered with state and local governments to upgrade water infrastructure and guarantee the long-term viability of safe drinking water supplies nationwide.

=== 1986 amendments ===
The 1986 SDWA amendments required EPA to apply future NPDWRs to both community and non-transient non-community water systems when it evaluated and revised current regulations. The first case in which this was applied was the "Phase I" final rule, published on July 8, 1987. At that time NPDWRs were promulgated for certain synthetic volatile organic compounds and applied to non-transient non-community water systems as well as community water systems. This rulemaking also clarified that non-transient non-community water systems were not subject to MCLs that were promulgated before July 8, 1987. The 1986 amendments were signed into law by President Ronald Reagan on June 19, 1986.

In addition to requiring more contaminants to be regulated, the 1986 amendments included:

- Wellhead protection
- New monitoring for certain substances
- Filtration for certain surface water systems
- Disinfection for certain groundwater systems
- Restriction on lead in solder and plumbing
- More enforcement powers.

=== 1996 SDWA amendments ===
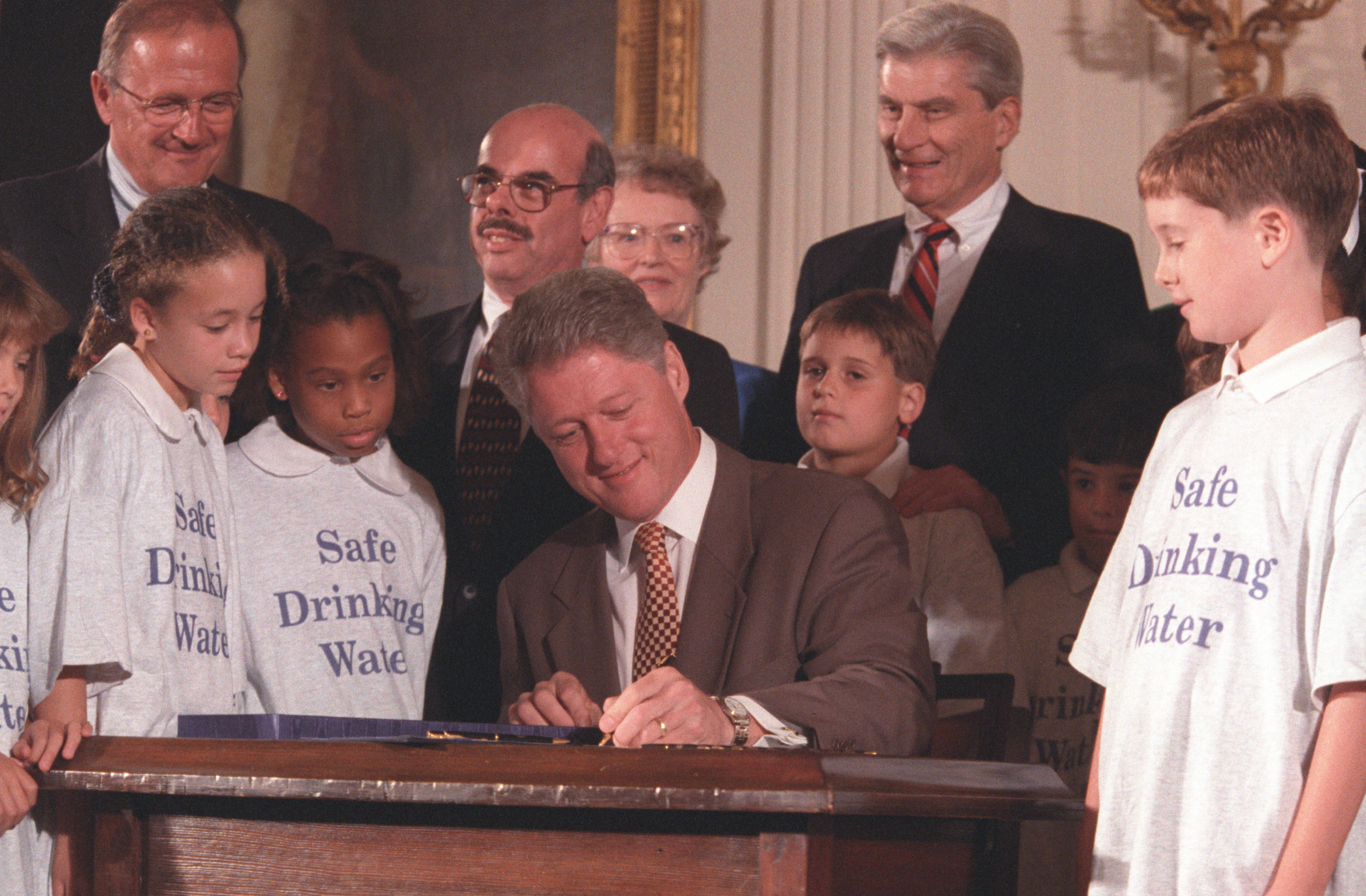
President Bill Clinton signs the Safe Drinking Water Amendments Act of 1996 in the East Room

In 1996, Congress amended the Safe Drinking Water Act to emphasize sound science and risk-based standard setting, small water supply system flexibility and technical assistance, community-empowered source water assessment and protection, public right-to-know, and water system infrastructure assistance through a multibillion-dollar state revolving loan fund. The amendments were signed into law by President Bill Clinton on August 6, 1996.

==== Main points of the 1996 amendments ====
1. Consumer Confidence Reports. All community water systems must prepare and distribute annual reports about the water they provide, including information on detected contaminants, possible health effects, and the water source(s) for the system.
2. Cost-Benefit Analysis. EPA must conduct a thorough cost-benefit analysis for every new standard to determine whether the benefits of a drinking water standard justify the costs.
3. Drinking Water State Revolving Fund. States can use this fund to help water systems make infrastructure or management improvements or to help systems assess and protect their source water.
4. Microbial Contaminants and Disinfection Byproducts. EPA is required to strengthen protection for microbial contaminants, including cryptosporidium, while strengthening control over the byproducts of chemical disinfection. EPA promulgated the Stage 1 Disinfectants and Disinfection Byproducts Rule and the Interim Enhanced Surface Water Treatment Rule to address these risks.
5. Operator Certification. Water system operators must be certified to ensure that systems are operated safely. EPA issued guidelines in 1999 specifying minimum standards for the certification and recertification of the operators of community and non-transient, noncommunity water systems. These guidelines apply to state operator certification programs. All states are currently implementing EPA-approved operator certification programs.
6. Public Information and Consultation. The SDWA emphasizes that consumers have a right to know what is in their drinking water, where it comes from, how it is treated, and how to help protect it. EPA distributes public information materials on its website and holds public meetings, working with states, tribes, local water systems, and environmental and civic groups, to encourage public involvement.
7. Small Water Systems. Small water systems are given special consideration and resources under SDWA, to make sure they have the managerial, financial, and technical ability to comply with drinking water standards.

=== 2005 amendment ===
Through the Energy Policy Act of 2005, the Safe Drinking Water Act was amended to exclude the underground injection of any fluids or propping agents other than diesel fuels used in hydraulic fracturing operations from being considered as "underground injections" for the purposes of the law.

=== 2011 amendment ===
Congress passed the Reduction of Lead in Drinking Water Act in 2011. This amendment, effective in 2014, tightened the definition of "lead-free" plumbing fixtures and fittings.

=== 2015 amendments ===
The Drinking Water Protection Act was enacted on August 7, 2015. It required EPA to submit to Congress a strategic plan for assessing and managing risks associated with algal toxins in drinking water provided by public water systems. EPA submitted the plan to Congress in November 2015.

The Grassroots Rural and Small Community Water Systems Assistance Act was signed by President Barack Obama on December 11, 2015. The amendment provides technical assistance to small public water systems, to help them comply with National Primary Drinking Water Regulations.

=== 2016 amendments ===
The Water Infrastructure Improvements for the Nation Act added several provisions to the SDWA, along with providing financial assistance to the city of Flint, Michigan in responding to its lead contamination crisis, as well as assistance for other communities. The provisions include:

- expanding the water infrastructure public-private partnership loan program
- requiring public notification when household drinking water contains lead levels above the EPA action level (currently 0.015 mg/L)
- establishing a voluntary program for testing for lead in drinking water at schools and childcare centers
- creating a public information clearinghouse on alternative drinking water delivery systems.

=== 2018 amendments ===
America's Water Infrastructure Act of 2018 included:

- Modifications to the Drinking Water State Revolving Fund
- Funding for Community Water System risk and resilience assessments.
- Funding to small and disadvantaged communities with reducing lead in drinking water systems
- Financial assistance to homeowners for lead line replacement
- Funding to test drinking water in schools and child care facilities for lead.

== Environmental justice ==
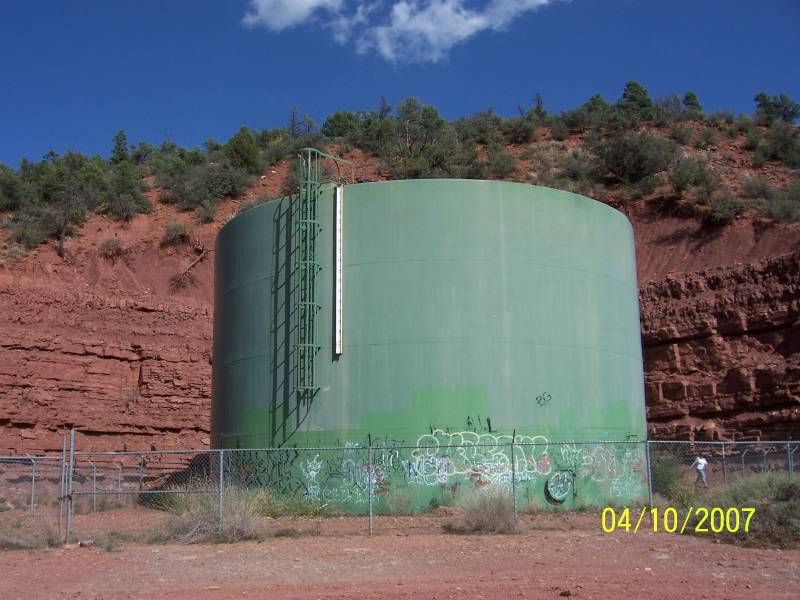
An above ground water tank on the White Mountain Apache Tribe in Arizona, the EPA worked collaboratively with the goal of improving access to safe drinking water on tribal lands.

The SDWA can promote environmental justice by increasing the safety of drinking water in the communities most adversely impacted by water contamination. Communities of color and low-income communities are disproportionately impacted by unsafe drinking water and associated health problems in the United States. Specifically, Native American reservations and communities with dense Latino and African American populations are at higher risk of exposure to drinking water contaminants. Contaminants found in the drinking water of such communities include nitrates, coliform, and lead, which have been linked to cancer, reproductive health problems, gastrointestinal illness, and other health problems. One study found that levels of contaminants in the drinking water of two Nebraska Native American reservations were significantly higher than regional contaminant levels. Another study found that Latino residents in Tucson, Arizona, had higher than average levels of contaminants in their drinking water, which were linked to higher rates of cancer and neurological disorders among residents. Also, it is understood that low-income residents in the Appalachian region of West Virginia are disproportionately exposed to contaminants in drinking water from coal mining in the region.

In addressing the updated priorities associated with the act, EPA states that its first priority is to "promote equity... in disadvantaged, small, and environmental justice communities," specifically addressing that disadvantaged communities face disproportionate risks associated with exposure to contaminated drinking water.

== See also ==
- Clean Water Act - pollution control law for surface waters
- Drinking water quality in the United States
- Water purification - technical description of treatment processes
- Water supply and sanitation in the United States
