= Wellhead protection area =

A wellhead protection area is a surface and subsurface land area regulated to prevent contamination of a well or well-field supplying a public water system. This program, established under the Safe Drinking Water Act (42 U.S.C. 330f-300j), is implemented through state governments.

== History ==
In 1986, the Environmental Protection Agency (EPA) amended the Safe Drinking Water Act to include the Wellhead Protection Program. This was first enforced in 1990 in New England.

== Usage ==
Plans for protection of groundwater are developed by state governments according to location of wells, and potential threats from contaminants. The area designated can be determined by the well's ability to pump water as well as the quality of the source aquifer. While states are allowed to create their own programs, they must be submitted to and approved by the EPA before going into effect. The EPA requires state's proposals to include plans of action in case of contamination, regular testing of the source water, and management. They also are required to document data such as flow rate and direction, and groundwater levels.

=== Issues ===
Wellhead protection areas are important to designate because they can caution planners when building in those areas and keep control of potential drinking water contaminants. Planners will conduct research of what contaminants are most prominent and where they come from. These typically have a source of industrial or agricultural human activities. As part of the protection plan, states will have a backup source for drinking water in case of emergency such as well destruction or contamination.

The program is not funded federally, which can cause issues for some states.
