= Pavel Djidjov =

Bulgarian theologian

Pavel Djidjov (19 July 1919 – 3 October 1952) was a Bulgarian theologian who was executed after a show trial and beatified by Pope John Paul II in 2002. He is commemorated on November 11.

== Education, career ==
Pavel Djidjov was born to a Latin rite Catholic family in Plovdiv. He was baptized on 2 August 1919 and given the name Joseph. He took the name Pavel (Paul) when he entered the Assumptionist novitiate in Nozeroy, France, in October 1938.

To achieve his childhood ambition of attaining priesthood, he entered the Assumptionist-sponsored St. Augustine College in Plovdiv, where he was considered a good student, especially in mathematics. After his novitiate, he went on to study theology in Lormoy, France, near Paris, during World War II. For health reasons he returned to Bulgaria in 1942 to complete his theological studies and was ordained on 26 January 1945. He later continued his studies in economics and social sciences. His first assignment was as a teacher at the Assumptionist high school in Varna, where he was closely watched by the secret police. Not long thereafter he was named to be the treasurer at St. Augustine College in Plovdiv and served there until the institution was closed by the Communists in 1948.

He was particularly appreciated by students and others for his piety, sense of humor, deep faith, ecumenical spirit, and bravery before the Communist regime. Often he risked personal safety by defending the rights of the Church in public and visiting political prisoners.

== Arrest and trial ==
As a Soviet satellite, Bulgaria suffered from the wave of anti-Church legislation that swept the bloc in the years after World War II (e.g. the arrest of Archbishop Aloysius Stepinac in Yugoslavia in 1946, of Cardinal József Mindszenty in Hungary in 1948, of Archbishop Josef Beran in Czechoslovakia in 1950, and of Cardinal Stefan Wyszyński in Poland in 1953). Already as a student in 1945, Djidjov had engaged in polemics with Communist students and professors and was placed on a blacklist.

A month before his arrest in July 1952, he wrote to the Assumptionist procurator in Rome, Fr. Rémi Kokel, concerning a colleague they hadn't heard from in a long time: "We are distressed, having heard nothing of Fr. Josaphat (Chichkov) for six months now. There will be three trials within a week against Catholic priests. The first one is already over: death penalty for a diocesan priest of the Latin rite. Tomorrow it will be the trial of a diocesan priest of the Slavonic rite, in Sofia; the day after tomorrow, that of a Capuchin. And these will not be the last ones, surely. May God’s will be done." One month later he, too, was imprisoned.

Besides Djidjov, two other Assumptionist brothers were imprisoned: Fr. Joseph Chichkov and Fr. Kamen Vitchev. The latter followed the Byzantine Rite, whereas the others followed the Latin Rite—in their martyrdom, they united the two main Catholic rites, a point reiterated by Pope John Paul II in 2002. All three had been schooled in Belgium and France, and were accused of spying for the French government. After what international organizations universally considered a show trial, which began on 29 September 1952, and ended with a guilty verdict and a death sentence on 3 October, the three, together with the Passionist bishop Eugene Bossilkov, were executed by firing squad in the Sofia prison, at 11:30 PM, on 11 November 1952. Their bodies were buried in a communal grave and have not been recovered.

Fr. Pavel Djidjov was declared a martyr for the faith and beatified by Pope John Paul II in Plovdiv on 26 May 2002. The pope delivered a homily on the occasion, during his 2002 visit to Bulgaria. Later, he commented that the Eucharistic celebration during which he beatified Djidjov, Vitchev, and Chichkov was "the high point of my brief but intense visit in Bulgaria."

On 28 July 2010 the Bulgarian parliament passed a law officially rehabilitating all of those who had been condemned by the People's Republic of Bulgaria in 1952, including Fr. Djidjov.

== Sources ==
- Guissard, Lucien. The Assumptionists: From Past to Present, Bayard Publications, 2002 (ISBN 1-58595-207-9).
- Gallay, Pierre (2002). The Martyrdom of the Three Bulgarian Assumptionists. Bayard Presse.. Translated in Dutch as Gallay, Pierre; Louis Augustijns (2002). Het Marterlaarschap van Drie Bulgaarse Assumptionisten. Bayard Presse.
- Royal, Robert (2000). The Catholic Martyrs of the Twentieth Century: A Comprehensive World History. New York: Crossroad. ISBN 0-8245-1846-2.
- Holzer, Bernard; Jean-Baptiste Michel (2003). Les rideaux rouges de Sofia: Trois simples prêtres, martyrs fusillés, bienheureux. Bayard Presse. ISBN 978-2-227-47221-1.
- "Apostolic Visit of His Holiness Pope John Paul II to Azerbaijan and Bulgaria. Eucharistic Celebration - Beatifications. Homily of the Holy Father". Holy See. 2002-05-26.
