= Water supply and sanitation in the United States =

Water supply and sanitation in United States
Data
- Access to an at least basic water source: 99.88% (2020)
- Access to at least basic sanitation: 99.68% (2020)
- Average urban water use (L/person/day): 330 litres (87 US gal) in 2010
- Share of household metering: 95% of residential water customers (1995)
- Annual investment in WSS: $28.5 bn or $97/capita (2005)
- Share of self-financing by utilities: 39% (water only)
- Share of tax-financing: 5% by government grants, 13% by government loans (water only, 2000)

Institutions
- Responsibility for policy setting: State and federal
- No. of urban service providers: 4,000
- No. of rural service providers: 50,000
- Service providers: Local

Water supply and sanitation in the United States involves a number of issues including water scarcity, pollution, a backlog of investment, concerns about the affordability of water for the poorest, and a rapidly retiring workforce. Increased variability and intensity of rainfall as a result of climate change is expected to produce both more severe droughts and flooding, with potentially serious consequences for water supply and for pollution from combined sewer overflows. Droughts are likely to particularly affect the 66 percent of Americans whose communities depend on surface water. As for drinking water quality, there are concerns about disinfection by-products, lead, perchlorates, PFAS and pharmaceutical substances, but generally drinking water quality in the U.S. is good.

Cities, utilities, state governments and the federal government have addressed the above issues in various ways. To keep pace with demand from an increasing population, utilities traditionally have augmented supplies. However, faced with increasing costs and droughts, water conservation is beginning to receive more attention and is being supported through the federal WaterSense program. The reuse of treated wastewater for non-potable uses is also becoming increasingly common. Pollution through wastewater discharges, a major issue in the 1960s, has been brought largely under control.

Most Americans are served by publicly owned water and sewer utilities. Public water systems, which serve more than 25 customers or 15 service connections, are regulated by the U.S. Environmental Protection Agency (EPA) and state agencies under the Safe Drinking Water Act (SDWA). Eleven percent of Americans receive water from private (so-called "investor-owned") utilities. In rural areas, cooperatives often provide drinking water. Finally, over 13 million households are served by their own wells. The accessibility of water not only depends on geographical location, but on the communities that belong to those regions. Of the millions who lack access to clean water, the majority are low-income minority individuals. Wastewater systems are also regulated by EPA and state governments under the Clean Water Act (CWA). Public utilities commissions or public service commissions regulate tariffs charged by private utilities. In some states they also regulate tariffs by public utilities. EPA also provides funding to utilities through state revolving funds.

Water consumption in the United States is more than double that in Central Europe, with large variations among the states. In 2002 the average American family spent $474 on water and sewerage charges, which is about the same level as in Europe. The median household spent about 1.1 percent of its income on water and sewage. By 2018, 87% of the American population receives water from publicly owned water companies.

== History ==
In the 19th century numerous American cities were afflicted with major outbreaks of disease, including cholera in 1832, 1849 and 1866 and typhoid in 1848. The fast-growing cities did not have sewers and relied on contaminated wells within the city confines for drinking water supply. In the mid-19th century many cities built centralized water supply systems. However, initially these systems provided raw river water without any treatment. Only after John Snow established the link between contaminated water and disease in 1854 and after authorities became gradually convinced of that link, water treatment plants were added and public health improved. Sewers were built since the 1850s, initially based on the erroneous belief that bad air (miasma theory) caused cholera and typhoid. It took until the 1890s for the now universally accepted germ theory of disease to prevail.

However, most wastewater was still discharged without any treatment, because wastewater was not believed to be harmful to receiving waters due to the natural dilution and self-purifying capacity of rivers, lakes and the sea. Wastewater treatment only became widespread after the introduction of federal funding in 1948 and especially after an increase in environmental consciousness and the upscaling of financing in the 1970s. From 1948 to 1987 federal funding for sanitation was provided through grants to local governments. Congress amended the CWA in 1987 and changed the funding system for sewage treatment to loans through revolving funds. Congress added a state revolving fund for drinking water utilities to the SDWA in 1996.

=== Piped water supply until 1948 ===
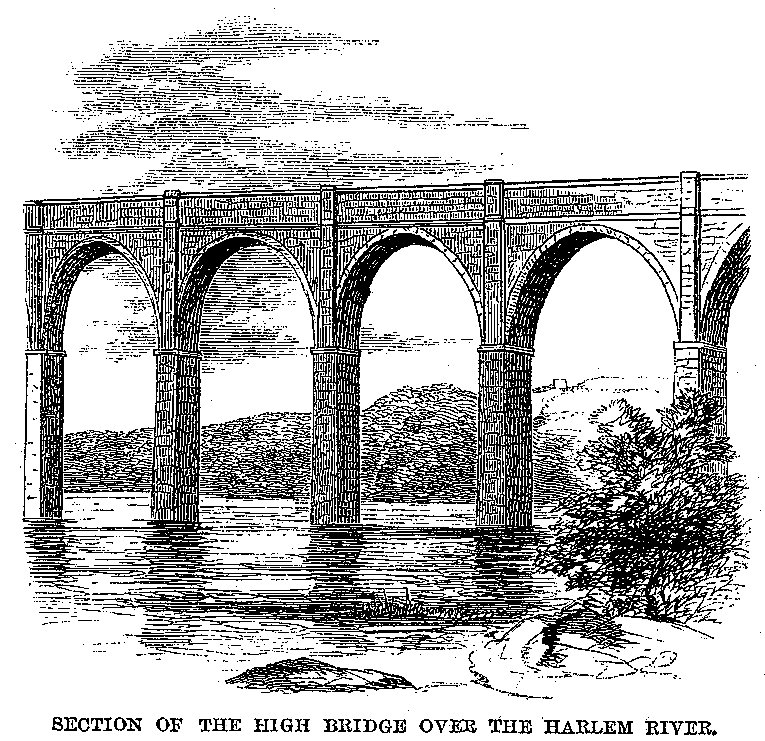
Croton Aqueduct, New York

In the 1840s and 1850s the largest cities in the U.S. built pipelines to supply drinking water from rivers or lakes. However, the drinking water was initially not treated, since the link between waterborne pathogens and diseases was not yet well known. In 1842 New York City was one of the first cities in the U.S. to tap water resources outside the city limits. It dammed the Croton River in Westchester County, New York, and built an aqueduct from the reservoir to the city. Also in 1842, construction was completed on Chicago's first water works, with water mains made of cedar and a water intake located about 150 feet (46 m) into Lake Michigan. In 1848, Boston began construction of a water transmission system. A tributary of the Sudbury River was impounded creating Lake Cochituate, from where the Cochituate Aqueduct transported water to the Brookline Reservoir that fed the city's distribution system. In 1853, Washington, D.C., followed suit by beginning the construction of the Washington Aqueduct to provide water from the Great Falls on the Potomac River.

In 1854, the British physician John Snow found that cholera was spread through contaminated water. As a result of his findings, several cities began to treat all water with sand filters and chlorine before distributing it to the public. Before efforts to clean drinking water were implemented at the turn of the 20th century, mortality among 1- to 5-year-olds in the United States in some major river cities was nearly one in five. Clean water is estimated to have reduced about three-fourths of infant mortality, and two-thirds of child mortality. By 1900, sand filtration was widely used. In 1908, the first continuous application of chlorination to drinking U.S. water was in Jersey City, New Jersey (and not without controversy). Cities also began to construct sewers in the late 19th century. As a result of water treatment and sanitation, the incidence of cholera and typhoid rapidly decreased. Slow sand filtration was initially the technology of choice for water treatment, later being gradually displaced by rapid sand filtration. As a result of the water purification efforts, mortality among black infants declined in particular, leading to a 13 percent reduction in the black-white infant mortality gap.

In the arid American Southwest, the water demand of rapidly growing cities such as Los Angeles exceeded local water availability, requiring the construction of large pipelines to bring in water from far-away sources. The most spectacular example is the first Los Angeles Aqueduct built between 1905 and 1913 to supply water from the Owens Valley over a distance of 233 mi (375 km).

Drinking water quality standards were first issued in 1914 by the United States Public Health Service. However they were only enforceable for interstate transportation carriers (such as railroads) at specific points where water was transferred.

=== Sanitation until 1948 ===
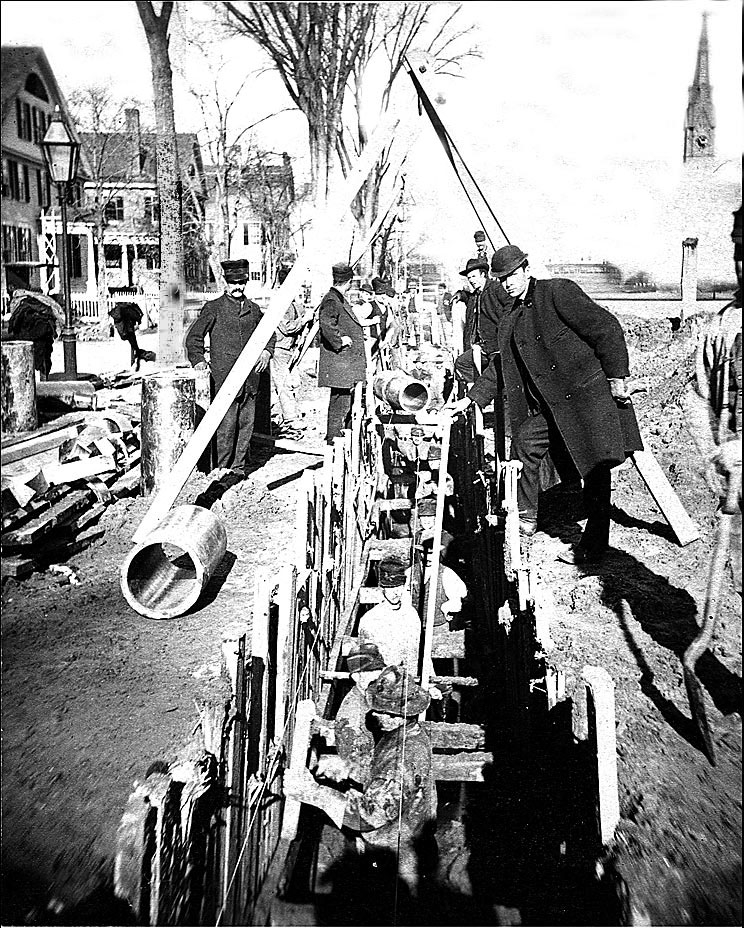
Sewer construction in Keene, New Hampshire in 1882

Most of the first sewer systems in the United States were built as combined sewers (carrying both storm water and sewerage). They discharged into rivers, lakes and the sea without any treatment. The main reason for choosing combined sewers over separate systems (separating sanitary sewers from storm water drains) was a belief that combined sewer systems were cheaper to build than separate systems. Also, there was no European precedent for successful separate sewer systems at the time. The first large-scale sewer systems in the United States were constructed in Chicago and Brooklyn in the late 1850s, followed by other major U.S. cities.

Few sewage treatment facilities were constructed in the late 19th century to treat combined wastewater because of the associated difficulties. There were only 27 U.S. cities with wastewater treatment works by 1892, most of them "treating" wastewater through land application. Of these 27 cities, 26 had separate sanitary and storm water sewer systems, thus facilitating wastewater treatment, because there was no need for large capacities to accommodate wet weather flows. Furthermore, there was a belief that the diluted combined wastewater was not harmful to receiving waters, due to the natural dilution and self-purifying capacity of rivers, lakes and the sea. In the early 20th century a debate evolved between those who thought it was in the best interest of public health to construct wastewater treatment facilities and those who believed building them was unnecessary. Nevertheless, many cities began to opt for separate sewer systems, creating favorable conditions for adding wastewater treatment plants in the future.

Where wastewater was being treated it was typically discharged into rivers or lakes. However, in 1932, the first reclaimed water facility in the U.S. was built in Golden Gate Park, San Francisco, for the reuse of treated wastewater in landscape irrigation.

Sanitary sewers were not the only sanitation solution applied. They were particularly useful in high-density urban areas. However, in some newly built lower-density areas, decentralized septic systems were built. They were attractive because they reduced capital expenditures and had fewer operation and maintenance costs compared to wastewater treatment plants.

=== After 1948: Federal government ===
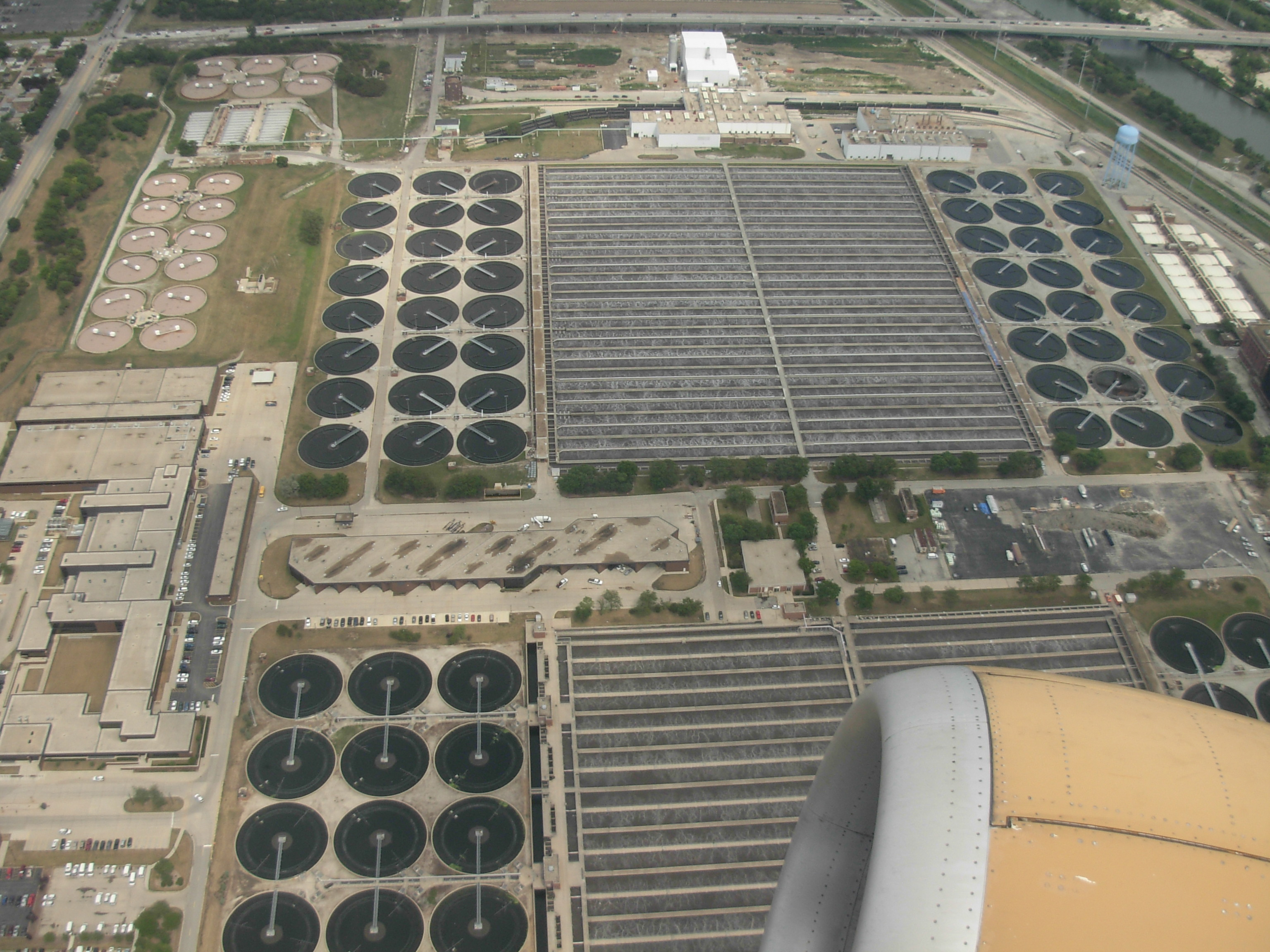
Stickney Water Reclamation Plant, serving metropolitan Chicago

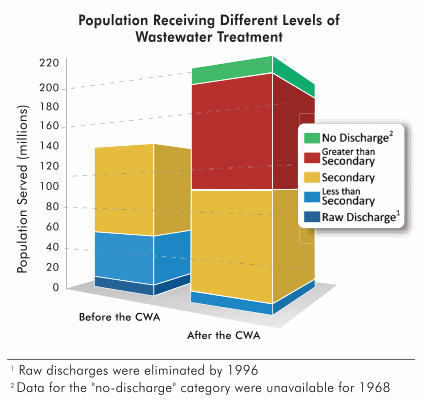
The CWA construction grants program funded new sewage treatment plants and upgrading of existing plants to national secondary treatment standards.

In the first half of the 20th century water supply and sanitation were a local government responsibility with regulation at the state level; the federal government played almost no role in the sector at that time. This changed with the enactment of the Federal Water Pollution Control Act of 1948, which provided for comprehensive planning, technical services, research, and financial assistance by the federal government to state and local governments for sanitary infrastructure. The Act was amended in 1965, establishing a uniform set of water quality standards and creating a Federal Water Pollution Control Administration authorized to set standards where states failed to do so.

Comprehensive federal regulations for water supply and sanitation were introduced in the 1970s, in reaction to increased public awareness of environmental degradation nationwide. In 1970 EPA was established by the Richard Nixon administration, and authority for managing various environmental programs was transferred to the new agency. In 1972, Congress passed the Clean Water Act (CWA), requiring industrial plants and municipal sewage plants to improve their waste treatment practices in order to limit the effect of contaminants on freshwater sources. In 1974, the Safe Drinking Water Act was adopted for the regulation of public water systems. It was motivated by a resurgence in concern about the safety of drinking water due to breakthroughs in chemistry that revealed organic chemicals in water that were tentatively linked with cancer. This law specified a number of contaminants that must be closely monitored and reported to residents should they exceed the maximum contaminant levels (MCLs) allowed. EPA was charged with creating standards for drinking water for all public systems, defined as those that served more than 25 customers or 15 service connections. The new law required federal and state governments to closely monitor local drinking water utilities for safety and compliance with federal standards. The CWA set the unprecedented goal of eliminating all water pollution by 1985 and authorized massive expenditures of $24.6 billion in research and construction grants for municipal sewage treatment. The funds initially provided an incentive to build centralized wastewater collection and treatment infrastructure for municipalities, instead of decentralized systems. However, the 1977 amendments to the CWA required communities to consider alternatives to the conventional centralized sewer systems, and financial assistance was made available for such alternatives. In the mid-1990s decentralized systems served approximately 25 percent of the U.S. population, and approximately 37 percent of new housing developments.

The vast majority of municipal wastewater in the U.S. is treated to the national secondary treatment standard or better. There have been a few disagreements between EPA and some local governments about the appropriate level of treatment, with the former arguing for more stringent standards. For example, in the late 1980s, the city of San Diego and EPA were involved in a legal dispute over the requirement to treat sewage at the Point Loma Wastewater Treatment Plant to secondary treatment standards. The city prevailed, saying that it saved ratepayers an estimated $3 billion and that process had proved successful in maintaining a healthy ocean environment. The Point Loma plant uses an advanced primary process. The requirement to perform secondary treatment on wastewater before ocean discharge was waived by the EPA in 1995, "taking into account the city's unique circumstances".

In 1987 Congress passed the Water Quality Act, which replaced the construction grant program with a system of subsidized loans using the Clean Water State Revolving Fund (CWSRF). The intention at the time was to completely phase out federal funding after a few years. Funding peaked in 1991 and continued at high levels thereafter, despite the original intentions. New challenges arose, such as the need to address combined sewer overflows for which EPA issued a policy in 1994. In 1996 Congress established the Drinking Water State Revolving Fund, building on the success of the CWSRF, in order to finance investments to improve compliance with more stringent drinking water quality standards.

According to a 2025 study, the cost of water for American households has risen by 62 percent compared to a decade ago—a trend that does not align with household income growth or inflation rates. Between 2015 and 2025, water prices rose by 62 percent, whereas food inflation stood at 30 percent and household income increased by 19 percent during the same period.

== Technical and environmental overview ==
This section provides a brief overview of the water supply and sanitation infrastructure in the U.S., water sources of some of the main cities, and the main types of residential water use.

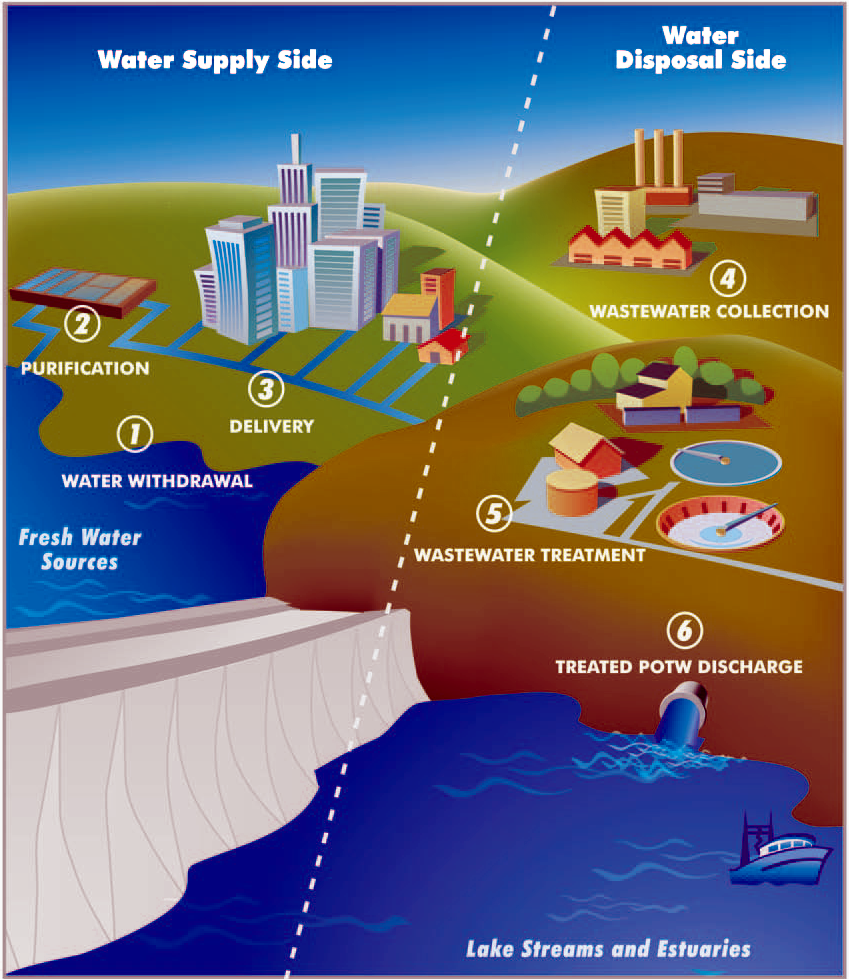
Typical urban water cycle

=== Infrastructure ===
The centralized drinking water supply infrastructure in the United States consists of dams and reservoirs, well fields, pumping stations, aqueducts for the transport of large quantities of water over long distances, water treatment plants, reservoirs in the water distribution system (including water towers), and 1.8 million miles of distribution lines. Depending on the location and quality of the water source, all or some of these elements may be present in a particular water supply system. In addition to this infrastructure for centralized network distribution, over 13 million households rely on their own water sources, usually wells.

The centralized sanitation infrastructure in the U.S. consists of 1.2 million miles of sewers—including both sanitary sewers and combined sewers, sewage pumping stations and publicly owned treatment works (POTW). EPA estimated that there were at least 16,583 POTWs operating in 2004, serving a population of 222.8 million. About 860 communities in the U.S. have combined sewer systems, serving about 40 million people. In addition, at least 17% of Americans are served by on-site sanitation systems such as septic tanks.

In the United States over 75 percent of the population is served by over 16,000 municipal sewage treatment plants. Most plants are required to meet national secondary treatment standards.

=== Water sources ===
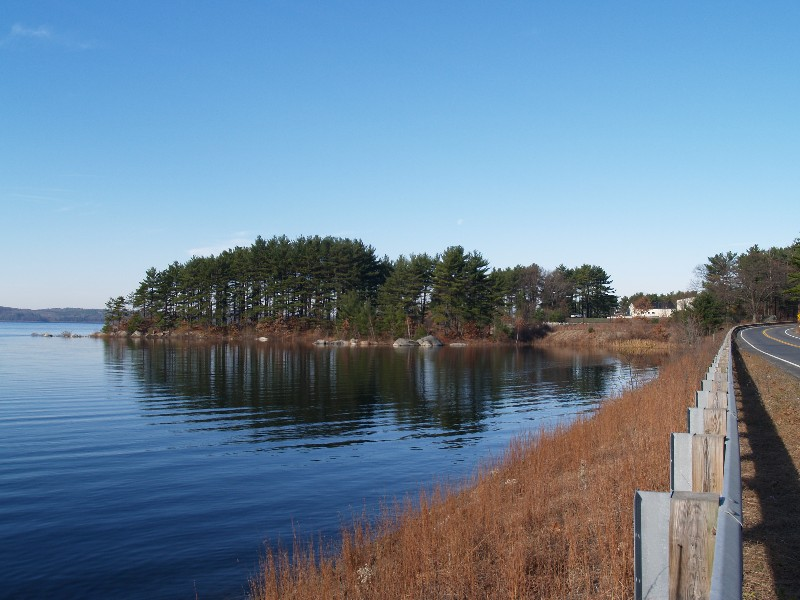
The Wachusett Reservoir is a source of drinking water supply for Boston

About 66% of the U.S. population (195 million people) are served by surface water systems, and 34% (101 million) are served by groundwater-supplied systems (as of 2009). Most groundwater systems are in small communities, and comprise 90% of the overall population of public water systems.

For a surface water system to operate without filtration it has to fulfill certain criteria set by the EPA under its 2006 Surface Water Treatment Rule, including the implementation of a watershed control program. The water system of New York City has repeatedly fulfilled these criteria for most of the water processed through its facilities.

==== Cities supplied primarily by surface water without filtration ====
Boston, New York City, San Francisco, Denver, and Portland are among the large cities in the U.S. that do not need to treat most of their surface water sources beyond disinfection, because their water sources are located in the upper reaches of protected watersheds and thus are naturally very pure.

Boston receives most of its water from the Quabbin and Wachusett Reservoirs and the Ware River in central and western Massachusetts.

New York City's water supply is fed by three watershed systems. The two larger systems, Catskill and Delaware, do not have filtration. The Catskill watershed is in one of the largest protected wilderness areas in the United States. Water from the two systems has been treated with ultraviolet germicidal irradiation since 2013. The Croton system, which supplies 10% of the city's water, has been filtered since 2015.

San Francisco obtains 85% of its drinking water from high Sierra snowmelt through the Hetch Hetchy Reservoir in Yosemite National Park. However, to supplement the imported water supply, and to help maintain delivery of drinking water in the event of a major earthquake, drought or decline in the snowpack, San Francisco considers the use of alternative locally produced, sustainable water sources such as reclaimed water for irrigation, local groundwater and desalination during drought periods, all as part of its Water Supply Diversification Program.

The largest source of water supply for Portland is the Bull Run Watershed.

Denver receives its water almost entirely from mountain snowmelt in a number of highly protected watersheds in more than 9 counties. Its water is stored in 14 reservoirs, the largest of which is the Dillon Reservoir on the Blue River in the Colorado River. Water is diverted from there through the Harold D. Roberts Tunnel under the Continental Divide into the South Platte River Basin.

==== Cities supplied primarily by surface water with water treatment ====
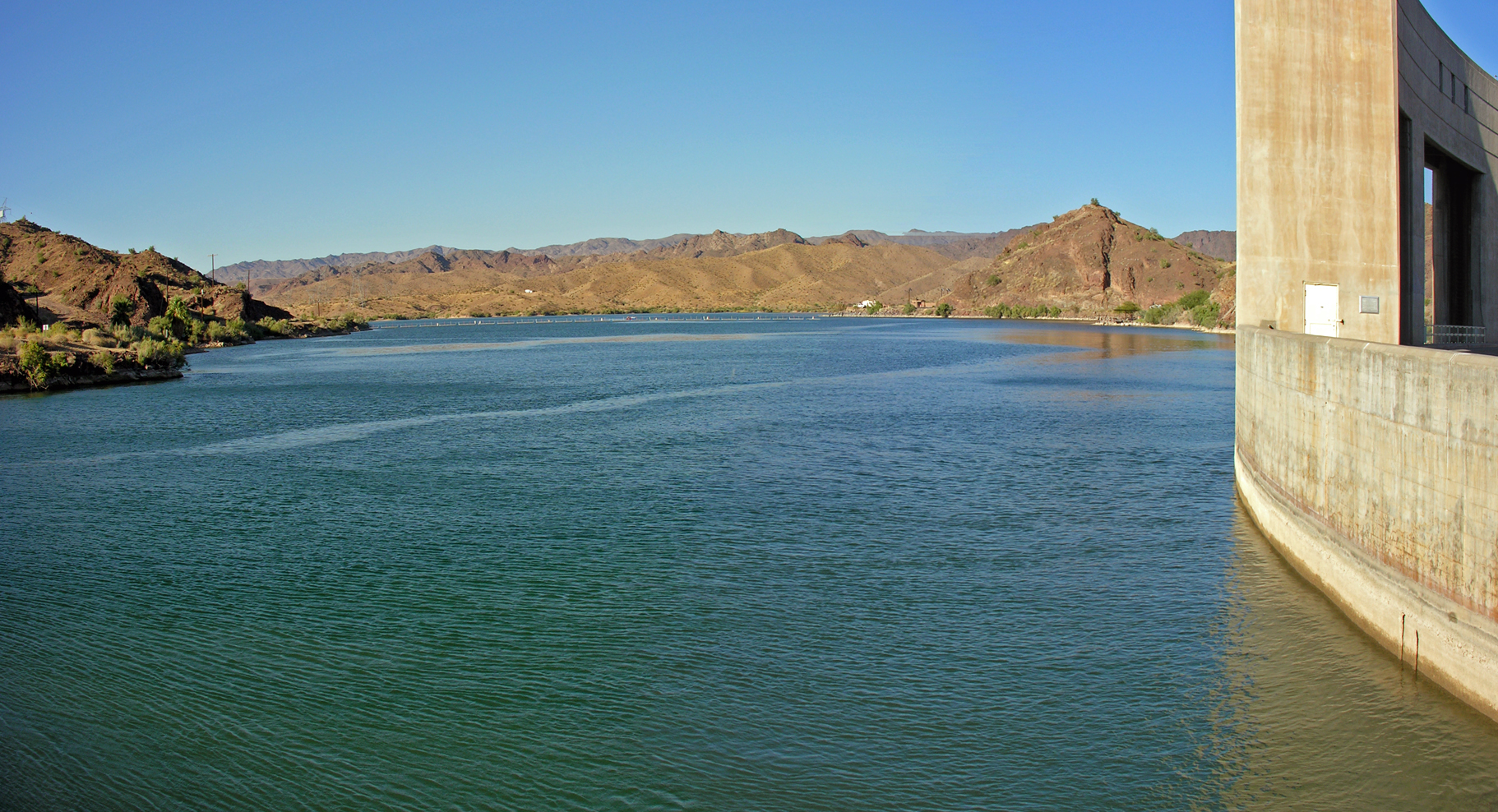
Lake Havasu on the Colorado River is the secondary source of drinking water for Phoenix, Arizona, supplying about 40% of Phoenix's water supply. 50% comes from the watersheds of the Verde and Salt Rivers, according to the official website of the City of Phoenix Water Services Department. Los Angeles also obtains a significant percentage of its water supply from Lake Havasu.

Cities that rely on more or less polluted surface water from the lower reaches of rivers have to rely on extensive and costly water purification plants. The Las Vegas Valley obtains 90% of its water from Lake Mead on the Colorado River, which has been affected by drought. To supply a portion of the future water supply, Las Vegas plans to buy water rights in the Snake Valley in White Pine County, 250 mi (400 km) north of the city straddling the Utah border and other areas, pumping it to Las Vegas through a US$2 billion pipeline. Phoenix draws about half of its drinking water from the Salt River–Verde River watershed, and about 40% from the Colorado River further downstream at Lake Havasu through the Central Arizona Project. Los Angeles obtains about half of its drinking water from the Owens River and Mono Lake through the Los Angeles Aqueduct, with additional supplies from Lake Havasu through the Colorado River Aqueduct. San Diego imports nearly 90 percent of its water from other areas, specifically northern California and the Colorado River.

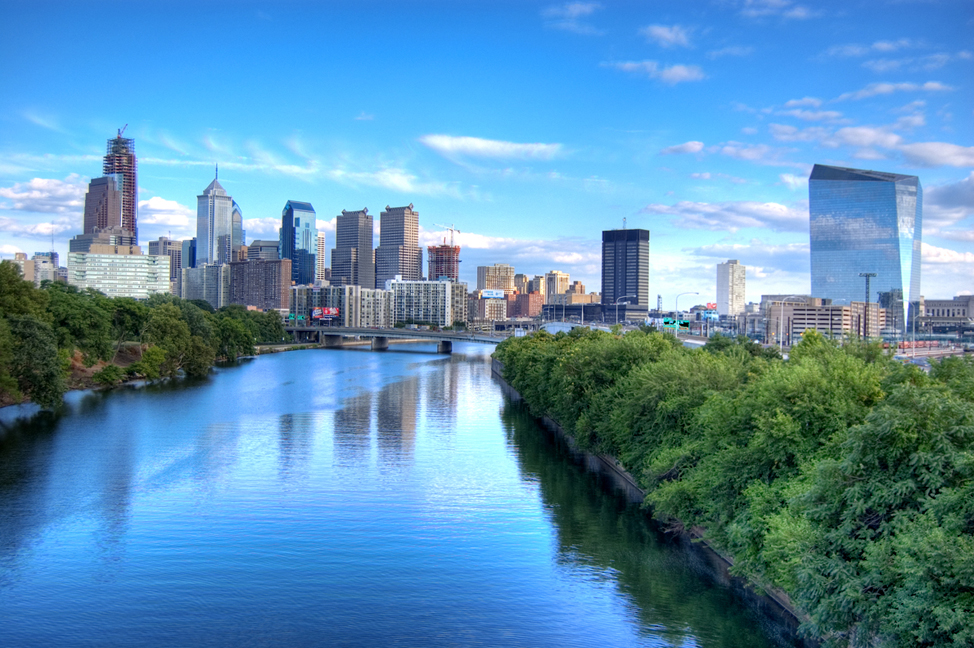
The Schuylkill River provides 40% of the water used in Philadelphia

The cities on the Mississippi River are supplied by water from that river except for Memphis. The metropolitan area of Atlanta receives 70% of its water from the Chattahoochee River and another 28% from the Etowah, Flint, Ocmulgee and Oconee rivers. Chicago is supplied by water from Lake Michigan and Detroit receives its water from the Detroit River. Philadelphia receives 60% of its water from the Delaware River and 40% from the Schuylkill River. Washington, D.C. receives its water from the Potomac River through the Washington Aqueduct.

==== Cities supplied primarily by groundwater ====
Miami and its metropolitan area obtain drinking water primarily from the Biscayne Aquifer. Given increasing water demand, Miami-Dade County is considering the use of reclaimed water to help preserve the Biscayne Aquifer. Memphis receives its water from artesian aquifers. San Antonio draws the bulk of its water from the Edwards Aquifer; it did not use any surface water until 2006.

==== Cities supplied by a mix of groundwater and surface water ====
Seventy-one percent of Houston's supply flows from the Trinity River into Lake Livingston, and from the San Jacinto River into Lake Conroe and Lake Houston. Deep underground wells drilled into the Evangeline and Chicot aquifers provide the other 29 percent of the city's water supply.

==== Rainwater harvesting ====
In the United States, until 2009 in Colorado, water rights laws almost completely restricted rainwater harvesting; a property owner who captured rainwater was deemed to be stealing it from those who have the rights to take water from the watershed. Now, residential good owners who meet certain criteria may obtain a permit to install a rooftop precipitation collection system (SB 09-080). Up to 10 large scale pilot studies may also be permitted (HB 09–1129). The main factor in persuading the Colorado Legislature to change the law was a 2007 study that found that in an average year, 97% of the precipitation that fell in Douglas County, in the southern suburbs of Denver, never reached a stream—it was used by plants or evaporated on the ground. Rainwater catchment is mandatory for new dwellings in Santa Fe, New Mexico. Texas offers a sales tax exemption on the purchase of rainwater harvesting equipment. Both Texas and Ohio allow the practice even for potable purposes. Oklahoma passed the Water for 2060 Act in 2012, to promote pilot projects for rainwater and graywater use among other water-saving techniques.

=== Water use ===
Domestic water use (also called home or residential water use) in the United States was estimated by the United States Geological Survey at 29.4 billion US gallons (111,000,000 m^{3}) per day in 2005, and 27.4 billion US gallons (104,000,000 m^{3}) per day in 2010 (7 percent lower). The bulk of domestic water is provided through public networks. 13% or 3.6 billion US gallons (14,000,000 m^{3}) of water is self-supplied. The average domestic water use per person in the U.S. was 98-US-gallon (370 L) per day in 2005, and 88-US-gallon (330 L) per day in 2010. This is about 2.2 times as high as in England (150 L) and 2.6 times as high as in Germany (126 L).

One of the reasons for the high domestic water use in the U.S. is the high share of outdoor water use. For example, the arid West has some of the highest per capita domestic water use, largely because of landscape irrigation. Per capita domestic water use varied from 51-US-gallon (190 L) per day in Maine to 148-US-gallon (560 L) per day in Arizona and 167-US-gallon (630 L) per day in Utah. According to a 1999 study, on average all over the U.S. 58% of domestic water use is outdoors for gardening, swimming pools etc. and 42% is used indoors. A 2016 update of the 1999 study measured the average quantities and percent shares of seven indoor end uses of water:

- 24% toilets
- 3% baths
- 20% showers
- 17% Clothes washers
- 1% Dishwashers
- 19% Faucets
- 4% Other domestic uses.

Only a very small share of public water supply is used for drinking. According to one 2002 survey of 1,000 households, an estimated 56% of Americans drank water straight from the tap and an additional 37% drank tap water after filtering it. 74% of Americans said they bought bottled water. According to a non-representative survey conducted among 216 parents (173 Latinos and 43 non-Latinos), 63 (29%) never drank tap water. The share is much higher among Latinos (34%) than among non-Latinos (12%). The study concluded that many Latino families avoid drinking tap water because they fear it causes illness, resulting in greater cost for the purchase of bottled and filtered water. This notion is also repeated among Asians.

== Institutional overview ==
=== Service providers ===
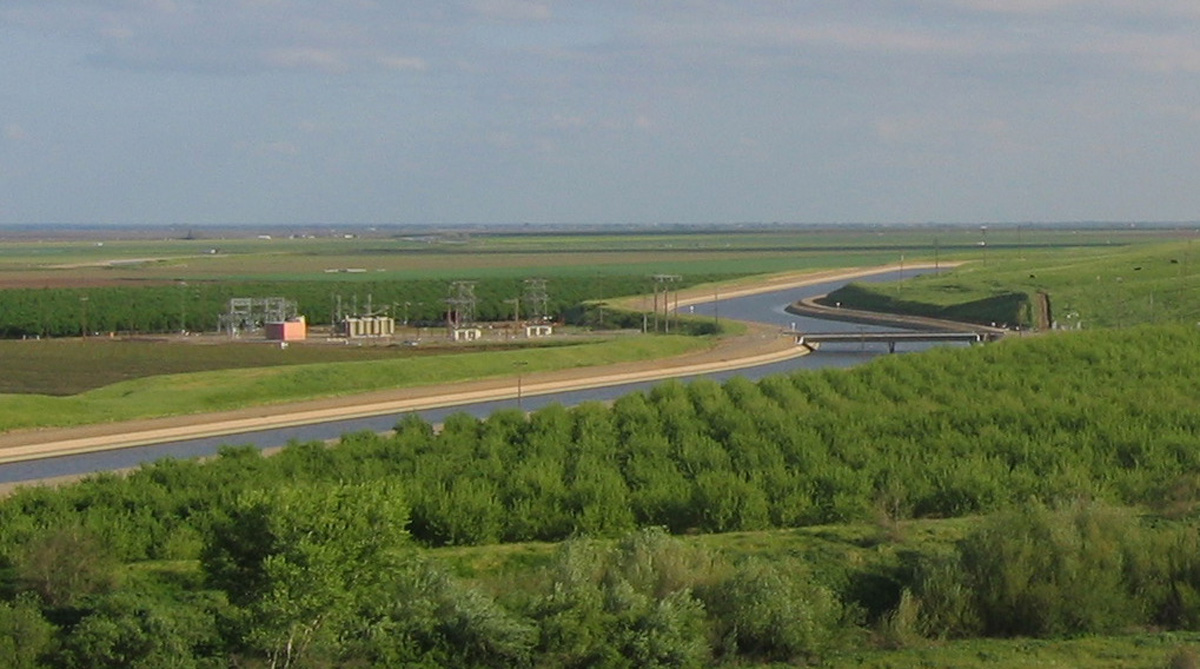
The California Aqueduct brings water from Northern to Southern California

EPA defines a public water system (PWS) as one that provides water for human consumption through pipes or other constructed conveyances to at least 15 service connections or serves an average of at least 25 people for at least 60 days a year. The agency has defined three types of PWS:

1. Community Water System (CWS): a PWS that supplies water to the same population year-round.
2. Non-Transient Non-Community Water System (NTNCWS): a PWS that regularly supplies water to at least 25 of the same people at least six months per year, but not year-round. Some examples are schools, factories, office buildings, and hospitals which have their own water systems.
3. Transient Non-Community Water System (TNCWS): a PWS that provides water in a place such as a gas station or campground where people do not remain for long periods of time.

In 2007, there were about 155,000 PWSs in the United States, of which 52,000 CWSs. PWSs are either publicly owned, cooperatives or privately owned, serving a total of about 242 million people in 2000. EPA estimates the number of beneficiaries of community water systems at 288 million in 2007 The United States Geological Survey estimates that "About 242 million people depended on water from public suppliers" in 2000. Four thousand systems provide water in localities with more than 10,000 inhabitants, and the remaining 50,000 systems provide water in localities with less than 10,000 inhabitants. In 2000, 15% of Americans (43.5 million people) relied on their own water source, usually a well, for drinking water.

Utilities in charge of public water supply and sanitation systems can be owned, financed, operated and maintained by a public entity, a private company or both can share responsibilities through a public-private partnership. Utilities can either be in charge of only water supply and/or sanitation, or they can also be in charge of providing other services, in particular electricity and gas. In the latter case they are called multi-utilities. Bulk water suppliers are entities that manage large aqueducts and sell either treated or untreated water to various users, including utilities.

Public service providers. Eighty-nine percent of Americans served by a public water system are served by a public or cooperative entity. Usually public systems are managed by utilities that are owned by a city or county, but have a separate legal personality, management and finances. Examples are the District of Columbia Water and Sewer Authority, the Los Angeles Department of Water and Power and Denver Water. In some cases public utilities span several jurisdictions. An example is the Washington Suburban Sanitary Commission that spans two counties in Maryland. Utility cooperatives are a major provider of water services, especially in small towns and rural areas

Private utilities. About half of American drinking water utilities, or about 26,700, are privately owned, providing water to 11% of Americans served by public water systems. Most of the private utilities are small, but a few are large and are traded on the stock exchange. The largest private water company in the U.S. is American Water, which serves 15 million customers in 1,600 communities in the U.S. and Canada. It is followed by United Water, which serves 7 million customers and is owned by the French firm Suez Environnement. Overall, about 33.5 million Americans (11% of the population) get water from a privately owned drinking water utility. In addition, 20% of all wastewater utilities in the U.S. are privately owned, many of them relatively small. About 3% of Americans get wastewater service from private wastewater utilities. In addition, more than 1,300 government entities (typically municipalities) contract with private companies to provide water and/or wastewater services.

Multi-utilities. Some utilities in the U.S. provide only water and/or sewer services, while others are multi-utilities that also provide power and gas services. Examples of utilities that provide only water and sewer services are the Boston Water and Sewer Commission, Dallas Water Utilities, the New York City Department of Environmental Protection, Seattle Public Utilities and the Washington Suburban Sanitary Commission. Other utilities, such as the San Francisco Public Utilities Commission, provide power in addition to water and sewer services. Other multi-utilities provide power and water services, but no sewer services, such as the Los Angeles Department of Water and Power and the Orlando Utilities Commission. There are also some utilities that provide only sewer services, such as the Metropolitan Water Reclamation District of Greater Chicago or the sewer utility in the city of Santa Clara.

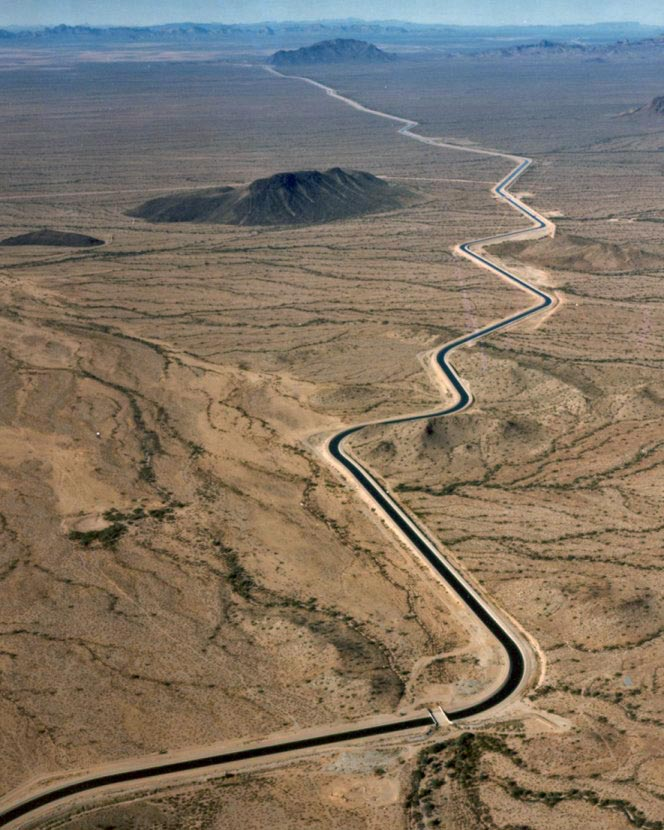
The Central Arizona Project supplies water to 80 municipal, industrial, agricultural and Indian customers in Central and Southern Arizona

Bulk water suppliers. There are also a few large bulk water suppliers in the arid Southwest of the United States, which sell water to utilities. The Metropolitan Water District of Southern California (MWD) sells treated water from the Colorado River and Northern California to its member utilities in Southern California through the California Aqueduct. Twenty-six cities and water districts serving 18 million people are members of MWD. The Central Arizona Water Conservation district supplies water from the Colorado River to 80 municipal, industrial, agricultural and Indian customers in Central and Southern Arizona through the Central Arizona Project Aqueduct (CAP).

=== Regulators ===
The economic regulation of water and sanitation service providers in the U.S. (in particular in relation to the setting of user water rates) is usually the responsibility of regulators such as Public Utility Commissions at the state level, which are organized in the National Association of Regulatory Utility Commissioners. (see economic regulator). However, while all investor-owned utilities are subject to tariff regulation, only few public utilities are subjected to the same regulation. In fact, only 12 states have laws restricting pricing practices by public water and sanitation utilities.

The environmental and drinking water quality regulation is the responsibility of state departments of health or environment and the EPA.

The Resource Conservation and Recovery Act (RCRA), protects groundwater by regulating the disposal of solid waste and hazardous waste. The Comprehensive Environmental Response, Compensation, and Liability Act (CERCLA), also known as "Superfund," requires remediation of abandoned hazardous waste sites.

=== Wastewater treatment ===
The United States Environmental Protection Agency (EPA) and state environmental agencies set wastewater standards under the Clean Water Act. Point sources must obtain surface water discharge permits through the National Pollutant Discharge Elimination System (NPDES). Point sources include industrial facilities, municipal governments (sewage treatment plants and storm sewer systems), other government facilities such as military bases, and some agricultural facilities, such as animal feedlots. EPA sets basic national wastewater standards: The "Secondary Treatment Regulation" applies to municipal sewage treatment plants, and the "Effluent guidelines" which are regulations for categories of industrial facilities.

These standards are incorporated into the permits, which may include additional treatment requirements for individual plants developed on a case-by-case basis. NPDES permits must be renewed every five years. EPA has authorized 47 state agencies to issue and enforce NPDES permits. EPA regional offices issue permits for the rest of the country.

Wastewater discharges to groundwater are regulated by the Underground Injection Control Program (UIC) under the Safe Drinking Water Act. UIC permits are issued by 34 state agencies and EPA regional offices.

Financial assistance for improvements to sewage treatment facilities is available to state and local governments through the Clean Water State Revolving Fund, a low interest loan program.

=== Other stakeholders ===
There are a number of professional associations, trade associations and other non-governmental organizations (NGOs) that are actively engaged in water supply and sanitation.

Professional associations include the American Society of Civil Engineers focused on advocacy for state revolving fund and water resource development legislation, American Water Works Association (AWWA) oriented mainly towards drinking water professionals and the Water Environment Federation (WEF) geared mainly at wastewater professionals. The geographical scope of both is greater than the U.S.: AWWA has members in 100 countries, with a focus on the U.S. and Canada, and WEF has member associations in 30 countries.

There are a number of trade associations in the sector, including:

- The National Association of Water Companies (NAWC), founded in 1895, which represents the interests of small and large private water and wastewater utilities;
- The National Association of Clean Water Agencies (NACWA), founded in 1970, which represents the interests of wastewater utilities;
- The National Rural Water Association (NRWA), founded in 1976, which represents small water and wastewater utilities;
- The Association of Metropolitan Water Agencies (AMWA), founded in 1981, which represents the interests of large publicly owned drinking water utilities.
- The Water Reuse Association, founded in 2000, which promotes water reclamation, recycling, reuse and desalination.
- The Water Quality Association, founded in 1974, which represents manufacturers and dealers of equipment for water treatment.

In addition to lobbying, some of these trade associations also provide public education, as well as training and technical assistance to their members.

An example of an NGO active in water supply and sanitation is Food & Water Watch, a consumer rights group created in 2005 which focuses on corporate and government accountability relating to food, water, and fishing. Another example is the Alliance for Water Efficiency (AWE), which was created in 2007 with seed funding from the EPA to "advocate for water efficiency research, evaluation, and education" at the national level. Its Board members "represent water utilities, environmental organizations, plumbing and appliance associations, irrigation manufacturers, the academic community, government, and others."

== Issues ==
Among the main issues facing water users and the water industry in the U.S. in 2009 are water scarcity and adaptation to climate change, concerns about combined sewer overflows and drinking water quality, and concerns about a gap between investment needs and actual investments. Other issues are concerns about a swiftly retiring workforce, the affordability of water bills for the poor during a recession, and water fluoridation, which is opposed by some mainly on ethical and safety grounds.

=== Water scarcity and climate change ===
About 1.9 trillion gallons of water are consumed within the Colorado River basin in a typical year, contributing to a severe water shortage. Most of the Colorado River basin water used by humans is used to grow feed for livestock—more than four times the amount used for crops for direct human consumption.

With water use in the United States increasing every year, many regions are starting to feel the pressure. At least 36 states are anticipating local, regional, or statewide water shortages by 2013, even under non-drought conditions.

According to the National Academies, climate change affects water supply in the U.S. in the following ways:

- Rising water demands. Hotter summers mean thirstier people and plants. In addition, more evaporation from reservoirs and irrigated farmland will lead to faster depletion of water supplies.
- Increased drought. Scientific evidence suggests that rising temperatures in the southwestern United States will reduce river flows and contribute to an increased severity, frequency, and duration of droughts.
- Seasonal supply reductions. Many utilities depend on winter snowpack to store water and then gradually release it through snowmelt during spring and summer. Warmer temperatures will accelerate snowmelt, causing the bulk of the runoff to occur earlier and potentially increasing water storage needs in these areas.

In some parts of the country water supplies are dangerously low due to drought and depletion of the aquifers, particularly in the West and the South East region of the U.S. Many of the dry, desert areas in the U.S. have this problem. According to AZCentral, "Arizona's groundwater levels are plummeting in many areas... The water levels in more than 2,000 wells have dropped more than 100 feet since they were first drilled." That sample size is approximately a fourth of Arizona's drinking-water wells.

=== Water security ===
Water security is projected to be a problem in the future since future population growth will most likely occur in areas that are currently water stressed. Ensuring that the United States remains water secure will require policies that will ensure fair distribution of existing water sources, protecting water sources from becoming depleted, maintaining good wastewater disposal, and maintaining existing water infrastructure. Currently there are no national limits for US groundwater or surface water withdrawal. If limits are imposed, the people most impacted will be the largest water withdrawers from a water source.

In 2005, 31% of US water use was for irrigation, 49% was thermoelectric power, public supply 11%, industrial was 4%, aquaculture 2%, mining 1%, domestic 1%, and livestock less than 1%.

=== Pollution ===
An important turning point in managing drinking water contamination occurred after passage of the 1974 SDWA, which required the National Academy of Sciences (NAS) to study the issue. The NAS found that there really was not a lot of information available on drinking water quality. Perhaps the most important part of the study, according to senior EPA officials responsible for implementing the 1974 law, was that it described some methodologies for doing risk assessments for chemicals that were suspected carcinogens.

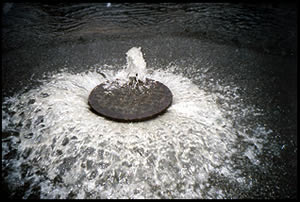
Sanitary sewer overflow

According to the 2015 US census, one-fifth of all households are not connected to a community sewer system. Furthermore, many households have wastewater disposal systems that have inadequate treatment, such as sewage systems directly piped to nearby bodies of water and septic systems leading to fecal contamination.

For example, in Michigan, 10% of the state's 1.3 million on-site wastewater treatment systems are malfunctioning, causing sewage to run into lakes and streams.

This pollution of water is contributed to several health concerns in the US, especially for minorities and low-income individuals. In Lowes County, Alabama, hookworm is affecting people today due to unsanitary waste disposal. 73% of residents reported to have sewage running into their homes and 34% of residents surveyed tested positive for hookworm. These contaminated bodies of water also directly affect drinking water supplies, habitats and recreational sites, creating more issues for the environment. Overall, the cost to replace failed sewer systems and remove fecal waste from the water is typically higher than placing alternative infrastructure and maintaining adequate functioning systems.

==== Sewer overflows ====
Combined sewer overflows (CSO) and sanitary sewer overflows affect the quality of water resources in many parts of the U.S. About 860 communities have combined sewer systems, serving about 40 million people, mostly in the Northeast and the Great Lakes Region. CSO discharges during heavy storms can cause serious water pollution. A 2004 EPA report to Congress estimated that there are 9,348 CSO outflows in the U.S., discharging about 850 billion US gallons (3.2×10^{9} m^{3}) of untreated wastewater and storm water to the environment. EPA estimates that between 23,000 and 75,000 sanitary sewer overflows occur each year, resulting in releases of between 3 and 10 billion US gallons (38,000,000 m^{3}) of untreated wastewater.

The increased frequency and intensity of rainfall as a result of climate change will result in additional water pollution from wastewater treatment, storage, and conveyance systems." For the most part, wastewater treatment plants and CSO control programs have been designed on the basis of the historic hydrologic record, taking no account of prospective changes in flow conditions due to climate change.

==== Drinking water quality ====
In 2015, 9% of 500-person-or-larger community water systems monitored by the EPA, covering approximately 21 million people, violated at least one health standard. Between 1984 and 2018, between 4 and 28% of the American population received contaminated water in any given year. There are several aspects of drinking water quality that are of some concern in the United States, including Cryptosporidium, disinfection by-products, lead, perchlorates, per- and polyfluoroalkyl substances (PFAS) and pharmaceutical substances.

While lead in drinking water continues to persist as a public health problem in some communities, the source of the lead is generally from the lead service lines, rather than the water delivered by the utility. EPA's Lead and Copper Rule (LCR) does not set an MCL, but requires a utility to take action when the lead level at a customer location reaches 0.015 mg/L. A typical utility action is to adjust the chemistry of the drinking water with anti-corrosive additives, but replacement of lead service lines (pipes that connect the water main to the home) is also an option. Most communities have avoided lead service line replacement due to the high cost.

Congress passed the Reduction of Lead in Drinking Water Act tightening the definition of "lead free" plumbing, in 2011. EPA published a final rule implementing the law on September 1, 2020.

In response to the Flint, Michigan water crisis, EPA published a revised LCR on January 15, 2021, addressing testing, pipe replacement and related issues. The rule mandates additional requirements for sampling tap water, corrosion control, public outreach and testing water in schools. The rule continues the requirement for replacement of lead service lines when the "action level" for lead is exceeded, but requires that a utility replace at least 3 percent of its lines annually, compared to 7 percent under the prior regulation. EPA published an updated LCR on October 8, 2024, which requires the removal of all lead pipes within ten years. The regulation also lowers the action level of lead contamination to 10ppb from the current limit of 15ppb (effective in 2027). EPA's Consumer Confidence Rule of 1998 requires most public water suppliers to provide consumer confidence reports, also known as annual water quality reports, to their customers. Each year by July 1 anyone connected to a public water system should receive in the mail an annual water quality report that tells where water in a specific locality comes from and what's in it. Consumers can find out about these local reports on a map provided by EPA. 29% of Americans are reading their water quality reports. A 2003 survey found that customers were generally satisfied with the information they are receiving from their water companies and their local or state environmental offices.

EPA published a proposed rule for perchlorate on June 26, 2019, with a proposed MCL of 0.056 mg/L for public water systems. On July 21, 2020, EPA announced that it was withdrawing its 2019 proposal, stating that it had taken "proactive steps" with state and local governments to address perchlorate contamination. In September 2020 the Natural Resources Defense Council filed suit against EPA for its failure to regulate perchlorate, and stated that 26 million people may be affected by perchlorate in their drinking water. Under a court order, EPA agreed to publish a proposed perchlorate rule in 2025 and issue a final rule in 2027.

EPA issued drinking water standards in April 2024 for six PFAS chemicals: perfluorooctanoic acid (PFOA), perfluorooctanesulfonic acid (PFOS), GenX, perfluorobutanesulfonic acid (PFBS), perfluorohexanesulfonic acid (PFHxS) and perfluorononanoic acid (PFNA).

==== Groundwater pollution ====
In November 2006, EPA published its Ground Water Rule, due to concerns that public water systems supplied by ground water would be vulnerable to contamination from harmful microorganisms, including fecal matter. The objective of the regulation, promulgated under the authority of the Safe Drinking Water Act, is to keep microbial pathogens out of public water sources.

Congress recognized that injection wells were a potential threat to groundwater quality when they passed the Safe Drinking Water Act (SDWA) of 1974. This instructed the U.S. Environmental Protection Agency (EPA) to create a national program that would prevent underground injection activities that would endanger underground drinking sources. The EPA must regulate underground injection of fluids and wastes through wells that discharge or may release such material into or above an underground reservoir of drinkable water. The EPA has promoted several Underground Injection Control (UCI) regulations in order to protect underground reservoirs of drinkable water from being contaminated.

=== Investment gap ===
In its Infrastructure Report Card the American Society of Civil Engineers (ASCE) gave both the U.S. drinking water and wastewater infrastructure a grade of D− in 2005, down from D in 2001. According to the report, "the nation's drinking water system faces a staggering public investment need to replace aging facilities, comply with safe drinking water regulations and meet future needs." Investment needs are about $19 billion/year for sanitation and $14 billion/year for drinking water, totaling $33 billion/year. State and local governments invested $35.1 billion in water supply and sanitation in 2008, including 16.3 billion for drinking water supply and 18.8 billion for sanitation.

In 2013 the ASCE rating remained at the "D" level, and a 2013 paper from Stanford University's Center for Reinventing the Nation's Urban Water Infrastructure (ReNUWIt) describes why "water infrastructure is systemically resistant to innovation":

Despite a growing sense that water will be as important a global issue as energy in the coming century, capital deployed for water resources "pales in comparison to that for renewable energy." ... Only 5 percent of the $4.3 billion in VC money invested in the clean tech industry goes to water technologies. Federal support is also on the decline. The membranes that today enable desalinization and water reuse, for example, were the fruits of R&D undertaken during the Kennedy administration. We now spend ten times less on that research.

The Stanford paper notes that innovations occur when utilities see opportunities for "short-term benefits and immediate savings," when there are water shortages, and in quality of life situations, like Philadelphia's "green infrastructure initiative designed to reduce combined sewer overflow."

Concerning drinking water supply, EPA estimated in 2003 that $276.8 billion would have to be invested between 2003 and 2023. Concerning sanitation, EPA estimated in 2007 that investment of $202.5 billion is needed over the next 20 years to control wastewater pollution. This includes $134 billion for wastewater treatment and collection, $54.8 billion for resolving unsatisfactory combined sewer overflows and $9 billion for stormwater management. The EPA needs surveys do not capture all investment needs, in particular concerning capital replacement.

=== Access ===
In the U.S., in 2020, about 8.9 million people (about 2.68% of the population at that time) still lacked access to a household "safely managed" water sources. Regarding sanitation, in 2020, around 5.7 million (about 1.74% of the population at that time) people did not have access to a household "safely managed sanitation" system. More than 99% of the U.S. population has access to "complete plumbing facilities" which is defined as having hot and cold piped water, a bathtub or shower, and a flush toilet.

However, more than 1.6 million people in the United States, in 630,000 households, still lacked basic plumbing facilities as of 2014. This includes access to a toilet, shower, or running water. Of the millions who lack access to clean water, the majority are low-income individuals who are people of color, belong to tribal communities, and/or are immigrants. These groups often live in rural areas which are more susceptible to water quality violations than urban areas. Many of these violations are due to poor-quality sources of water and the lack of resources to maintain the current water infrastructure regulations. These violations are heightened in low-income minority communities because these communities were often disregarded when it came to drafting regulations and creating new infrastructure. A 2017 study utilized data from the Safe Drinking Water Information System (SDWIS) and discovered that a significant amount of water quality violations were associated with higher Hispanic and Black populations. In addition, low income people of color experienced more violations than low income White, non-Hispanic communities.

In results from the American Community Survey (ACS), race was established as the biggest factor in determining people's access to clean water. In the United States, 0.3 percent of White households lack complete plumbing. When looking at this same variable under different ethnic groups, 0.5 percent of African-American and Latino households and 5.8 percent of Native-American households lack complete plumbing. The ACS highlights the disparities in access to clean water that come alongside different racial and ethnic groups.

These disparities in access to clean water are most pronounced when viewing certain minority groups that are also poor. The previous 2017 SDWIS study examined the number of violations reported when looking at different ethnic groups and their level of poverty. When looking at communities where 10% were below the poverty line, an increase from 0% to 80% of the population being Hispanic resulted in a change in the number of violations reported from 0.10 to 0.11. However, when looking at communities where 40% were below the poverty line, the same increase in the Hispanic population resulted in a change from 0.09 to 0.17. This study concluded that these ethnic disparities in access to clean water are prominent when incorporating low-income communities as well.

==== Historical causes of limited access to water ====
As a direct result of structural racism as well as environmental racism, there has been this systemic failure to provide equal resources and services to all Americans regardless of their race or income. Individuals do not choose to have incomplete plumbing, but rather, it is a result of government policy that intentionally excluded those communities. In the 1930s, the U.S. government relocated many American Indians to rural and isolated areas. These areas lacked the resources to not only create proper water infrastructure but also employ proper sanitation techniques. In addition to this mistreatment, the passing of new laws and regulations made it difficult for Native Americans to voice their concerns which only furthered their decay regarding their access to clean water.

In 1954, the city of Zanesville, Ohio discriminated against African American residents by limiting their access to water lines. When constructing these water lines, the city specifically ignored entire neighborhoods that were home to African-Americans. This incident highlights the discrimination that many disadvantaged communities faced that prevented their access to clean water.

Between 1950 and 2000, several water infrastructure initiatives were debuted in California, but they were exclusive in the communities that they protected. During this time period, California took measures to prevent the integration of the Hispanic/Latino community which resulted in the lack of consideration when crafting certain infrastructure. These communities were not accounted for and had to resort to decentralized water sources and poor sanitation techniques. The lack of inclusion of certain groups in California in water policy contributed to the overall deterioration of these regions.

When examining specific aspects of water policy, the majority tends to focus on protecting drinking water from over extraction by businesses for commercial purposes rather than outlining local requirements for drinking water. While the rest of the United States began to benefit from closer accessibility to water, these specific communities were ignored, evident through the creation of new laws and regulations.

===== Affected regions across the United States =====
Today, there are still communities around the United States that do not have access to clean water. While some regions have developed alternatives to deal with this inaccessibility, others are still struggling with this issue.

In Central Valley, California, residents claim that water is their biggest issue threatening their security and survival. Although they have water that is accessible, it is extremely contaminated therefore residents are forced to travel long distances to acquire suitable drinking water. There is a high cost that comes with attaining potable water which is why many in Central Valley have had no choice other than to relocate to different regions. Regarding the demographics of Central Valley, the population is a combination of migrants that settled in the 1900s. These migrants were Black, Latino, and Asian and the majority were low-income. This initial establishment set the tone for the current state of Central Valley today. More than 50% of all drinking water violations that are reported in California come from the Central Valley. In 2006, it was discovered that 20% of the public water in Central Valley violated the state's maximum contamination level. As a result, many are exposed to higher rates of nitrate which can damage one's reproductive ability or even increase the likelihood of birth defects and miscarriages. In addition, coliform bacteria and other bacterial contaminants can be found in the public water and are responsible for a number of waterborne diseases. This situation is a direct result of these communities being continuously disregarded when it comes to the implementation of policy. The combination of racial discrimination and poverty can be credited to the ongoing water crisis in Central Valley.

In the American South, many experience issues with wastewater, specifically due to the development of contamination sites and hazardous waste sites. Spanning all the way from Delaware to Texas, the southern "blackbelt" is 54% Black. These residents lack proper plumbing systems and access to proper sanitation. These contamination sites are often placed around communities that are composed of minorities, specifically Black and Hispanic individuals. In 1983 the Government Accountability Office (formerly the General Accounting Office) published a study examining the relationship between the location of hazardous waste sites and the racial and economic status of the surrounding residents. It was discovered that race was the greatest predictor of the location of a contamination site. Close proximity to toxic landfills and long term exposure to wastewater results in a myriad of health implications. A 2017 study performed by Baylor College of Medicine examined the development of parasites in Lowndes County, Alabama — a region where 73% of its residents are Black and 31.4% of residents live below the poverty line. It was discovered that 34.5% of individuals living in this high-risk environment tested positive for hookworm, a parasite linked to wastewater. In addition, 73% of the participants in the study reported exposure to raw sewage inside of their homes. The establishment of contamination sites is directly linked to the location of certain racial groups, emphasizing how the accessibility of clean water disproportionately affects people of color.

In Flint, Michigan, residents consumed drinking water that contained high amounts of lead which resulted in a variety of negative health effects. The city of Flint is composed of low income African Americans who experienced a shift in their water supply due to financial limitations. Their water supply was switched from the City of Detroit's Huron Water Supply to water from the Flint River in 2014. A group of researchers at Virginia Tech discovered that the water in the Flint River was highly corrosive due to the inflated levels of lead found in the water. The decision to switch water sources was made on the state level and completely disregarded the potential impacts it could have had on the communities living in Flint, Michigan. Residents argue that this issue was a result of Michigan's economic history and political decision-making that often left Flint in the dark. The water crisis in Flint highlights the racial disparities that are evident when examining certain regions' access to clean water.

==== Federal spending on water accessibility ====
Since the late twentieth century, there has been a shift in money and resources allocated towards funding new water infrastructure. As of 2000, federal funding for water accessibility had dropped nearly 70% since the 1980s. In addition, federal spending declined from $76 per person in 1977 to just $11 per person in 2014. The responsibility of funding water and sanitation projects has moved from the federal government to local governments. While this method may be sustainable for a large majority of communities, groups that are located in impoverished areas do not have the financial resources to embark on large water projects. In the last several years, local and state governments have been forced to increase their spending to compensate for the withdrawal of federal funds.

The main reason for this redistribution of money is due to the federal government's shift in focus onto other projects such as transportation, research, and education. In 2008 the New York State Department of Environmental Conservation performed a study and determined that in order for New York to maintain and update current water infrastructure, it would require $36.2 billion, a number much greater than the EPA's estimate of $21.8 billion. By reallocating funds to meet water infrastructure needs, the estimated gain in annual economic activity would be above $220 billion and improve the accessibility of water for many.

With low income minority communities already being disproportionately affected by water access issues, the cut in federal spending only furthers the disparities that these groups face. These communities lack the resources to solve this issue on their own and look towards the federal government for assistance. However, their lack of involvement and general disregard for these communities leads to the continuation of their troubles.

=== Pricing and affordability ===
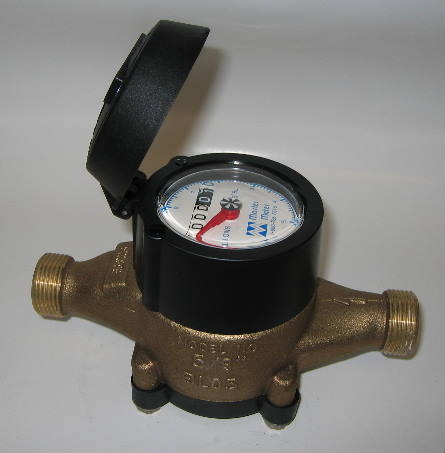
Water meters are a prerequisite for accurate, volumetric billing of water users

The median household in the U.S. spent about 1.1% of its income on water and sewerage in 2002. However, poor households face a different situation: In 1997 18% of U.S. households, many of them poor, paid more than 4% of their income on their water and sewer bill.

The mean U.S. water tariff – excluding sewer tariffs – was $2.72 per 1,000 gallons ($0.72 per cubic meter) in 2000, with significant variations between localities. Average residential water tariffs for a monthly consumption of 15 cubic meters varied between $0.35 per cubic meter in Chicago and $3.01 in Atlanta in 2007. The combined water and sewer tariff was $0.64 in Chicago and $3.01 in Atlanta, with Atlanta not charging separately for sewer services. Annual combined water and sewer bills vary between $228 in Chicago and $1,476 in Atlanta in 2008. For purposes of comparison, the average water and sewer bill in England and Wales in 2008 was equivalent to $466.

The average annual increase in typical residential water bills was approximately 5.3 percent from 2001 through 2009, while the increase in typical residential sewer bills was approximately 5.5 percent according to data from the 50 Largest Cities Water and Wastewater Rate Survey by Black & Veatch.

=== Retiring workforce ===
The water community in the US is faced with a swiftly retiring workforce and a tightening market place for new workers. In 2008, approximately one third of executives and managers were expected to retire in the following five years. Water and sanitation utilities in the United States had 41,922 employees in 2002.

=== Fluoridation ===
Water fluoridation, the controlled addition of moderate concentrations of fluoride to a public water supply to reduce tooth decay, is used for about two-thirds of the U.S. population on public water systems. Almost all major public health and dental organizations support water fluoridation, or consider it safe. Nevertheless, it is contentious for ethical, safety, and efficacy reasons.

== Responses to address issues ==
=== Supply-side management ===
Historically the predominant response to increasing water demand in the U.S. has been to tap into ever more distant sources of conventional water supply, in particular rivers. Because of environmental concerns and limitations in the availability of water resources, including droughts that may be due to climate change, this approach now is in many cases not feasible any more. Still, supply-side management is often being pursued tapping into non-conventional water resources, in particular seawater desalination in coastal areas with high population growth. California alone had plans to build 21 desalination plants in 2006 with a total capacity of 450 million US gallons (1,700,000 m^{3}) per day, which would represent a massive 70-fold increase over current seawater desalination capacity in the state. In 2007 the largest desalination plant in the United States is the one at Tampa Bay, Florida, which began desalinating 25 million US gallons (95,000 m^{3}) of water per day in December 2007.

Industrial water as a share of total water withdrawals

In 2005 over 2,000 desalination plants with a capacity of more than 100m3/day had been installed or contracted in every state in the U.S. with a total capacity of more than 6 million m3/day. Only 7% of that capacity was for seawater desalination, while 51% used brackish water and 26% used river water as water source. The contracted capacity corresponds to 2.4% of total municipal and industrial water use in the country in 2000. The actual share of desalinated water is lower, because some of the contracted capacity was never built or never operated, was closed down or is not operated at full capacity.

In 2017, the U.S. Global Water Strategy was passed, where the U.S. Government will work with countries in order to achieve four objectives: increase access to safe drinking water, while promoting hygienes and sanitation services, protect freshwater resources, promote cooperation on shared waters, and strengthen water financing.

=== Demand-side management ===
Demand-side management, including the reduction of leakage in the distribution network and water conservation, are other options that are being considered and, in some cases, also applied to address water scarcity. For example, Seattle has reduced per capita water use from 152 US gallons (580 L) per day in 1990 to 97 US gallons (370 L) per day in 2007 through a comprehensive water conservation program including pricing policies, education, regulations and rebates for water-saving appliances. Other cities such as Atlanta and Las Vegas have also launched water conservation programs that are somewhat less comprehensive than the one in Seattle concerning indoor water use. However, Las Vegas has intentionally focused on curbing outdoor water demand, which accounts for 70% of residential water use in the city, through reductions in turf area and incentives for the use of rains sensors, irrigation controllers and pool covers. At the federal level, the Energy Policy Act of 1992 set standards for water-efficient appliances, replacing the 3.5 US gallons (13 L) per flush (gpf) toilet with a new 1.6 gpf/6 litres per flush maximum standard for all new toilets. By 1994, federal law mandated that showerheads and faucets sold in the U.S. release no more than 2.5 and 2.2 US gallons (8.3 L) of water per minute respectively. Also in 1994 the AWWA established a clearinghouse for water conservation, efficiency, and demand management, called WaterWiser, to assist water conservation professionals and the general public in using water more efficiently. In 2006 the EPA launched its WaterSense program to encourage water efficiency beyond the standards set by the Energy Policy Act through the use of a special label on consumer products. The Obama administration further tightened the 2.5-gallons-per-minute rule so that fixtures with multiple showerheads could only use that amount collectively. The Trump administration loosened that part of the rule to consider each showerhead individually. In 2021, the Biden administration proposed restoring the Obama version.

Distributional losses in the U.S. are typically 10–15% of total withdrawals, although they can exceed 25% of total water use in older systems. According to another source unaccounted-for water (UFW) – which includes system losses, water used for firefighting and water used in the treatment process – was estimated to be only 8% in systems with more than 500,000 connections in 2000. In comparison, the level of water losses is 7% in Germany, 19% in England and Wales, and 26% in France. Together with Germany water losses in the U.S. are thus among the lowest in 16 industrial countries.

Low water tariffs and inappropriate tariff structures do not encourage water conservation. For example, decreasing-block rates, under which the unit rate decreases with consumption, offer hardly any incentive for water conservation. In 2000 about 51% of water tariffs in the U.S.were uniform (i.e. the unit tariff is independent of the level of consumption), 12% were increasing-block tariffs (the unit rate increases with consumption) and 19% were decreasing-block tariffs. The use of decreasing-block tariffs declined sharply from 45% of all tariff structures in 1992. Sewer rates are often flat rates that are not linked to consumption, thus offering no incentive to conserve water.

=== Water reuse ===
Reuse of reclaimed water is an increasingly common response to water scarcity in many parts of the United States. Reclaimed water is being reused directly for various non-potable uses in the United States, including urban landscape irrigation of parks, school yards, highway medians and golf courses; fire protection; commercial uses such as vehicle washing; industrial reuse such as cooling water, boiler water and process water; environmental and recreational uses such as the creation or restoration of wetlands; as well as agricultural irrigation. In some cases, such as in Irvine Ranch Water District in Orange County, it is also used for flushing toilets.

It was estimated that in 2002 a total of 1.7 billion US gallons (6,400,000 m^{3}) per day, or almost 3% of public water supply, were being directly reused. California reused 0.6 and Florida 0.5 billion US gallons (1,900,000 m^{3}) per day respectively. Twenty-five states had regulations regarding the use of reclaimed water in 2002. Planned direct reuse of reclaimed water was initiated in 1932 with the construction of a reclaimed water facility at San Francisco's Golden Gate Park. Reclaimed water is typically distributed with a color-coded dual piping network that keeps reclaimed water pipes completely separate from potable water pipes.

The leaders in use of reclaimed water in the U.S. are Florida and California, with Irvine Ranch Water District as one of the leading developers. They were the first district to approve the use of reclaimed water for in-building piping and use in flushing toilets. In places like Florida, where it is necessary to avoid nutrient overload of sensitive receiving water, reuse of treated or reclaimed water can be more economically feasible than meeting the higher standards for surface water disposal mandated by the Clean Water Act.

In a January 2012 U.S. National Research Council report, a committee of independent experts found that expanding the reuse of municipal wastewater for irrigation, industrial uses, and drinking water augmentation could significantly increase the United States' total available water resources. The committee noted that a portfolio of treatment options is available to mitigate water quality issues in reclaimed water. The report also includes a risk analysis that suggests the risk of exposure to certain microbial and chemical contaminants from drinking reclaimed water is not any higher than the risk from drinking water from current water treatment systems—and in some cases, may be orders of magnitude lower. The report concludes that adjustments to the federal regulatory framework could enhance public health protection and increase public confidence in water reuse.

There are examples of communities that have safely used recycled water for many years. Los Angeles County's sanitation districts have provided treated wastewater for landscape irrigation in parks and golf courses since 1929. The first reclaimed water facility in California was built at San Francisco's Golden Gate Park in 1932. The Water Replenishment District of Southern California was the first groundwater agency to obtain permitted use of recycled water for groundwater recharge in 1962.

Orange County is located in Southern California, USA, and houses a classic example in indirect potable reuse. A large-scale artificial groundwater recharge scheme exists in the area, providing a much-needed freshwater barrier to intruding seawater. Part of the injected water consists of recycled water, which started in 1976 with Water Factory 21, which used RO and high lime to clean the water (production capacity of 19,000 m^{3} per day). This plant was decommissioned in 2004 and has since made place for a new project with a higher capacity (265,000 m^{3} per day with an ultimate capacity of 492,000 m^{3} per day), under the name of Groundwater Replenishment System.

The Irvine Ranch Water District (IRWD) was the first water district in California to receive an unrestricted use permit from the state for its recycled water; such a permit means that water can be used for any purpose except drinking. IRWD maintains one of the largest recycled water systems in the nation with more than 400 miles serving more than 4,500 metered connections. The Irvine Ranch Water District and Orange County Water District in Southern California are established leaders in recycled water. Further, the Orange County Water District, located in Orange County, water is given more advanced treatments and is used indirectly for drinking.

The Trinity River in Texas is a representative example of an effluent-dominated surface water system where de facto potable water reuse occurs. The section of the river south of Dallas/Fort Worth consists almost entirely of wastewater effluent under base flow conditions. In response to concerns about nutrients, the wastewater treatment plants in Dallas/Fort Worth that collectively discharge about 2 million m^{3} per day of effluent employ nutrient removal processes. Little dilution of the effluent-dominated waters occurs as the water travels from Dallas/Fort Worth to Lake Livingston, which is one of the main drinking water reservoirs for Houston. Once the water reaches Lake Livingston, it is subjected to conventional drinking water treatment prior to delivery to consumers in Houston.

==== Non-potable reuse (NPR) ====
- Austin, Texas
- Clark County, Nevada
- Clearwater, Florida
- Contra Costa County, California
- San Antonio operates the largest recycled water system in the United States.
- Tucson, Arizona
- San Diego, California (San Diego County)
- St. Petersburg, Florida

==== Indirect potable reuse (IPR) ====
Orange County is located in Southern California, USA, and houses a classic example in IPR. A large-scale artificial groundwater recharge scheme exists in the area, providing a much-needed freshwater barrier to intruding seawater. Part of the injected water consists of recycled water, starting as of 1976 with Water Factory 21, which used RO and high lime to clean the water (production capacity of 19,000 m^{3} per day). This plant was de-commissioned in 2004 and has since made place for a new project with a higher capacity (265,000 m^{3} per day with an ultimate capacity of 492,000 m^{3} per day), under the name of Groundwater Replenishment System. This newer scheme uses the newer technological combination of RO, MF, and ultraviolet light with hydrogen peroxide. Plans are also underway to further increase the capacity of the system, which already provides up to 20% of the water used by the country.

In the US, San Diego, California is the leading state implementing IPR. MF, RO and UV/H_{2}O_{2} are employed prior to groundwater replenishment with the treated effluents (CDPH, 2013). In San Diego, the effort to increase the share of recycled water was rekindled with an extensive study in 2006. MF provides substantial removal of the dissolved effluent organic matter (dEfOM), while dEfOM reduction down to 0.5 mg/L (in terms of TOC) is achieved through RO application. The chemical oxidation treatment (UV/H_{2}O_{2}) following the membrane steps, results in the mitigation of N-nitrosodimethylamine (NDMA), as well as in the improvement of the effluent quality with respect to its organic content.

The City of El Paso's (Texas, USA) water sources include groundwater aquifers and surface water from the Rio Grande. In order to increase groundwater levels, the El Paso Water Utilities injects advanced treated reclaimed water into the aquifer. The advanced treatment facilities use two-stage powdered activated carbon (PAC), addition of lime, two-stage recarbonation, sand filtration, ozonation, granular activated carbon (GAC), and chlorination for purifying the water. The Hueco Bolson Recharge Project, which initially began in 1985, currently recharges 1,700 acre-feet per year of reclaimed water at 10 injection wells and 800 acre-feet per year at an infiltration basin for groundwater recharge.

In Colorado, USA, the Colorado River Municipal Water District implemented a project to capture treated municipal effluent from the City of Big Spring, and provide additional advanced treatment prior to blending into their raw surface water delivery system (2012). Advanced treatment of the municipal effluent consisted of MF, RO, and ultraviolet oxidation, producing very high quality water, which is blended with surface water from Lake E.V. Spence for distribution to their member and customer cities (production of 6,700 m^{3} per day).

Further examples:

- Big Spring, Texas indirect potable reuse program
- Orange County, California
- Pasadena, California
- Payson, Arizona
- The Torreele project in the Veurne coastal region of Belgium, which began operating in 2002"
- Virginia Occoquan Reservoir – The Upper Occoquan Sewage Authority plant discharges its highly treated output to supply roughly 20% of the inflow into the Occoquan Reservoir, which provides drinking water used by the Fairfax County Water Authority – one of the three major water providers in the Washington, D.C. metropolitan area.
- Windhoek, Namibia
- Wichita Falls, Texas (toilet-to-tap reuse as a temporary measure during drought conditions, 2014–2015; Indirect potable use 2015)

==== Direct potable reuse (DPR) ====
In July 2014, the city of Wichita Falls, Texas (USA), became one of the first in the United States to use treated wastewater directly in its drinking water supply (production of 45,000–60,000 m^{3} per day). Treated wastewater is disinfected and pumped to the Cypress Water Treatment Plant where it goes through clarification, microfiltration (MF), reverse osmosis (RO), and ultraviolet light disinfection before being released into a holding lagoon where it is blended with lake water (50:50). The blended water goes through a seven-step conventional surface water treatment.

Proposed projects:

- Los Angeles, California – By 2019, the Los Angeles Department of Water and Power will build a plant to replenish their groundwater aquifer with purified water in order to deal with the shortage of rain and snow fall, restricted water imports and local groundwater contamination.
- San Diego, California (San Diego County)

=== Pollution control ===
Numerous efforts have been undertaken in the United States to control the pollution of water resources and to make drinking water safe. The most comprehensive federal regulations and standards for the water treatment industry were implemented in the 1970s, in reaction to a huge increase in environmental concerns in the country. In 1972, Congress passed the Clean Water Act (CWA), with the unprecedented goal of eliminating all water pollution by 1985 and authorized expenditures of $24.6 billion in research and construction grants. In 1974, Congress passed the Safe Drinking Water Act, specifying a number of contaminants that had to be closely monitored and reported to residents should they exceed the maximum contaminant levels. The CWA included substantial federal grant funding to improve sewage treatment infrastructure in the form of construction grants to local governments.

The 1987 Water Quality Act amended the CWA, replacing the sewage treatment construction grant program with a system of subsidized loans, using the Clean Water State Revolving Fund (CWSRF). The loans use a combination of 80% federal funds and 20% matching funds from states. New challenges arose, such as the need to address combined sewer overflows for which EPA issued a policy in 1994, and which was codified into law by Congress in 2000. In 1996 Congress established the Drinking Water State Revolving Fund, in order to finance investments to improve compliance with more stringent drinking water quality standards.

Today cities make significant investments in the control of combined sewer overflows, including through the construction of storage facilities in the sewerage system in order to allow for the subsequent controlled release of sewage into treatment plants.

=== Federal assistance ===
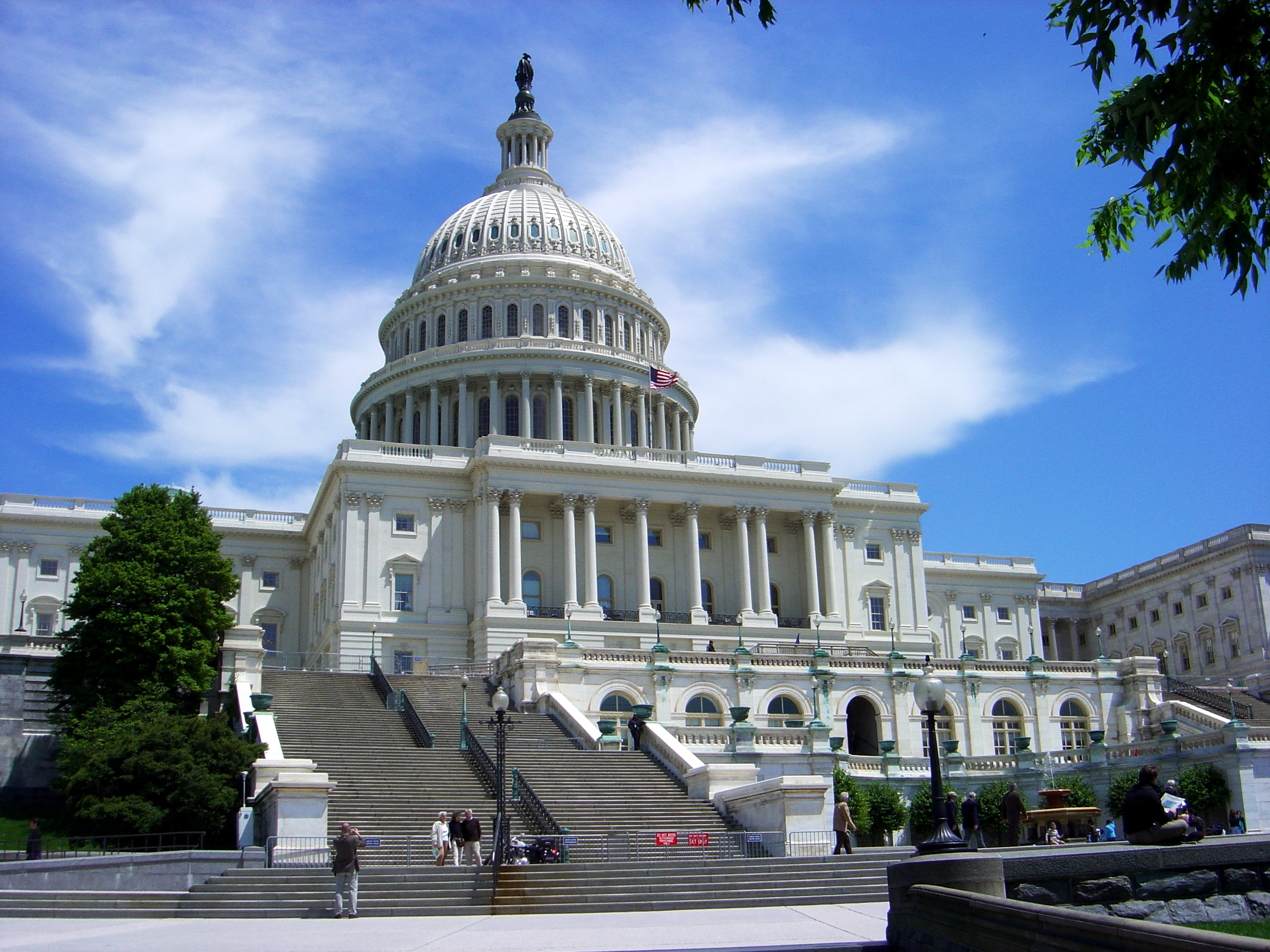
The United States Congress approves federal funding for water and sanitation, including through state revolving funds.

One way to address the funding needs of utilities to respond to the various challenges they face without increasing the burden of water bills on users is federal financial assistance.

Centralized water and sanitation infrastructure is typically financed through utilities' own revenue or debt. Debt can be in the form of soft loans from state revolving funds (SRF), credits from commercial Banks or – in the case of large utilities – from bonds issued directly in the capital market. In the case of water supply (i.e. excluding sanitation), 42% of investments were financed by private sector borrowing, 39% by current revenues, 13% by government loans including the Drinking Water SRF, 5% by government grants and 1% from other sources. There are two SRFs: The larger Clean Water State Revolving Fund, created in 1987, and the smaller Drinking Water State Revolving Fund, created in 1997. They receive federal and state contributions and issue bonds. In turn, they provide soft loans to utilities in their respective states, with average interest rates at 2% for up to 20 years in the case of the Clean Water State Revolving Fund. In addition to the SRFs, the United States Department of Agriculture provides grants, loans and loan guarantees for water supply and sanitation in small communities (those with less than 10,000 inhabitants), together with technical assistance and training.

The American Recovery and Reinvestment Act of February 17, 2009, provided $4 billion for the Clean Water SRF, $2 billion for the Drinking Water SRF and, among others, $126 million for water recycling projects through the United States Bureau of Reclamation. This program exceeded previous levels of financing, since Congress approved only US$1.5 billion of federal funding for State Revolving Funds in 2008. This was much below the historical average of US$3 billion/year for the Clean Water State Revolving Fund (1987–2006) and US$1.2 billion/year for the Drinking Water State Revolving Fund (1997–2005). The share of federal funding for sanitation has declined from almost 50% in the early 1980s to about 20% in the early 1990s. A May 2016 article asserted that there has been "a huge federal retreat from helping cities fund water projects," stating that overall federal spending on water utilities "has dropped 75 percent since 1977," and that experts expect more situations like the Flint water crisis to emerge.

Congress passed the Water Infrastructure Finance and Innovation Act of 2014 (WIFIA) to provide an expanded credit program for water and wastewater infrastructure projects, with broader eligibility criteria than the previously authorized revolving funds. Pursuant to the act, EPA established its Water Infrastructure and Resiliency Finance Center in 2015 to help local governments and municipal utilities design innovative financing mechanisms, including public-private partnerships. It is part of the federal government's Build American Investment Initiative. Congress amended the WIFIA program in 2015 and 2016. One of the envisaged instruments to boost financing in water infrastructure are Qualified Public Infrastructure Bonds (QPIBs), tax-exempt municipal bonds that can be used by private companies.

=== Protecting water utilities from terrorist attack ===
In 2007 EPA stated, "Improving the security of our nation's drinking water and wastewater infrastructures has become a top priority since the events of 9/11. Significant actions are underway to assess and reduce vulnerabilities to potential terrorist attacks; to plan for and practice response to emergencies and incidents; and to develop new security technologies to detect and monitor contaminants and prevent security breaches."

One of the most important elements of water security is early and accurate contamination detection. The EPA has issued advisory material and guidelines for contamination warning systems to be implemented in water utilities and supplies. The security challenges that utilities frequently revolve around fast detection, accuracy, and the ability to take fast action when there is a water problem. If contamination is detected early enough, it can be prevented from reaching consumers, and emergency water supplies can be put into effect.

In cases where contamination might still reach consumers, fast and efficient communication systems are necessary. All these factors also point to the need for organized and practiced emergency procedures and preparedness.

Since 2002, under the Bioterrorism Act, a water utility supplying more than 3,300 people must take at least the following measures to ensure security of the water supply:

- Conduct an assessment of the facility's vulnerabilities to vandalism, insider sabotage, or terrorist attack, and submit the report to the EPA.
- Show that the facility has an up-to-date emergency response plan, should an incident occur.

More recently, under the Drinking Water Security Act of 2009, the EPA is now required to establish risk-based performance standards for community water systems serving more than 3,300 people.

== See also ==
- Bottled water in the United States
- Environment of the United States
- History of public health in the United States
- History of public health in New York City
- History of public health in Chicago
- List of water supply and sanitation by country
