= Sewage regulation and administration =

Sewage disposal regulation and administration describes the governance of sewage treatment and disposal.

== Regulation ==
=== United States ===
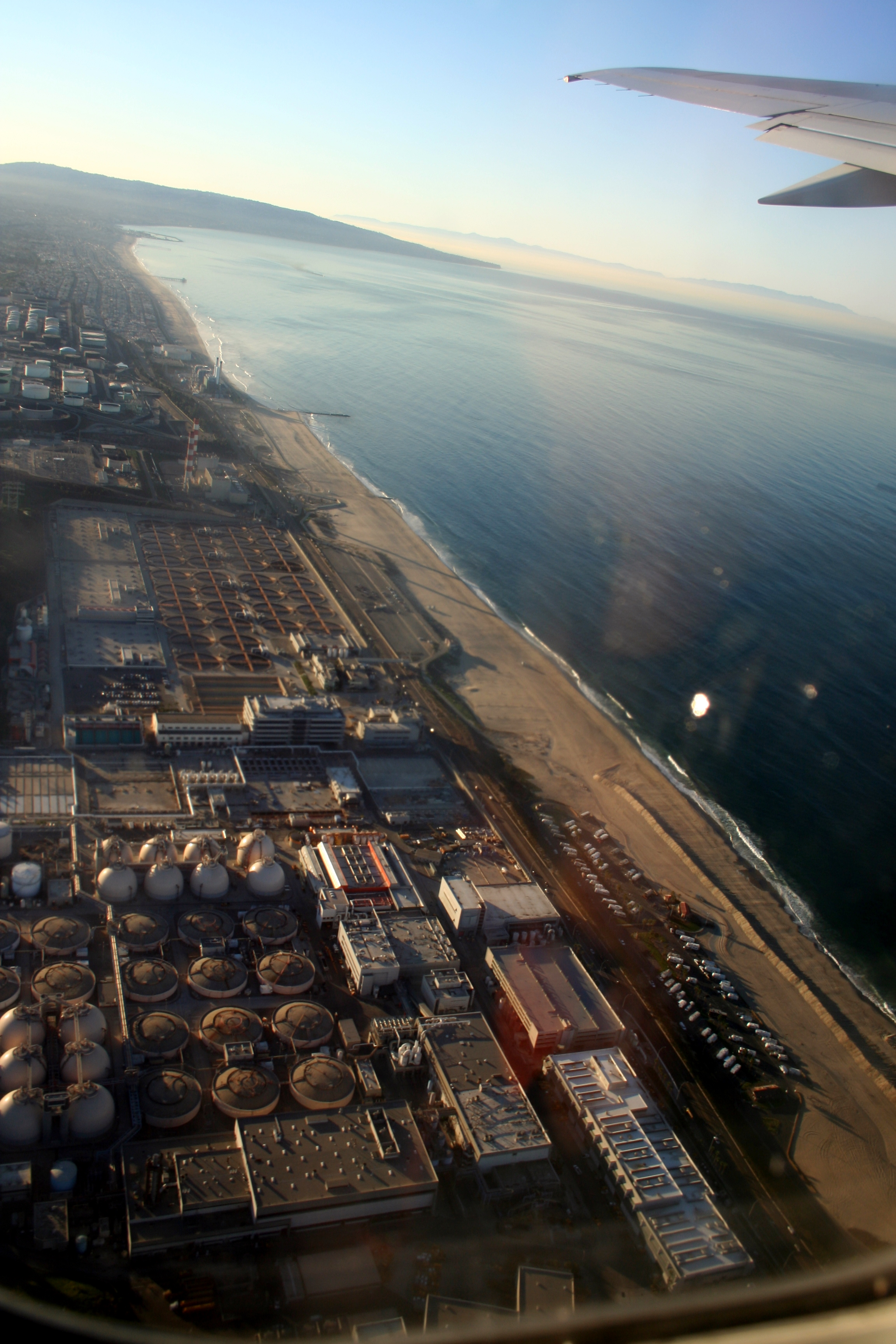
The Hyperion Wastewater Treatment Plant in Los Angeles, California, is one of the largest municipal plants in the United States.

Sewage treatment systems in the United States are subject to the Clean Water Act (CWA) and are regulated by federal and state environmental agencies. In most states, local sewage plants receive discharge permits from state agencies; in the remaining states and territories, permits are issued by the United States Environmental Protection Agency (EPA). The treatment plants, known as publicly owned treatment works (POTW) in CWA parlance, must protect the health and welfare of the local population by ensuring that wastewater does not contaminate the local potable water supply, nor violate additional water quality standards that protect the ecological health of the water body.

The basic national standard for U.S. municipal treatment plants is the Secondary Treatment Regulation. Most plants in the U.S. must meet this secondary treatment standard. The permit authority (state agency or EPA) can compel a POTW to meet a higher standard, if there are applicable water quality standards for the receiving water body. For water bodies with stringent standards, such as Lake Tahoe, POTWs must treat their discharges to tertiary treatment levels, and then pump all treated water out of the drainage basin so that no effluent ever drains to a certain body of water. Such higher standards may require the POTW to construct improvements to its plant(s). If not in compliance with its permit and regulations, POTWs may be subject to heavy fines. Regulation is therefore often the driving force behind increasing sewage treatment costs in the United States, and is directly linked to the high cost of constructing or expanding a sewage treatment facility.

Many large cities in the U.S. operate combined sewers, which collect sewage and stormwater runoff in a single pipe system leading to the treatment plant. Combined sewers can cause serious water pollution problems due to combined sewer overflows, which are caused by large variations in flow between dry and wet weather. These overflows can lead to violation of the Secondary Treatment Regulation and/or water quality standards. Discharge permits for these POTWs typically have additional requirements that require facility improvements to reduce or eliminate the overflows.

U.S. armed forces vessels are forbidden from discharging their sewage overboard unless three miles or more from shore. Sewage discharged by large commercial vessels (except fishing vessels) are regulated by the EPA Vessels General Permit. Discharges from fishing vessels and other small vessels are regulated by the United States Coast Guard. See Regulation of ship pollution in the United States.

=== United Kingdom ===
In England and Wales, Ofwat regulates charges and service standards. In England environmental standards and their achievement for sewage disposal are regulated by the Environment Agency. In Wales environmental regulation is undertaken by Natural Resources Wales. In Scotland the Scottish Environment Protection Agency fulfils the environmental regulation role and the Water Industry Commission for Scotland undertakes the economic regulatory role.

== Administration ==
=== United States ===
Sewer systems are usually administered on the local level, usually citywide, and usually by the city itself. These systems, which may operate independently or as a subdivision of a city or other municipal agency, are typically operated as Enterprises, meaning that they produce enough revenues to fund their own activities.

Revenues are usually generated through two charges to customers: connection fees and use charges. Connection fees are charged once to new customers as they connect to the sanitary sewer collection system, and are usually designed to recover capital investments made by the enterprise to serve its customers. Use charges are periodic charges for ongoing use of the system, and are designed to recover operations and maintenance expenses. Both connection fees and use charges are typically proportionate to the amount and strength of wastewater expected to be generated by each customer. Therefore, a single family residence would pay much smaller fees and charges than a food processing plant.

Some POTWs are eligible for low-interest loans to finance system improvements, from the Clean Water State Revolving Fund. This program is administered by EPA and state agencies, using a combination of federal and state funds.

=== United Kingdom ===
In England sewerage and sewage disposal is undertaken by relatively few large private companies, including several multi-national companies. In Wales and Scotland a "not for profit" company is the responsible body, however in Wales almost all the operational work is sub-contracted by others. Charges to domestic users are based either on the metered volume of incoming water or on the notional value of the property (rateable basis).

== See also ==
- Public utility
- Urban Waste Water Treatment Directive
- Water pollution
