= State revolving fund =

Diagram explaining the use of state revolving funds

A state revolving fund (SRF) is a fund administered by a U.S. state for the purpose of providing low-interest loans for investments in water and sanitation infrastructure (e.g., sewage treatment, stormwater management facilities, drinking water treatment), as well as for the implementation of nonpoint source pollution control and estuary protection projects. An SRF receives its initial capital from federal grants and state contributions. It then emits bonds that are guaranteed by the initial capital. It then "revolves" through the repayment of principal and the payment of interest on outstanding loans.

== Current programs ==
There are currently two SRFs, the Clean Water State Revolving Fund created in 1987 under the Clean Water Act, and the Drinking Water State Revolving Fund created in 1997 under the Safe Drinking Water Act. Both programs are managed at the federal level by the Environmental Protection Agency (EPA).

== Drinking Water State Revolving Fund background ==
Prior to the creation of the Drinking Water State Revolving Fund program, EPA evaluated the adequacy of state public water systems during its early implementation of the 1974 Safe Drinking Water Act. The agency’s goal was to devolve "primacy" (i.e. oversight of local public water systems) to states that were prepared to accept the responsibility and to use the new funds provided by Congress in EPA’s budget to give states financial support.

== See also ==
- Water pollution
- Water purification
- Water supply and sanitation in the United States
