= Water Environment Federation =

The Water Environment Federation (WEF) is a not-for-profit technical and educational organization of more than 34,000 individual members and 75 Member Associations (MAs) representing water quality professionals around the world. WEF, which was formerly known as the Federation of Sewage Works Associations and later as the Water Pollution Control Federation, and originated in 1928. WEF members include experts and specialists in the fields of:

- environmental engineering
- industrial wastewater treatment
- sewage treatment and sewage sludge treatment
- stormwater management
- water quality analysis and planning

and related disciplines.

WEF is headquartered in Alexandria, Virginia, United States.

== Publications and Conferences ==
In addition to books, technical reports, and conferences proceedings, WEF publishes the peer-reviewed journal, Water Environment Research, and the magazine, Water Environment Technology. WEF sponsors local and national speciality meetings, as well as the world's largest annual water conference: WEFTEC - Water Environment Federation Technical Exposition and Conference.

== Awards ==
To recognize individuals and groups in a number of areas, WEF sponsors awards in the categories of: Published Papers; Operational and Design Excellence; Education; Individual Service and Contribution; Fellows; Organization and Association Recognition; National Municipal Stormwater and Green Infrastructure, as well as Committee Chair Service Appreciation.

== See also ==
- National Association of Clean Water Agencies (NACWA) - U.S. local government sewage treatment agencies
- Water supply and sanitation in the United States
