= Bottled water in the United States =

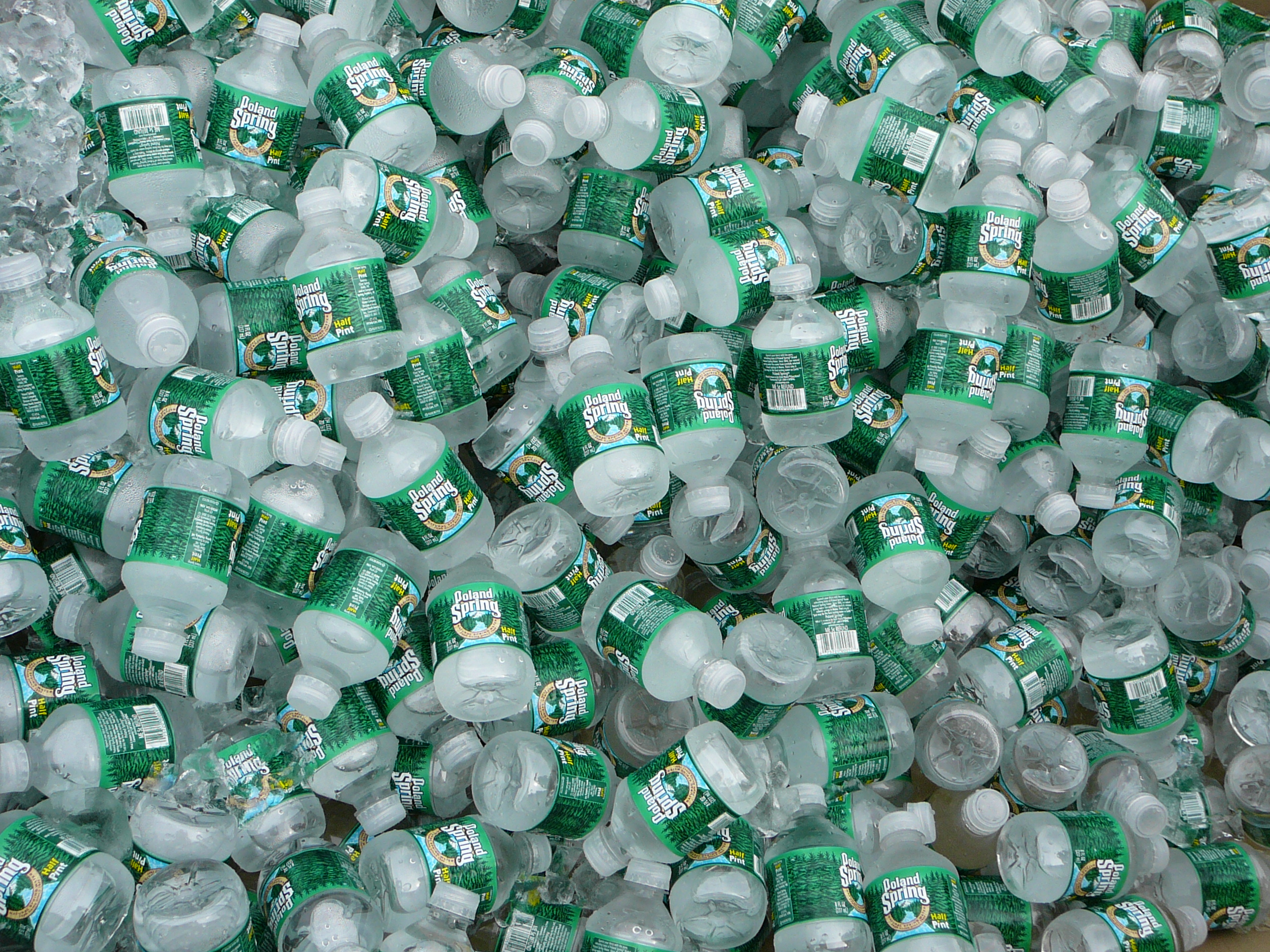
A large pile of Poland Spring bottles

The United States is the largest consumer market for bottled water in the world, followed by Mexico, China, and Brazil.

In 1975, Americans rarely drank bottled water—just one gallon of bottled water per person per year on average. By 2005, it had grown to ~26 gallons (98.5 L) per person per year.

In 2008, U.S. bottled water sales topped 8.6 billion US gallons (33,000,000 m^{3}) for 28.9% of the U.S. liquid refreshment beverage market, exceeding sales of all other beverages except carbonated soft drinks, followed by fruit juices and sports drinks. By 2011, this number had risen to 9.1 billion gallons. In 2017, single-serve water sales totaled $24.1 billion. Americans drink 21 US gallons (79 L) of bottled water per capita per year. From 1970 (16 brands) over 1998 (50 brands) to 2012 (195 brands), the number of mineral water brands in the U.S. has grown exponentially.

== Sources ==
About 25% of U.S. bottled water sold is purified municipal water according to a four-year study by the Natural Resources Defense Council (NRDC). Both Aquafina from PepsiCo and Dasani from The Coca-Cola Company originate from municipal water systems. However, according to the FDA, about 75 percent of bottled water sold in the U.S. comes from other sources, including "natural underground sources, which include rivers, lakes, springs and artesian wells." Federal regulations also require that the standard of identity be noted on the bottle label.

== Marketing strategies ==
Water, which is a free resource, has become a commodity due to bottled water selling. The images in bottled water ads are usually filled with natural landscapes and words like “pure,” “pristine,” and “natural” which help promote a positive image of bottled water. The marketing strategies used for bottled water are very important because they help drive the market and promote the idea that bottled water is better than tap water. There are waters marketed towards athletes, children, and even the “special needs of women.” Many brands for children's water advertise blue bottles for boys and pink bottles for girls. They even go as far as making specific water for pets.

Not only are water bottle brands marketed specifically for certain groups of people, but they also make health claims. Several brands now say they add in “nutraceuticals” along with vitamins and minerals. Companies are also selling water with nicotine, aspirin, and caffeine in them.

== Regulation ==
Bottled water is regulated by the Food & Drug Administration according to standards of identity, standards of quality and good manufacturing practices.

There is one person in charge of regulating bottled water across the country. Between 60% and 70% of all bottled water is produced in state lines and the FDA can only regulate interstate commerce. Therefore 60% to 70% of bottled water goes completely unregulated in the United States.

Standards of identity define types of water for labeling purposes:

- To be called ground water, the water must not be under the direct influence of surface water.
- Water containing more than 250 parts per million of total dissolved solids is mineral water.
- Artesian water comes from a well tapping a confined aquifer in which the water level stands at some height above the top of the aquifer; it may be collected with the assistance of external force to enhance the natural underground pressure.
- Water that has been produced by distillation, deionization, reverse osmosis or similar processes is purified or demineralized water.
- Sparkling water contains the same amount of carbon dioxide that it had at emergence from the source, although it may be removed and replenished in treatment.
- Spring water must be derived from an underground formation from which water flows naturally to the Earth's surface.
- Sterile water meets the requirements under "sterility tests" in the United States Pharmacopoeia.
- Well water is water that has been removed from a hole bored or drilled in the ground which taps into an aquifer.

Standards of quality regulate acceptable levels of the water's turbidity, color and odor, according to sample analysis. Exemptions are made according to aesthetically based allowable levels, and do not relate to health concerns. For example, mineral water is exempt from allowable color levels.

== See also ==
- List of bottled water brands
- Drinking water quality in the United States
- Drinking water supply and sanitation in the United States
- Water privatization in the United States
