= National Association of Clean Water Agencies =

- Abbreviation: NACWA
- Founded: 1970; 56 years ago
- Tax ID no.: 23-7088488
- Legal status: 501(c)(6) nonprofit organization
- Headquarters: Washington, D.C., U.S.
- Coordinates: 38.906245°N 77.042378°W
- Region served: United States
- Members: 463 (2025)
- President: William J. “Mickey” Conway
- Chief Executive Officer: Adam Krantz
- Revenue: $6,159,362 (2016)
- Expenses: $5,762,037 (2016)
- Employees: 26 (2015)
- Website: www.nacwa.org
- Formerly called: Association of Metropolitan Sewerage Agencies

National Association of Clean Water Agencies (NACWA) represents the interests of publicly owned treatment works and related sewerage collection systems, and stormwater management agencies before the United States Congress, several Federal agencies, and in the courts. NACWA advocates for federal funding for clean water agencies and for responsible national policies that advance clean water and a healthy environment.

== History ==
The Association of Metropolitan Sewerage Agencies (AMSA) was established in 1970 to advocate for clean water programs across the United States, with a focus on improving municipal sewage treatment facilities. The establishment coincided with increased interest in Congress on addressing major national water pollution problems. Congress began holding hearings about water pollution during the 1960s and drafted legislation, led by Sen. Edmund Muskie (D-Maine) among others, that led to the passage of the 1972 Federal Water Pollution Control Act Amendments, commonly known as the "Clean Water Act (CWA)." During this period, 22 of the largest municipal wastewater treatment plants across the United States came together over concerns about the need for federal funding to implement the legislation at the local level, and established AMSA.

The U.S. Environmental Protection Agency (EPA) and AMSA worked together, along with state environmental agencies, to implement the newly-established Construction Grants program under CWA Title II.

AMSA worked closely with Congress on the 1977 Clean Water Act Amendments, securing $26 billion for municipal clean water construction grants. "These were local government people, and they were truly doing the basic job of cleaning up the rivers and lakes in their jurisdiction. Their primary impetus resulted from the obligations of local governments to protect the health of their citizens".

As the organization expanded its mission to include broader environmental policy goals for clean water, AMSA changed its name to National Association of Clean Water Agencies (NACWA) in 2005. "NACWA’s core values were expanded from supporting and advocating for the clean water sector at the federal level to the much broader charge of influencing environmental policy and stewardship through sound science, fiscal wisdom, and more stakeholder engagement."

NACWA has participated actively in over four decades of federal legislative and regulatory activity related to clean water. It is now involved in environmental laws and regulations covering a variety of ecosystem issues including watershed management, nonpoint source pollution control, and the protection of air quality. NACWA works closely with members of Congress, Presidential administrations and EPA.

As of 2025 NACWA comprises 463 member agencies and organizations, including municipal utility agencies, corporate affiliates, legal affiliates and other organizations.

== Notable Campaigns ==
NACWA represents clean water agencies in Congress, to the EPA, and in the courts, advocating for increased funding, developing enforceable controls on nonpoint sources, working to improve the total maximum daily load (TMDL) program, addressing stormwater management, and related issues. NACWA also provides technical information and advocacy-focused publications on clean water topics. In addition to various publications including newsletters, white papers, and reports, the organization annually hosts five major conferences on various technical, policy, and utility management issues across the United States and sponsors web seminars on key issues.
