= Point Loma Wastewater Treatment Plant =

Wastewater treatment plant in Point Loma, San Diego County, California

Coordinates: 32°40′45″N 117°14′49″W

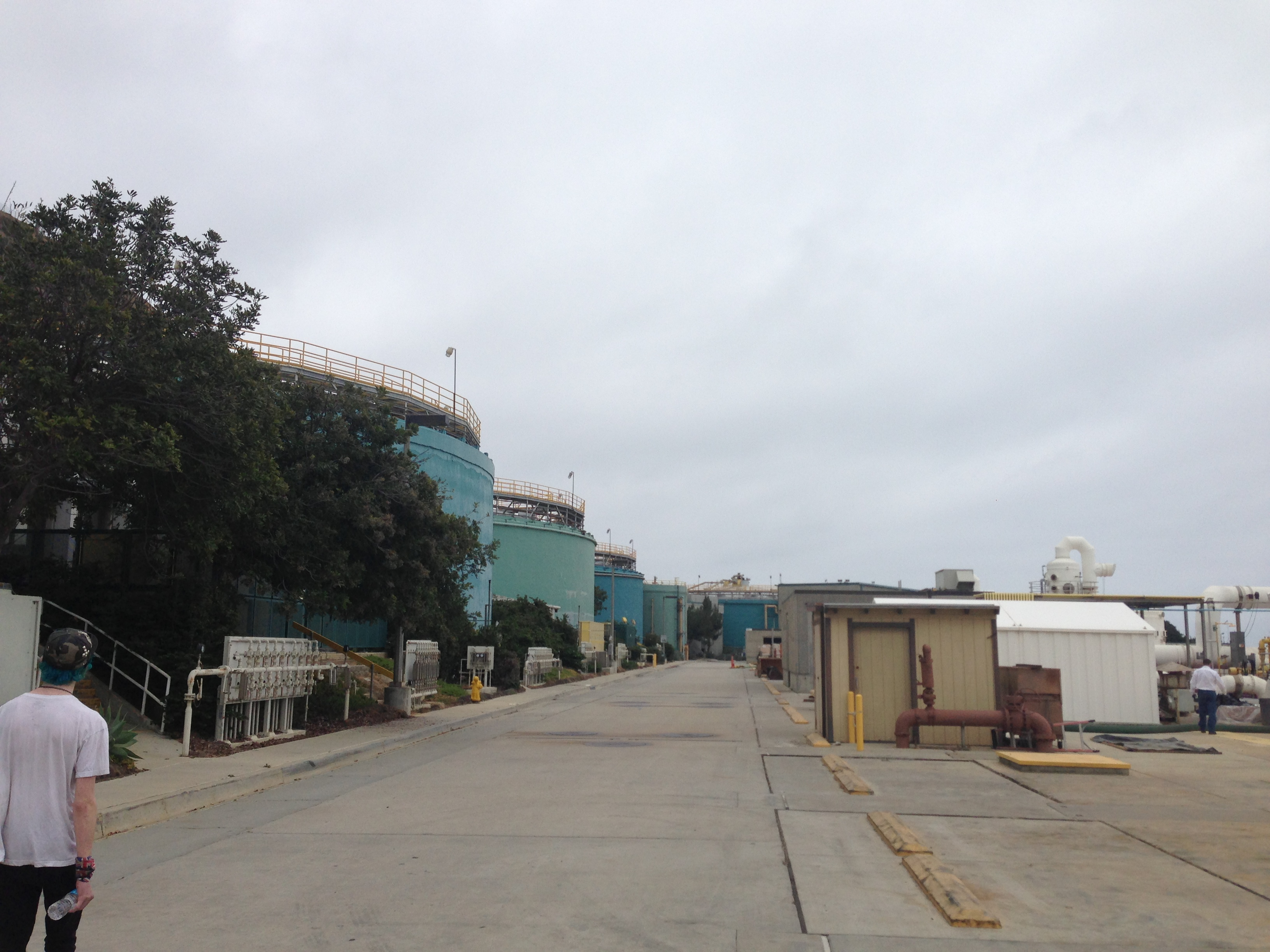
A view of the digesters at Point Loma Wastewater Treatment Plant

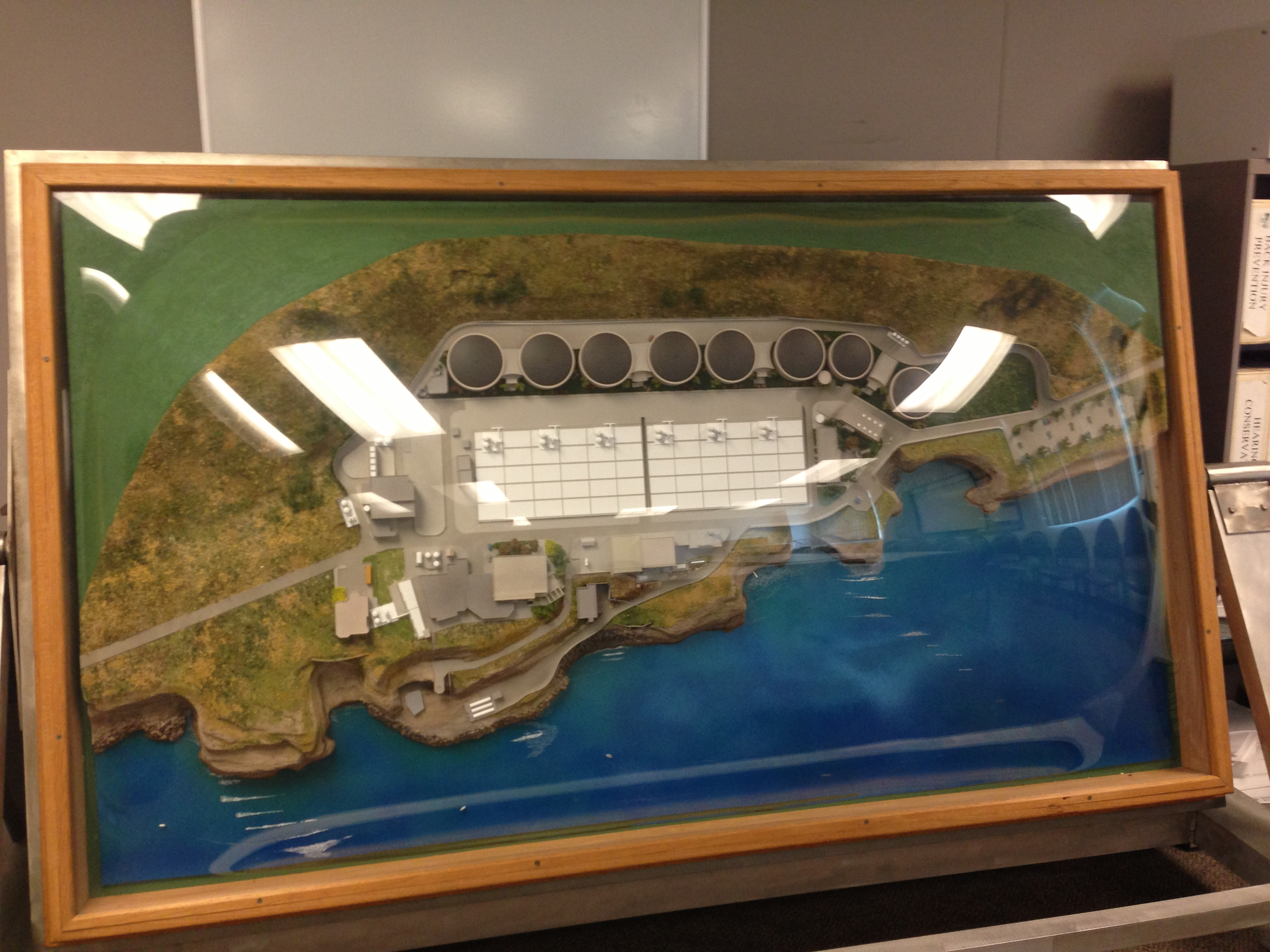
A diorama of the grounds of the Point Loma Wastewater Treatment Plant

The Point Loma Wastewater Treatment Plant is a primary waste water treatment facility located on the Point Loma peninsula in San Diego, California. It is a notable facility due to its ability to treat 1 gallon of waste water for 1/3000th of a penny. The process used to treat the waste water has been perfected to treat a large amount of water as inexpensive as possible. This waste water facility is also noted for its high percentage of removal of pollutants while also remaining a primary treatment facility. The solid removal rate is between 88–90% while the BOD (Biological Oxygen Demand) removal rate is kept at 60%. This unique process involves adding Hydrogen Peroxide in order to retrieve and recycle the iron salts that are used in treatment, thus enabling major cost savings.

== History and background ==
Prior to the opening of the waste water plant, around 1963, the waste in San Diego was carried through interconnected wooden boxes. These boxes transported the water to the San Diego River and then on to the ocean. In 1943, the 32nd Street treatment plant was opened, and in 1948, the capacity of this plant was increased to 40 million gallons per day (MGD). A few years later, San Diego Bay was quarantined due to illness and in 1959 the city council approved the metro-sewage system and the Point Loma Wastewater Treatment Plant. The facility was opened in 1963 and began treating 61 million gallons of water per day. In recent years, there have been many changes to legislation regarding the treatment of waste water such as implementing a spill reduction program. In 2013, the plant celebrated its 50th anniversary.

== Treatment Process and Disposal ==
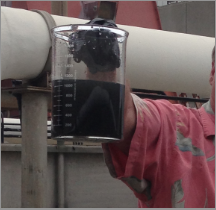
A sample of influent (entering) water at the plant

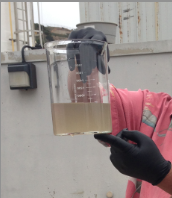
Effluent (exiting) water, after treatment

There are nine major and 84 smaller pump stations in San Diego, these pumps collect water from the surrounding 450 square mile area. The plant treats on average, 145 million gallons per day; however, if needed the plant can process 240 MGD when at maximum capacity. The treated waste water is then delivered back into the ocean by an outfall (pipe) that dumps the water 4.5 miles out from the coast. The waste water is gravity-fed throughout the plant.

To begin the treatment of the water, a sample is first taken from the water in order to measure its strength. This is accomplished by measuring the biological oxygen demand of the water. This water is then sent through a series of screens that rake out large solids such as wood and plastic.

Next, Iron (III) Chloride is added to the water in order to induce a positive chemical charge on the solid particles. Air bubbles are also added to break the surface tension to allow for the inorganic materials settle out.

After that, an anionic polymer is added which attracts the positively charged solid particles and allows these two substances coagulate and settle out. The fats, oils, and greases are also captured before the water is sent to the digesters.

The water in the digesters is heated to 98.6 degrees F, in anaerobic conditions. This heating produces about 900 million cubic feet of methane each day that is captured to produce energy. This methane production completely powers the plant through the process of co-generation.

The plant employs two methods to help control the odor that is also produced by all the methane. These two methods are called wet scrubbing, and carbon polishing. The solids that are produced in the digesters is then pushed through the main sludge pumps and is dumped 17.5 miles away in Kearny Mesa where it is stored and centrifuged. This final solid product is used in landfills to digest organic material and can help add an extra third of a lifetime to landfills.
