= Water Quality Association =

U.S. trade association

- Founded: 1974
- Type: Trade association
- Chief Executive Officer: Pauli Undesser
- Website: www.wqa.org

The Water Quality Association (WQA) is an Illinois-based trade association representing the residential, commercial, industrial, and small community water treatment industry in the United States. It has more than 2,500 members consisting of both manufacturers as well as dealers/distributors of equipment.

The Water Quality Association was founded in 1974 from the merger of two trade associations, the Water Conditioning Association International which represented water treatment dealers and the Water Conditioning Foundation which primarily comprised water treatment equipment manufactures.

WQA represents the water treatment industry as a whole devoted to treating water for both residential and commercial/industrial use.

Water Quality Research Foundation
The Water Quality Research Foundation (WQRF) – formerly the Water Quality Research Council (WQRC), was formed in 1949 as a division of WQA to serve on behalf of the Water Quality Association as a universally recognized and independent research organization. The primary goal of the WQRF is to conduct and fund scientific research and education for the water quality improvement industry. The WQRF currently sponsors numerous research studies which positively impact legislative change.

Gold Seal Program
The Water Quality Association's Gold Seal Product Certification Program is accredited by the American National Standards Institute (ANSI) and Standards Council of Canada (SCC) to test and certify products for conformance with industry standards, including those published by NSF International.

WQA Education
WQA also provides education through the Professional Certification Program, which is accepted as a standard for water treatment professionals. Which include the Certified Water-treatment Representative (CWR) and Certified Water Specialist (CWS), with an Advanced Level certification; Master Water Specialist (MWS).

Sustainability Program
WQA's Sustainability Certification Program is the only ANSI accredited environmental certification program in the drinking water industry. The Sustainability Certification Mark helps retailers and consumers recognize products that have been manufactured according to industry standards for recognized best practices in environmental sustainability and corporate social responsibility. It helps show that the product is safe for both people and Earth.
