= Publicly owned treatment works =

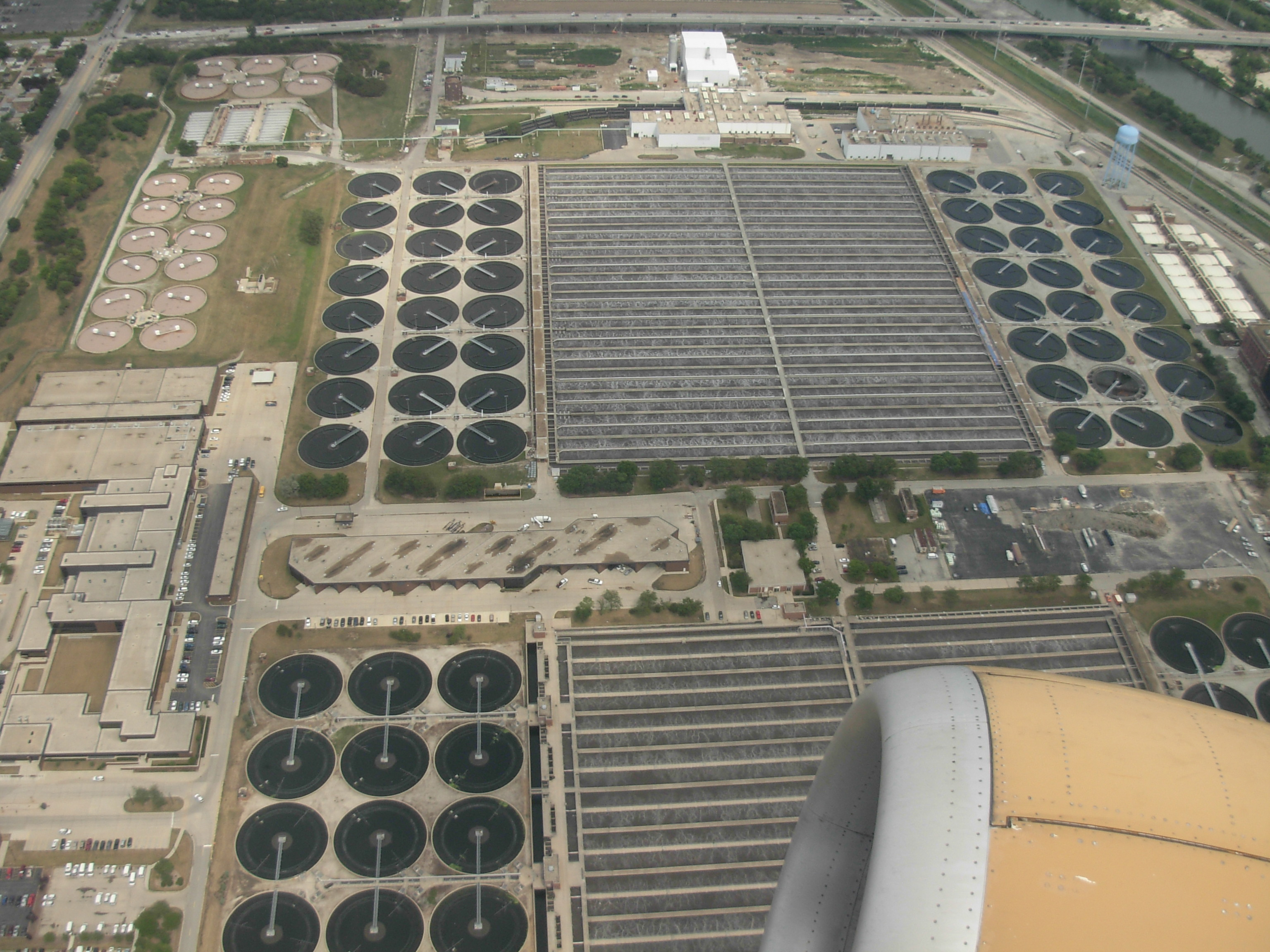
The Stickney Water Reclamation Plant, serving metropolitan Chicago, is the largest sewage treatment plant in the world.

A publicly owned treatment works (POTW) is a term used in the United States for a sewage treatment plant owned, and usually operated, by a government agency. In the U.S., POTWs are typically owned by local government agencies, and are usually designed to treat domestic sewage and not industrial wastewater.

The term is used extensively in U.S. water pollution law (i.e. the Clean Water Act), regulations and programs. Many POTWs were established or expanded with grants or low-interest loans from the U.S. Environmental Protection Agency (EPA).

There are over 16,000 POTWs in the U.S., serving 75 percent of the total population. The remainder of the population is served by decentralized or private septic systems. The POTWs treat 32 billion US gallons (120 gigalitres) of wastewater every day. Most POTWs are required to meet national secondary treatment standards.

== See also ==
- Category:Sewage treatment plants in the United States
- Clean Water State Revolving Fund (financial assistance for POTWs)
- Water pollution
- Water supply and sanitation in the United States
