= Clean Water State Revolving Fund =

USEPA lending program for water quality

Clean Water State Revolving Fund (CSWRF)
- Clean Water State Revolving Fund

- Commercial?: no
- Type of project: environmental financing
- Products: funds
- Location: United States of America
- Country: United States of America
- Ministry: Environmental Protection Agency
- Launched: 1 January 1988; 38 years ago United States of America
- Budget: $2.5 billion (FY 2025)
- Status: active
- Website: epa.gov/cwsrf

The Clean Water State Revolving Fund (CWSRF) is a self-perpetuating loan assistance authority for water quality improvement projects in the United States. The fund is administered by the Environmental Protection Agency and state agencies. The CWSRF, which replaced the Clean Water Act Construction Grants program, provides loans for the construction of municipal wastewater facilities and implementation of nonpoint source pollution control and estuary protection projects. Congress established the fund in the Water Quality Act of 1987. Since inception, cumulative assistance has surpassed 153.6 billion dollars as of 2021, and is continuing to grow through interest earnings, principal repayments, and leveraging.

== Revolving structure ==
An SRF Functions Like an Infrastructure Bank

All 50 states, plus Puerto Rico operate a CWSRF. The 51 CWSRF programs function like environmental infrastructure banks by distributing low interest rate loans for water quality projects. Loan repayments are recycled back into individual CWSRF programs. States can only use the funds to make loans, purchase local debt, or issue financial guarantees. They cannot make grants or otherwise dissipate the capital in their funds. Principal repayments plus interest earnings become available to finance new projects, allowing the funds to "revolve" over time. States can also increase their CWSRF financing capacity by issuing CWSRF-backed revenue or general obligation bonds. As of 2007, 27 states have leveraged their programs in this way, raising an additional $20.6 billion for important water quality projects.

The 51 funds are capitalized in part by federal and state contributions. For every dollar contributed by the federal government, states contribute 20 cents. As of 2017, the cumulative federal appropriation to the 51 CWSRF programs had reached over $42 billion, with corresponding state contributions of $84 billion. Financial leveraging techniques conducted by state funds had snowballed federal and state contributions into $153 billion in 2021.

States are responsible for the operation of their CWSRF program. Under the CWSRF, states may provide various types of assistance, including loans, refinancing, purchasing, or guaranteeing local debt and purchasing bond insurance. States may also set specific loan terms, including interest rates from zero percent to market rate and repayment periods of up to 30 years. States have the flexibility to target financial resources to their specific community and environmental needs.

States may customize loan terms to meet the needs of small and disadvantaged communities, or to provide incentives for certain types of projects. Beginning in 2009, Congress authorized the CWSRFs to provide further financial assistance through additional subsidization, such as grants, principal forgiveness, and negative interest rate loans. Through the Green Project Reserve, the CWSRFs target critical green infrastructure, water and energy efficiency improvements, and other environmentally innovative activities.

== Highlights ==
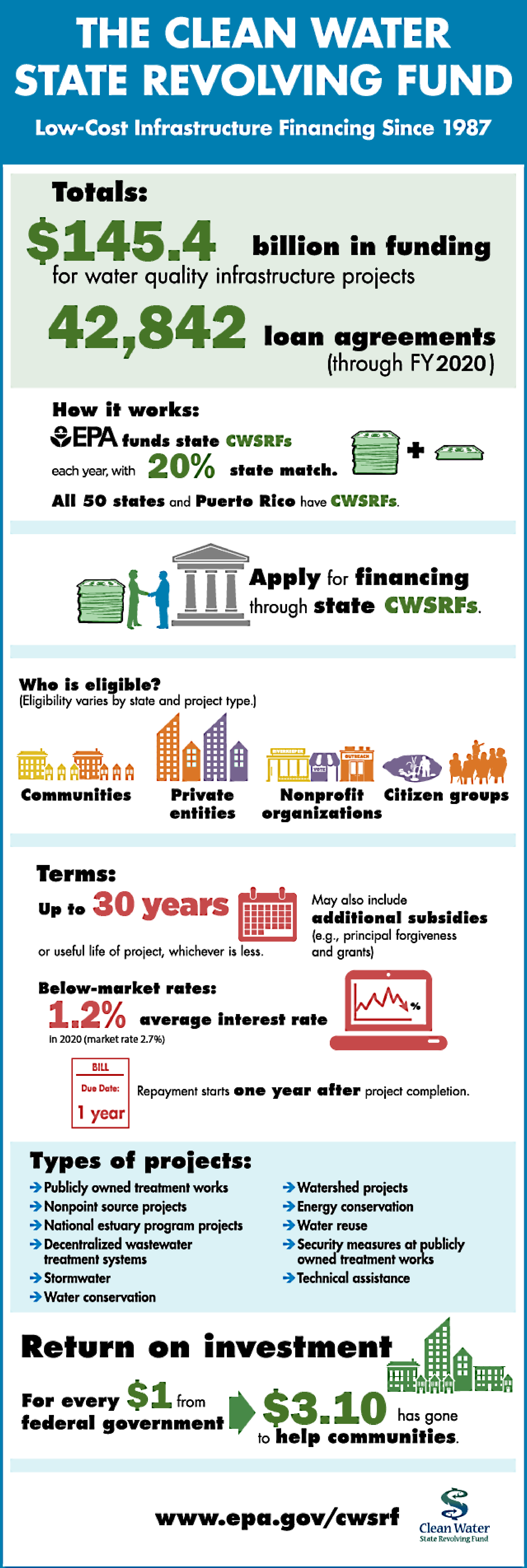
Overview of CWSRF program statistics as of 2020

Since the inaugural CWSRF project was funded in 1988, the 51 state-run CWSRF programs have provided over $145 billion in assistance for water quality projects through 38,441 loans. In 2017, the programs provided over $7.4 billion in assistance to loan recipients of all sizes, including farmers, homeowners, small businesses, nonprofit organizations, and major municipalities. In 2017 the average loan interest rate was 1.4%, compared to the prevailing market rate of 3.5%.

While wastewater treatment projects have comprised 96 percent of all CWSRF funding to date, over $4.6 billion has gone to nonpoint source and estuary projects. The number of assistance agreements for nonpoint source projects has grown significantly over the years, from only two projects in 1990 to 1,305 in 2007. The low cost and flexibility of CWSRF financing has helped the programs serve communities of all sizes. In 2007, two-thirds of all loans went to communities with populations below 3,500. In addition, over $1.1 billion in assistance targeted communities with fewer than 10,000 people (see Figure 3).

The programs are projected to continue to grow over time, as interest earnings and repayments of loans increase (see Figure 4). Nationally, the CWSRF program provides a remarkable return on federal investment: as of 2017, the program has financed $3 in projects for every dollar the federal government has invested.

The demand for CWSRF funds nationwide can be attributed to high needs, low interest rates, and flexible financing options. The rate of fund utilization has increased steadily since 1988, signaling increased demand for funds as well as efficient state operations. As of 2007, 97 percent of all available funds were committed to projects. To meet high levels of demand, 27 states have chosen to implement leveraging approaches by issuing revenue and general obligation bonds that are secured by CWSRF assets. Through leveraging, states have increased their capacity to finance important water quality projects.

=== Leverage ===
27 CWSRF's leverage their funds to increase the amount of capital available for loan assistance. This means that these states augment their CWSRF capital by issuing municipal bonds. Typically, they loan the proceeds of the bonds while investing their capitalization funds (both state and federal). These investments serve two purposes. First, they are pledged to the bondholders as additional collateral, thus more than assuring a AAA bond rating. Second, the interest on the invested capital is used to pay subsidies to the CWSRF program's local utility borrowers.

=== Benefits reporting system ===
The CWSRF Benefits Reporting (CBR) system, launched in 2005 and adopted by all 51 state programs, produces a quantifiable record of the environmental and public health impact of CWSRF investments. Figures 6 and 8 present data reported in the CBR System to date. CBR allows users to record anticipated water quality improvements from every CWSRF loan directed towards water quality improvement. The 51 state programs have used CBR to track the environmental impact of 4,878 projects. The data link $15.8 billion in CWSRF loans to projects that protect and restore drinking water sources, recreational areas, and aquatic wildlife throughout the country. In 2007, CWSRF programs funded more than 964 projects designed to protect and restore water bodies, including 597 projects with direct human health benefits.

== Statutory authority ==
Clean Water Act sections 212, 319, and 320 provide the statutory authority for programs funded by the CWSRF. The CWSRF is authorized to provide financial assistance for the construction of publicly owned treatment works (sec. 212), the development and execution of state's comprehensive conservation management plans (sec. 319), and the development and execution of an estuary conservation and management plan (sec. 320).

=== Eligibility ===
Eligible projects under CWA section 212 include the capital costs for the construction and maintenance of publicly owned treatment works (POTWs).

- Wastewater collection and treatment
- Publicly owned municipal stormwater projects
- Combined sewer overflow
- Sanitary sewer overflow
- Water pipes, storage, and treatment systems
- Green infrastructure
- Water quality portions of municipal landfill projects
- Water conservation and reuse
- Energy Conservation and Efficiency.

Eligible projects under CWA section 319 (nonpoint source projects) may include:

- Agricultural runoff
- Leaking on-site septic systems
- Stormwater runoff
- Brownfield contamination
- Atmospheric deposition
- Runoff from closed landfills
- Leaking underground storage tanks.

CWA section 320 (estuary management) allows the CWSRF to fund publicly and privately owned projects, as long as the project is part of the state's Comprehensive Conservation Management Plan (CCMP) and is sanctioned in the plan.

- Planting trees and shrubs within the watershed (drainage basin)
- Purchasing equipment required for the CCMP
- Environmental clean-up
- Development and initial delivery of educational programs.

Projects must have a direct benefit to the water quality of an estuary. This includes:

- Protection of public water supplies
- Protection and propagation of a balanced, indigenous population of shellfish, fish, and wildlife
- Actions that, in order to allow for recreational activities in and on water, require the control of point and nonpoint sources of pollution to supplement existing controls of pollution.

In many cases, estuary level protection plans are combined with other elements of an overall project. Where the water quality portion of a project is clearly distinct from other portions of the project, only the water quality portion can be funded by the CWSRF.

=== Eligible use of funds ===
The CWSRF employs a variety of loan assistance mechanisms.

Loans

- Terms may not exceed 20 years.
- Interest rates must be at or below market rate including interest-free.

Purchase of debt or refinance

- A community's debt may be purchased by an SRF program.
- Under the Extended Term Finance Policy, the purchase may have terms greater than 20 years, up to the useful life of the project.
- Targeted to disadvantaged communities, though a waiver of the restriction may be granted.
- An SRF program may refinance previously issued debt.

Guarantees and insurances

- Guarantees or insurance can be used where such assistance will result in improved credit market access or reduced interest rates.
- The SRF program does not disburse funds for construction; such funds are procured by a borrower in the market.

Guarantee SRF revenue debt

- Section 603(d)(3) of the Act authorizes CWSRF's to guaranty debt. Guaranty powers increase the funding capacity of CWSRF's as well as decrease annual payments which utility ratepayers must pay for their wastewater projects. Guaranties work very much like municipal bond insurance.
- SRF programs may issue debt guaranteed by SRF funds.
- The revenue generated is used to provide assistance to borrowers for eligible projects.
- This greatly expands the capacity of a program in the near-term.

Provide loan guarantees

- Similar revolving funds established by municipalities or inter-municipal agencies can receive loan guarantees.

Additional Subsidization

- Under certain conditions, CWSRF programs may provide up to a fixed percentage of their capitalization grants as additional subsidization in the form of principal forgiveness, negative interest rate loans, or grants.
- The recipient must be a municipality or inter-municipal, interstate, or state agency.
- Additional subsidization may only be used to help address affordability issues or to implement a process, material, technique, or technology that addresses water or energy efficiency goals; mitigates stormwater runoff; or encourages sustainable project planning, design, and construction.

Earn Interest

- CWSRFs may invest available funds in short-term investments.
- All interest earnings must remain in the fund to be used for eligible purposes.

== Return on federal dollar ==
Due to the income stream into the program from state match, loan repayments, interest earnings, investment earning, and bond proceeds from leveraging, the return on every federal dollar investment to the CWSRF is currently $3 as of 2017.

EPA has projected that over a twenty-year time horizon, the initial federal investment into the CWSRF can result in the construction of up to three to four times as many projects compared to programs that utilize a one-time federal grant, depending on the allocation of resources to the program.

== Addressing climate change ==
Climate change threatens both water quality and water quantity. The CWSRF can assist water utilities and municipalities mitigate the effects of climate change as they relate to water quality by capitalizing costs related to planning and implementing new technologies. Eligible criteria include the following.

=== Energy conservation ===
Wastewater and stormwater treatment facilities consume energy to collect and distribute treated water. The CWSRF can fund capital costs needed to power these publicly owned treatment works (POTWs) and strongly encourages the implementation of energy efficient technology.

- Energy efficient pumps
- Clean energy technology (e.g., solar, wind, hydroelectric, geothermal)
- Purchase of energy audits that have a reasonable prospect of resulting in a capital project
- Pro-rata share of capital costs for off-site publicly owned clean energy facilities that provides power to POTWs.

=== Green infrastructure ===
The CWSRF can fund the "capital costs" of green infrastructure projects with direct water quality benefits. Capital costs include traditional infrastructure expenditures (such as pipes, pumps and treatment plants), as well as unconventional infrastructure costs (like land conservation, tree plantings, equipment purchases, planning and design, environmental cleanups and even the development and initial delivery of environmental education programs). One of the few things the CWSRF cannot fund is the operation and maintenance costs of a project.

The Water Infrastructure Finance and Innovation Act of 2014 established additional financing mechanisms and includes eligibility for green infrastructure projects.

=== Carbon sequestration ===
The CWSRF can finance carbon sequestration through a variety of methods, including urban heat-island reduction, energy saving achievement, and habitat preservation. Aquatic environments, green spaces, and geologic carbon storage are efficient carbon sinks that can be utilized with CWSRF loans.

- Wetlands restoration
- Land conservation (purchase of easements and preserved green spaces)
- Tree plantings (reforestation, green roofs, tree boxes, parks, vegetated swales and median strips)
- CO_{2} scrubbers on power plants that provide energy to POTWs.

=== Methane capture ===
- Publicly owned equipment for the capture of methane emitted from an anaerobic municipal wastewater treatment system and conversion to energy is eligible for CWSRF funding.
- Methane capture equipment can be privately owned if the project is located within a designated National Estuary.
- Public or privately owned equipment to capture methane emitted from manure-containing ponds on animal feeding operations (AFOs), not regulated as concentrated animal feeding operations (CAFOs), and convert the methane to energy is eligible for CWSRF funding.
- This equipment can be located at CAFOs in designated National Estuaries.

== Water conservation and reuse ==
Eligible water conservation and reuse projects include:

- Efficient plumbing fixture retrofits or replacement
- Grey water recycling in public buildings
- Efficient landscape irrigation equipment for public facilities
- Publicly owned stormwater treatment and reuse
- Publicly owned wastewater distribution lines to support effluent reuse/recycling uses, including piping the effluent to the property line of a privately owned effluent consumer, as well as publicly owned equipment to reuse effluent
- Water quality trading for construction projects that generate water pollution control credits or capital projects that may be located offsite the POTW
- Replacing inefficient irrigation practices with efficient drip irrigation.

== Public-private partnerships ==
Public-private partnerships, or "P3s", are one investment technique by which municipalities can finance the upgrade, expansion, repair, or implementation of new technology for wastewater infrastructure. The CWSRF, because of its unique financing authorities, is authorized to oversee (in concert with the EPA's Assistant Administrator for Water), provide technical assistance, and guidance for municipalities that choose to investigate P3s for the provision of their wastewater services.

A P3, as defined by the Environmental Financial Advisory Board, is a contractual, institutional, or other relationship between government and a private sector entity that results in sharing of duties, risks, and rewards of providing a service in which the government has an interest, recognizing that the government retains ultimate responsibility for insuring that social needs and objectives are met.

P3s are sought by states and local governments as a way to reduce the financial burden of water pollution and infrastructure needs. It has been estimated that, of the costly capital improvements, upgrades, expansions, and new compliance requirements imposed on water and wastewater utilities, local governments bear 95% of the costs. Among local government expenditures, only education is higher.

== Water Infrastructure Finance and Innovation Act ==
Congress passed the Water Infrastructure Finance and Innovation Act of 2014 (WIFIA) to provide an expanded credit program for water and wastewater infrastructure projects, with broader eligibility criteria than the previously authorized revolving funds for wastewater and drinking water. Pursuant to the act, EPA established its Water Infrastructure and Resiliency Finance Center in 2015 to help local governments and municipal utilities design innovative financing mechanisms, including public-private partnerships. Congress amended the WIFIA program in 2015 and 2016.

== See also ==
- America's Water Infrastructure Act of 2018
- Drinking Water State Revolving Fund
- Sewerage
- Water supply and sanitation in the United States
- Water pollution
