= Drinking water quality legislation of the United States =

In the United States, public drinking water is governed by the laws and regulations enacted by the federal and state governments. Certain ordinances may also be created at a more local level. The Safe Drinking Water Act (SDWA) is the principal federal law. The SDWA authorizes the United States Environmental Protection Agency (EPA) to create and enforce regulations to achieve the SDWA goals.

== Federal requirements ==
The Safe Drinking Water Act is the principal federal law governing public water systems. These systems provide drinking water through pipes or other constructed conveyances to at least 15 service connections, or serve an average of at least 25 people for at least 60 days a year. As of 2017 there are over 151,000 public water systems.

- Approximately 52,000 Community Water Systems serve the majority of the U.S. population
- Approximately 85,000 systems are non-transient, non-community water systems (such as schools, factories, office buildings, and hospitals that operate their own systems)
- Approximately 18,000 systems are transient, non-community water systems (such as rural gas stations or campgrounds).

Eight percent of the Community Water Systems—large municipal water systems—provide water to 82 percent of the US population.

The SDWA authorized the EPA to promulgate regulations regarding water supply. The major regulations are in Title 40 of the Code of Federal Regulations: 40 CFR Parts 141, 142, and 143. Parts 141, 142, and 143 regulate primary contaminants, implementation by states, and secondary contaminants. Primary contaminants are those with health impacts. State implementation allows states to be the primary regulators of the water supplies (rather than EPA) provided they meet certain requirements. Secondary contaminants generally cause aesthetic problems and are not directly harmful.

The SDWA also contains provisions that require water supplies to develop emergency plans, water supply operators to be licensed, and watersheds to be protected. The Act does not cover private wells.

=== National Primary Drinking Water Regulations ===
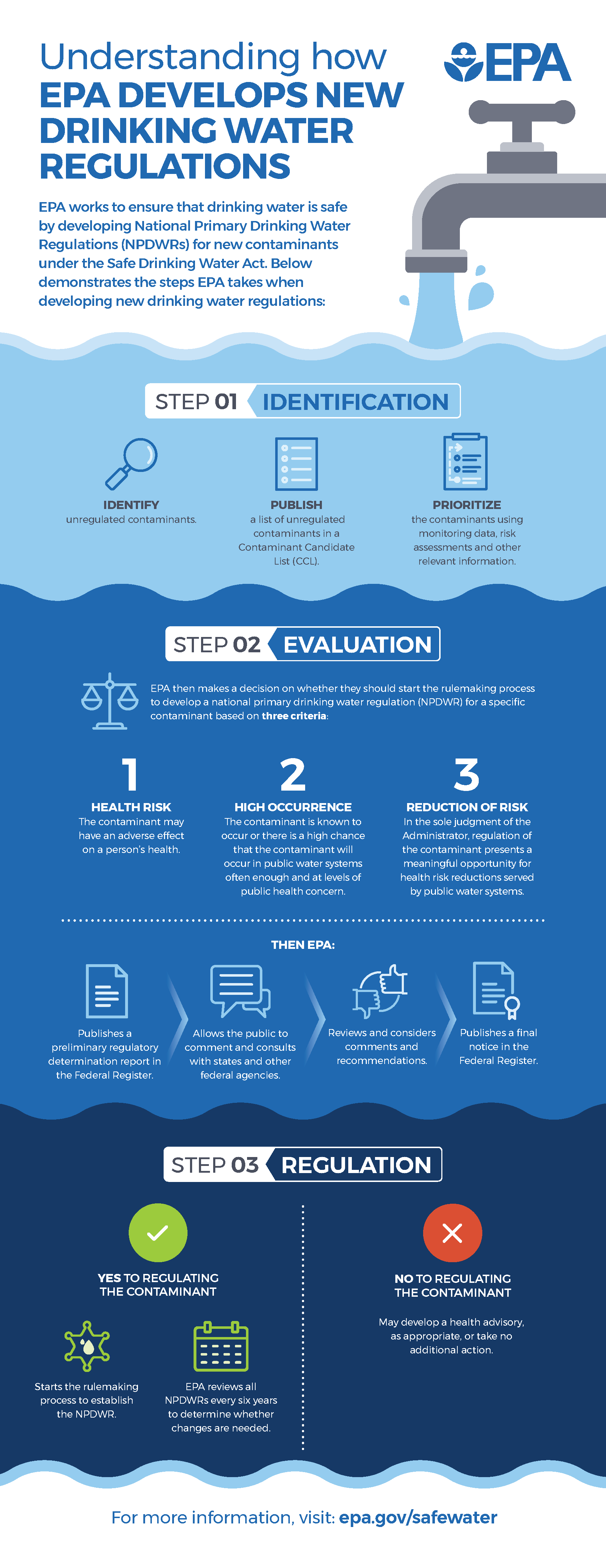
EPA chart explaining the SDWA regulation development process

==== Types of water systems ====
Part 141 regulates public water systems based on size (population served) and type of water consumers. Larger water systems and water systems serving year-round residents (cities) have more requirements than smaller water systems or those serving different people each day (e.g., a shopping mall). In 2009, public water systems on commercial airlines were included.

==== Control of contaminants ====
The drinking water standards are organized into six classes of contaminants: Microorganisms, Disinfectants, Disinfection Byproducts, Inorganic Chemicals, Organic Chemicals and Radionuclides. The standards specify either Maximum Contaminant Levels (MCLs) or Treatment Techniques (enforceable procedures).

The most recent major standard-setting rules include:

- Ground Water Rule (2006)
- Long Term 2 Enhanced Surface Water Treatment Rule (2006) for control of Cryptosporidium and other pathogens.
- Stage 2 Disinfectants and Disinfection Byproducts Rule (2006)
- Lead and Copper Rule (last revised 2021).

==== Monitoring and reporting ====
Testing is required to determine compliance with maximum contaminant levels. The regulations specify when and how samples are to be taken and analyzed. For example:

- The Information Collection Rule required large public water systems to collect samples in the late 1990s to provide data for designing new regulations or revising regulations related to pathogen contamination in surface water and disinfection byproduct production.
- The Unregulated Contaminant Monitoring Rules require certain water systems to test for contaminants which do not yet have drinking water limits. The resulting information is used to prioritize the regulation of new contaminants. Section 141.40 includes the latest list of proposed contaminants. In 2012, the third set of contaminants (UCMR3) replaced the previous set (UCMR2).

The regulations specify who must be notified and the manner of the notification. One such provision is Subpart O, Consumer Confidence Reports. These reports are a summary of the water supplies sources and water quality testing results. The reports must be sent to all customers annually. Subpart Q regulates how violations must be reported.

=== National Primary Drinking Water Regulations implementation ===
EPA issued the implementation regulations in Part 142 pursuant to the Public Health Service Act and the SDWA. Oversight of public water systems is managed by "primacy" agencies, which are either state government agencies, Indian tribes or EPA regional offices. All state and territories, except Wyoming and the District of Columbia, have received primacy approval from EPA, to supervise the PWS in their respective jurisdictions. Generally, a primacy agency must incorporate the requirements of the National Primary Drinking Water Regulations in its own regulations. States may be more stringent, but not less stringent, than the federal rules. Federal funding is available to primacy agencies that implement or enforce some or all of the federal requirements.

=== National Secondary Drinking Water Regulations ===
The relatively short Secondary Regulations at Part 143 provide guidance for aesthetic characteristics, including taste, color, and odor, but do not actually regulate public water systems. "The regulations are not Federally enforceable but are intended as guidelines for the States." Although not federally enforceable, some states regulate the secondary contaminants.

The guidelines include recommendations for maximum concentrations for 15 contaminants, when to sample, and how to analyze the samples. Some contaminants in the Secondary Regulations are also regulated in the Primary Regulations. This generally occurs when a contaminant is a nuisance at a low level, but toxic at a higher concentration.

=== Compliance ===
Municipalities throughout the United States, from the largest cities to the smallest towns, sometimes fail to meet EPA standards. The EPA may fine the jurisdiction responsible for the violation, but this does not always motivate the municipality to take corrective action. In such cases, non-compliance with EPA may continue for many months or years after the initial violation. This could result from the fact that the city simply doesn't have the financial resources necessary to replace aging water pipes or upgrade their purification equipment. In rare cases, the source water used by the municipality could be so polluted that water purification processes can't do an adequate job. This can occur when a town is downstream from a large sewage treatment plant or large-scale agricultural operations. Citizens who live in such places—especially young children, the elderly, or people of any age with autoimmune deficiencies—may suffer serious health complications as a long-term result of drinking water from their own taps.

== State requirements ==
Some state and local governments have issued rules to protect users of private wells.

=== California ===
Timeline of existing federal water and state drinking water quality regulations:

- National Interim Primary Drinking Water Regulations (NIPDWR)
  - Promulgated 1975-1981
  - Contained 7 contaminants
  - Targeted: trihalomethanes, arsenic, and radionuclides
  - Established 22 drinking water standards
- Phase 1 standards
  - Promulgated 1987
  - Contained 8 contaminants
  - Targeted: VOCs
- Phase 2 standards
  - Promulgated 1991
  - Contained 36 contaminants
  - Targeted: VOCs, SOCs, and IOCs
- Phase 5 standards
  - Promulgated 1992
  - Contained 23 contaminants
  - Targeted: VOCs, SOCs, and IOCs
- Surface Water Treatment Rule (SWTR)
  - Promulgated 1989
  - Contained 5 contaminants
  - Targeted: Microbiological and Turbidity
- Stage 1 Disinfectant/Disinfection By-product(D/DBP) Rule
  - Promulgated 1998
  - Contained 14 contaminants
  - Targeted: DBPs and precursors
- Interim Enhanced Surface Water Treatment Rule (IESWTR)
  - Promulgated 1998
  - Contained 2 contaminants
  - Targeted: Microbiological and Turbidity
- Radionuclide Rule
  - Promulgated 2000
  - Contained 4 contaminants
  - Targeted: Radionuclides
- Arsenic Rule
  - Promulgated 2001
  - Contained 1 contaminant
  - Targeted: Arsenic
- Filter Backwash Recycling Rule
  - Promulgated 2001
  - Contained -
  - Targeted: Microbiological and Turbidity

=== New Jersey ===
New Jersey enacted its own Safe Drinking Water Act in 1977. The state statute is closely modeled on the federal act. The Department of Environmental Protection administers the NJSDWA and its related regulations in the state administrative code.

=== New York ===
==== Regulations ====
Public Health Law Section 225 gives the public health council authority to create and modify the State Sanitary Code. Part 5 of the New York State Sanitary Code (10NYCRR5) regulates water supply.

Public water supply regulation in New York predates the Federal Safe Drinking Water Act by decades. As in California, New York has over the years, in accordance with 40CFR142, modified its sanitary code to implement the rules in the federal code.

Occasionally, the Public Health Law is also amended to regulate water supply, e.g. Article 11 of the NY Public Health Law.

The Environmental Conservation Code regulates the sources and districting of water supply.

Other laws that govern the operation of water supply, such as the Transportation Corporation Law, Town Law, and the Public Service Law, affect water quality indirectly.

==== Organization ====
The New York State Department of Health has primacy for most of the water supply regulation compliance determination and enforcement in New York. The department sets general policy and oversees the local units, which may be district offices, regional offices, or county health departments, who oversee the public water systems.

=== Ohio ===
In 2014, algae produced toxins that appear as a product of farmland fertilizers' runoff, became a pressing issue in several Ohio cities. As a result, the state legislators drafted a bill in September, which if passed, will require Ohio Environmental Protection Agency to routinely test for the health-hazardous algae.

== See also ==
- Drinking water quality in the United States
