= Maximum contaminant level =

Measure of drinking water contamination

Maximum contaminant levels (MCLs) are standards that are set by the United States Environmental Protection Agency (EPA) for drinking water quality. An MCL is the legal threshold limit on the amount of a substance that is allowed in public water systems under the Safe Drinking Water Act (SDWA). The limit is usually expressed as a concentration in milligrams or micrograms per liter of water.

== Federal MCL development ==
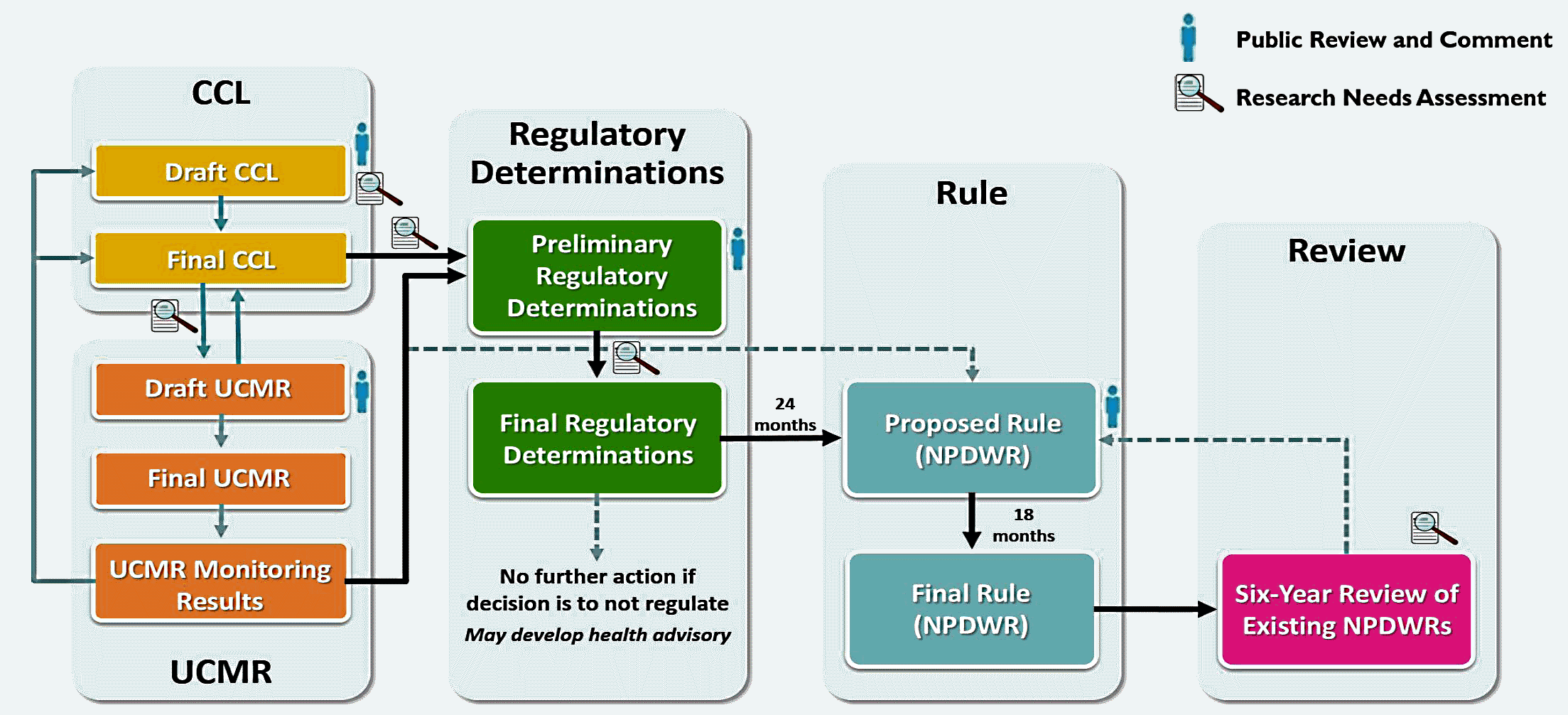
Chart of Regulatory Analysis Processes under the Safe Drinking Water Act

To set a maximum contaminant level for a contaminant, EPA first determines how much of the contaminant may be present with no adverse health effects. This level is called the maximum contaminant level goal (MCLG). MCLGs are non-enforceable public health goals. The legally enforced MCL is then set as close as possible to the MCLG. The MCL for a contaminant may be higher than the MCLG because of difficulties in measuring small quantities of a contaminant, a lack of available treatment technologies, or if EPA determines that the costs of treatment would outweigh the public health benefits of a lower MCL. In the last case, EPA is permitted to choose an MCL that balances the cost of treatment with the public health benefits. MCLs require monitoring, remediation, and public notice when standards are exceeded. As of 2019 EPA has issued 88 standards (78 MCLs and 10 Treatment Techniques) for microorganisms, chemicals and radionuclides.

For some contaminants, EPA establishes a Treatment Technique (TT) instead of an MCL. TTs are enforceable procedures that drinking water systems must follow in treating their water for a contaminant.

MCLs and TTs are known jointly as "National Primary Drinking Water Regulations" (NPDWRs), or primary standards.

Some contaminants may cause aesthetic problems with drinking water, such as the presence of unpleasant tastes or odors, or cosmetic problems, such as tooth discoloration. Since these contaminants do not cause health problems, there are no legally enforceable limits on their presence in drinking water. However, EPA recommends maximum levels of these contaminants in drinking water. These recommendations are called "National Secondary Drinking Water Regulations" (NSDWRs), or secondary standards.

== MCLs issued by states ==
Some state laws and regulations use the term "maximum contaminant level" to refer to MCLs promulgated within a state pursuant either to the federal SDWA or state law; for example, the New Jersey Safe Drinking Water Act. In some cases, a state may issue an MCL for a contaminant that has not been regulated by EPA under federal law. For example, in 2018 New Jersey promulgated an MCL for perfluorononanoic acid (PFNA).

== See also ==
- Drinking water quality in the United States
- Maximum residue limit (standard for pesticides in food)
- Maximum concentration (pharmacology)
