= Lead and Copper Rule =

US drinking water regulation

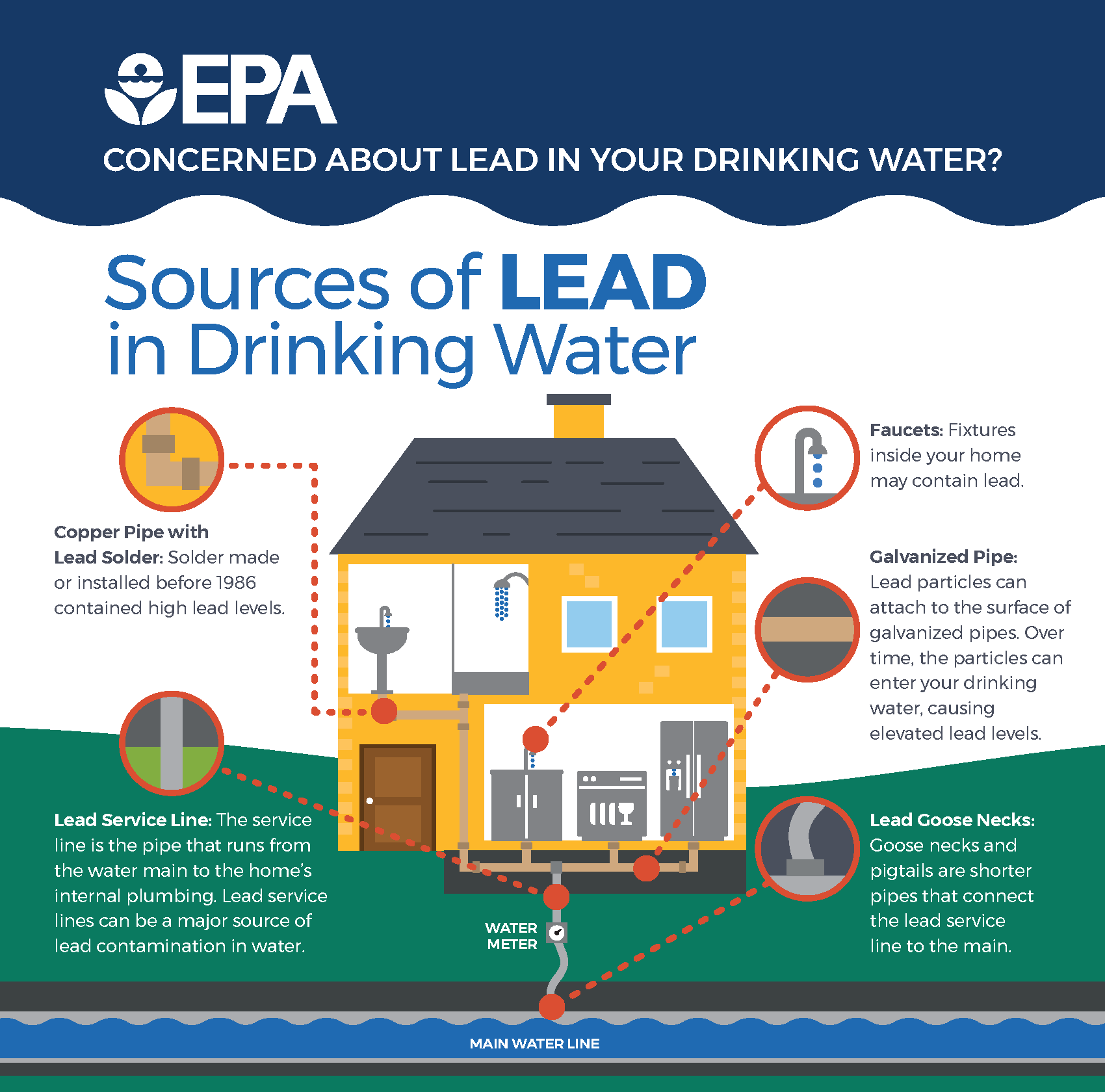
EPA illustration of lead sources in residential buildings

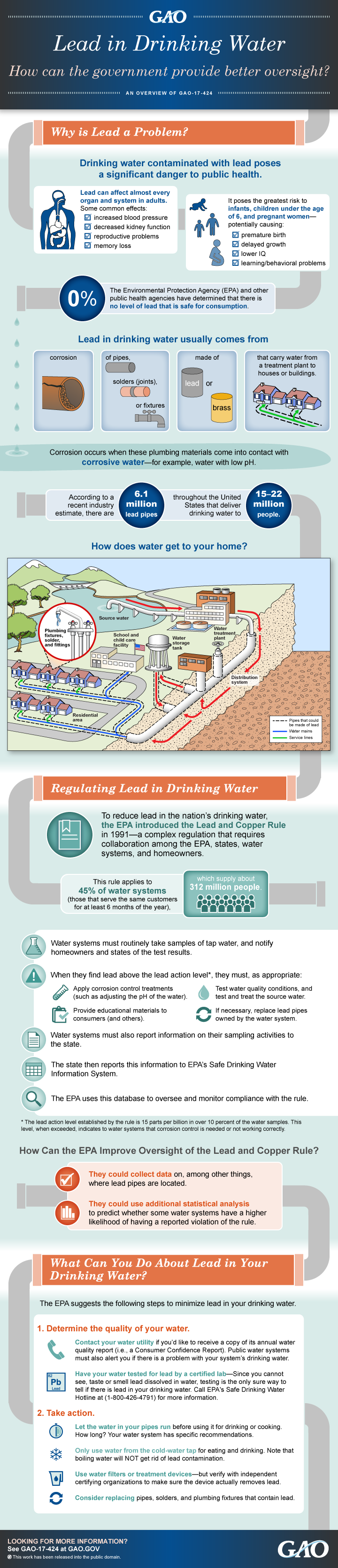
Infographic about lead in drinking water

The Lead and Copper Rule (LCR) is a United States federal regulation that limits the concentration of lead and copper allowed in public drinking water at the consumer's tap, as well as limiting the permissible amount of pipe corrosion occurring due to the water itself. The U.S. Environmental Protection Agency (EPA) first issued the rule in 1991 pursuant to the Safe Drinking Water Act (SDWA). The EPA promulgated the regulations following studies that concluded that copper and lead have an adverse effect on individuals. The LCR limits the levels of these metals in water through improving water treatment centers, determining copper and lead levels for customers who use lead plumbing parts, and eliminating the water source as a source of lead and copper. If the lead and copper levels exceed the "action levels", water suppliers are required to educate their consumers on how to reduce exposure to lead. In a 2005 report EPA stated that the LCR requirements had been effective in 96 percent of systems serving at least 3,300 people.

The EPA has stated that the LCR has reduced exposure to lead "that can cause damage to brain, red blood cells, and kidneys, especially for young children and pregnant women." It also explained that the rule has reduced copper exposure "that can cause stomach and intestinal distress, liver or kidney damage, and complications of Wilson’s disease in genetically predisposed people."

In October 2024 EPA issued its final "Lead and Copper Rule Improvements" regulation, which requires the removal of all lead pipes within ten years.

== Background ==
Although lead is a known poison, the mechanical and chemical characteristics of the metal continue to keep lead as an important component in many products. In water supply, lead's durability and workability made it preferable for use as water pipes (as compared to, for example, iron pipes). Copper alloys (bronze: copper+tin, sometimes trace amounts of aluminum, phosphorus, or lead; brass: copper+zinc, and occasionally lead historically) are used for plumbing fittings, these alloys can sometimes be contaminated with lead, and lead solders were also preferred. While state and local governments began to prohibit installation of lead pipes early in the twentieth century, lead contaminated copper alloys continued to be used. Alternative pipe materials have been iron, copper, and later plastics. Although new lead pipes weren't installed later in the 20th century, some existing lead pipes remain in service in many cities.

The U.S. Public Health Service published a non-enforceable standard for lead in 1925, consisting of a tolerance limit of 0.1 mg/L.

Partially because of the continued use of lead pipes, some states regulated the corrosivity of treated water put into the distribution system. Waters which would deposit a protective coating on the pipes rather than dissolving the pipe were preferred. Corrosion indexes such as pH or Langelier Saturation Index are not necessarily representative of the lead corrosion potential in a particular water/pipe system, nor did they measure the amount of lead to which customers were exposed.

In the second half of the twentieth century, concern was growing about what constituted a safe level of lead. The National Academy of Sciences conducted studies on the toxicity of lead (and other drinking water contaminants) as required by the SDWA. The academy's 1977 report suggested that the drinking water standard for lead in effect at that time may not be sufficiently protective of human health.

The 1986 Safe Drinking Water Act amendments defined "lead-free" plumbing and prohibited the use of plumbing for public water supply that did not meet the new definition. The amendments also required the EPA to set standards limiting the concentration of lead in public water systems. The Reduction of Lead in Drinking Water Act, enacted in 2011, tightened the definition of "lead-free" plumbing fixtures and fittings.

== Adoption ==
EPA first issued the Lead and Copper Rule on June 7, 1991. The rule required public water systems serving more than 50,000 people to survey their corrosion control systems and to obtain state approval for their systems by January 1, 1997. Smaller systems were only required to replace their pipelines if action levels were exceeded in measurements taken at the tap.

EPA published the Lead and Copper Rule Minor Revisions (LCRMR) in January 2000. This rule required water suppliers to install the best available corrosion control mechanisms and to continually observe water levels, even if corrosion control was implemented. The revisions were effective April 11, 2000. Additional corrections and minor revisions were made in 2004 and 2006. A 2007 amendment added new requirements in the areas of monitoring, treatment processes, public education, customer awareness, and lead service line replacement.

To implement the 2011 Reduction of Lead in Drinking Water Act, EPA published a final rule on September 1, 2020.

In response to the Flint, Michigan water crisis (2014), EPA published a final rule on January 15, 2021, addressing testing, pipe replacement and related issues. The rule mandates additional requirements for sampling tap water, corrosion control, public outreach and testing water in schools. The rule continues the requirement for replacement of lead service lines (LSLs) when the action level is exceeded, but requires that a utility replace at least 3 percent of its lines annually, compared to 7 percent under the prior regulation. EPA justified the 3% requirement with the explanation that the new replacement program has fewer loopholes. Under the prior version, water systems were able to "test out" of the LSL replacement program, delay implementation because they did not have LSL inventories, or complete partial replacements and therefore, few water systems ever satisfied the full 7%. Several citizen and environmental groups immediately filed lawsuits challenging the 2021 rule.

EPA issued its final "Lead and Copper Rule Improvements" regulation on October 8, 2024, which requires the removal of all lead pipes within ten years. Additionally, the regulation lowers the action level of lead contamination to 10 ppb from the current limit of 15 ppb, effective in 2027. Funding for lead pipe replacement is available to water utilities through the Infrastructure Investment and Jobs Act, the Water Infrastructure Finance and Innovation Act and the Drinking Water State Revolving Fund. EPA estimated the costs of the rule as $1.5 billion to $2 billion per year, with benefits of $13 billion to $25 billion per year.

== Synopsis ==
Most of the lead found in drinking water leaches from lead service lines, the customer's pipes, fittings, and solder rather than from the source water. As a result, sampling is done from the customer's taps. Although the chemistry is complicated, the lead dissolved in the water generally increases with the amount of time the water has been in contact with the pipe. This is why "first draw" samples must be water which has stood motionless for at least 6 hours.

When samples exceed the LCR's Trigger Level (15 parts per billion for lead and 1.3 parts per million/1130 parts per billion for copper), plumbing systems must be checked annually. When more than 10% of samples exceed the LCR's Action Level (lead Action Level lowered to 10 ppb in 2027), state and municipal governments must check their plumbing systems semi-annually and intervene by investigating, recommending treatments, identifying the source of contamination, removing lead plumbing, and offering public education.

The site selection process prioritizes sites by the likelihood of finding high lead concentrations which could impact people. Building codes and building records may be used to estimate the types of plumbing and solders at various buildings. Residential buildings are preferred over commercial, for sampling. Only taps from which water is consumed are tested. The age of plumbing is taken into account, as older piping may reach an equilibrium with the water.

== Regulatory approach ==
Because the source of lead and copper is generally the customer-owned piping rather than any part of the water supplier's plumbing, equipment, or even the original source of water, the Lead and Copper Rule is quite unlike any of the other provisions of the National Primary Drinking Water Regulations. To some extent, the water supplier is made responsible for the quality of water sampled at pipes and locations completely out of the supplier's control. The most unusual features of the rule follow from this difference.

While maximum contaminant levels (MCLs) are risk-based standards, and the code requires the water supplier take various actions based on MCLs, the Lead and Copper Rule regulates the level of contamination at the customers' taps based on "action levels". The rule does not define an MCL for lead or copper. This approach allows some percentage of the customer taps to exceed the "action level" without the water system having to take action. Especially for the larger public water systems, having the supplier change the tendency of the water to dissolve lead in the customer plumbing may be more cost effective than having thousands of customers replace their plumbing.

Also, because the source of lead and copper is the customer plumbing, lead and copper sampling is specified to be "first draw".

Most other water samples are taken by the water supplier's personnel. Trained personnel using consistent procedures generally yield more reliable data. The first draw sampling procedures make water supplier sampling impractical. Rather than have a technician spend six hours in a customer's home, the water supplier may leave the sample bottles and sampling instructions with the consumer.

== Data collection ==
The EPA was investigated by the Government Accountability Office (GAO) in 2003 following the discovery of higher-than-acceptable copper and lead levels in tap water in the District of Columbia. The GAO reported that the EPA had not been collecting copper and lead levels from the states, despite claims that the levels of copper and lead have decreased; data for 72 percent of water systems were missing. The EPA may have been lacking data because more resources were being dedicated to lead regulation than lead reporting.

== See also ==
- Drinking water quality in the United States
- Lead abatement in the United States
- Lead poisoning – Poisoning caused by lead in the body
