= Drinking water quality in the United States =

Drinking water quality in the United States is generally safe. In 2016, over 90 percent of the nation's community water systems were in compliance with all published U.S. Environmental Protection Agency (US EPA) standards. Over 286 million Americans get their tap water from a community water system. Eight percent of the community water systems—large municipal water systems—provide water to 82 percent of the US population. The Safe Drinking Water Act requires the US EPA to set standards for drinking water quality in public water systems (entities that provide water for human consumption to at least 25 people for at least 60 days a year). Enforcement of the standards is mostly carried out by state health agencies. States may set standards that are more stringent than the federal standards.

Drinking water quality in the U.S. is regulated by state and federal laws and codes, which set maximum contaminant levels (MCLs) and Treatment Technique requirements for some pollutants and naturally occurring constituents, determine various operational requirements, require public notification for violation of standards, provide guidance to state primacy agencies, and require utilities to publish Consumer Confidence Reports.

EPA has set standards for over 90 contaminants organized into six groups: microorganisms, disinfectants, disinfection byproducts, inorganic chemicals, organic chemicals and radionuclides. EPA also identifies and lists unregulated contaminants which may require regulation. The Contaminant Candidate List is published every five years, and EPA is required to decide whether to regulate at least five or more listed contaminants. There are also many chemicals and substances for which there are no regulatory standards applicable to drinking water utilities. EPA operates an ongoing research program to analyze various substances and consider whether additional standards are needed.

Most of the public water systems (PWS) that are out of compliance are small systems in rural areas and small towns. For example, in 2015, 9% of water systems (21 million people) were reported as having water quality violations and therefore were at risk of drinking contaminated water that did not meet water quality standards.

== Background ==
In early US history, drinking water quality in the country was managed by individual drinking water utilities and at the state and local level. In 1914 the U.S. Public Health Service (PHS) published a set of drinking water standards, pursuant to existing federal authority to regulate interstate commerce, and in response to the 1893 Interstate Quarantine Act. As such the standards were directly applicable only to interstate common carriers such as railroads. For local drinking water utilities, these standards were basically recommendations and not enforceable requirements. However, many municipal utilities began to voluntarily adopt the standards.

Ultimately the PHS standards were adopted and expanded as national drinking water standards after passage of the 1974 Safe Drinking Water Act (SDWA), and U.S. water quality became subject to a whole new generation of federal standards.

== Enforcement of standards ==
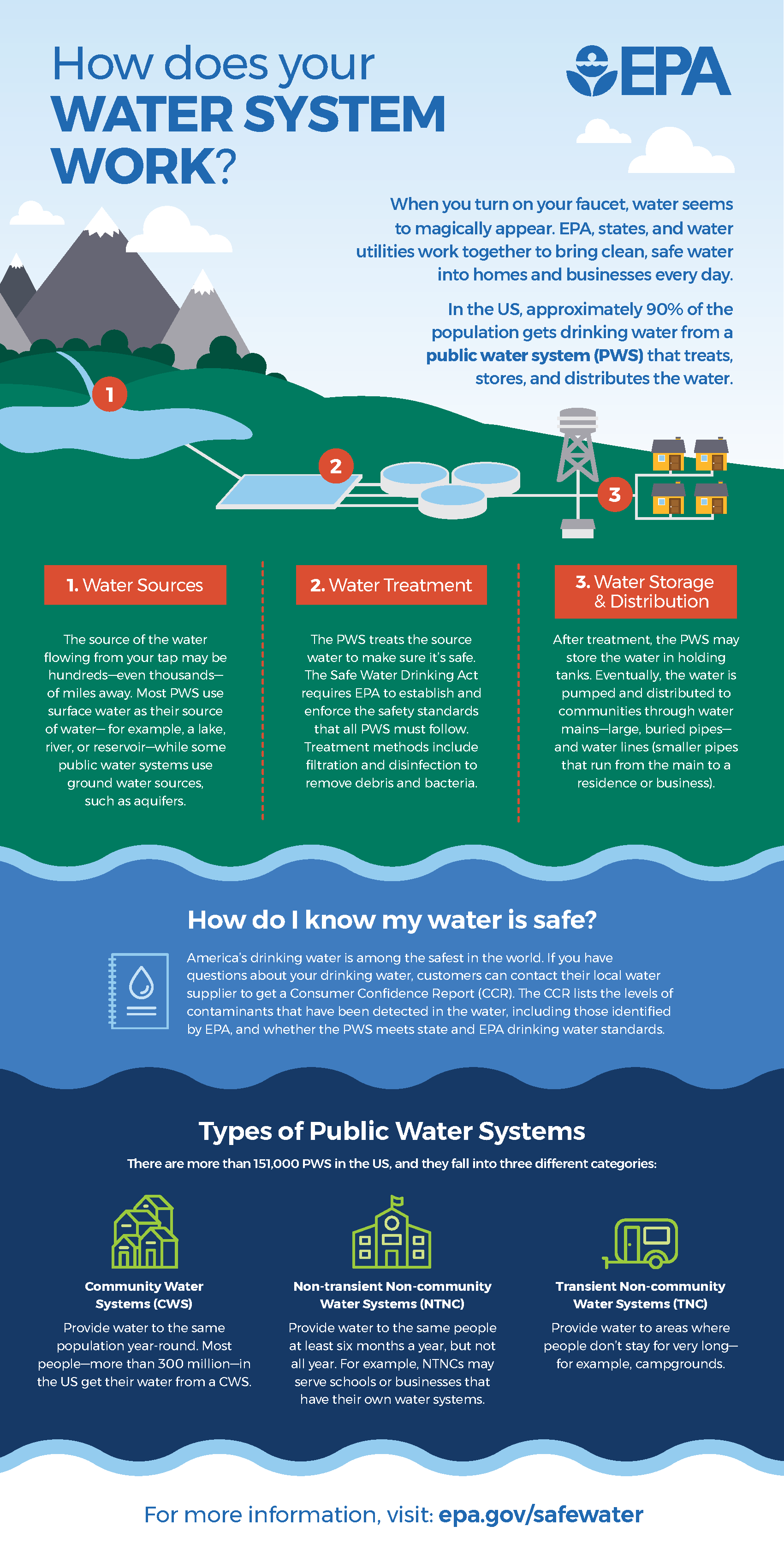
EPA poster explaining public water systems and Consumer Confidence Reports

The SDWA requires EPA to issue federal regulations for public water systems. There are no federal regulations covering private drinking water wells, although some state and local governments have issued rules for these wells. EPA enters into primary enforcement authority (primacy) agreements with state governments, so in most states EPA does not directly enforce the SDWA. State rules can be different from EPA's, but they must be at least as stringent.

EPA defines a public water system (PWS) as an entity that provides water for human consumption to at least 25 people (or at least 15 connections) for at least 60 days a year. There are three types of public water system: community systems (like cities or trailer parks); non-transient, non-community systems (like factories or schools with their own water source); and transient non-community systems (like rural restaurants or camps).

Enforcement of drinking water standards in small water systems is less consistent than enforcement in large systems. As of 2016 more than 3/4ths of small community water systems that were classified as having serious health violations by EPA still had the same violations three years later. Some violations included an overabundance of lead, exceeding allowed rates for nitrate and fecal coliform. Around half of the most contaminated water systems were located in Kansas, Texas and Puerto Rico. EPA's Office of Enforcement and Compliance Assurance noted that the agency faced "a daunting list of challenges" in its continuing efforts, particularly with small systems that "lack the basic infrastructure, resources and capacity to provide clean drinking water."

== Consumer Confidence Reports ==
EPA's Consumer Confidence Rule of 1998 requires community public water suppliers to provide customers with annual reports of drinking water quality, called Consumer Confidence Reports (CCR). Each year by July 1 anyone connected to a public water system should receive in the mail an annual water quality report that tells where your water comes from and what's in it. Consumers can find out about these local reports on a map provided by EPA.

The regulation requires water suppliers to list the water sources, report detected contaminants and the system's compliance with National Primary Drinking Water Regulations in the annual reports. Suppliers may also provide additional information such as explanation of the system's treatment processes, advice on water conservation and information about protecting the community's water sources.

The US Environmental Protection Agency (EPA) regulates the allowable levels of some contaminants in public water systems. There may also be numerous contaminants in tap water that are not regulated by EPA and yet potentially harmful to human health. Community water systems—those systems that serve the same people throughout the year—must provide an annual "Consumer Confidence Report" to customers. The report identifies contaminants, if any, in the water system and explains the potential health impacts.

Several studies show that a Safe Drinking Water Act (SDWA) health violation occurs in around 7-8% of community water system (CWS) in an average year. Around 16 million cases of acute gastroenteritis occur each year in the US, due to the existence of contaminants in drinking water.

== Common drinking water contaminants ==
Studies have shown that there can be more than 80 common contaminants in treated drinking water that may pose a risk to human health. These contaminants fall into two separate categories, acute and chronic effects.

- Acute effects occur within hours or days of the time that a person consumes a contaminant. People can experience acute health effects from almost any contaminant if they are exposed to extraordinarily high levels (as in the case of a spill). In drinking water, microbes, such as bacteria and viruses, are the contaminants with the greatest chance of reaching levels high enough to cause acute health effects. Acute effects contaminants are the most commons type that are found in drinking water. Acute contaminants are usually easy for the human body to fight off and don't normally have long lasting health effects.
- Chronic effects occur after people consume a contaminant at levels over EPA's safety standards over the course of many years. The drinking water contaminants that can have chronic effects include chemicals (such as disinfection byproducts, solvents and pesticides), radionuclides (such as radium), and minerals (such as arsenic). Examples of these chronic effects include cancer, liver or kidney problems, or reproductive difficulties.

Though these chronic contaminants are rare in the US, there are many parts of the world that battle with these chronic contaminants and have to face the possible hazards on a daily basis. A few common water-borne contaminants include aluminum, ammonia, arsenic, barium, cadmium, chloramine, chromium, copper, fluoride, bacteria and viruses, lead, nitrates and nitrites, mercury, perchlorate, radium, selenium, silver, and uranium. Some of these contaminants are easy to detect through human senses, such as smell and taste, and other contaminants are impossible to detect with the human eye. Some of the most dangerous contaminants are consumed without any notice. It is extremely important to know the difference between chemical and biological contaminants. Chemical contaminants are elements or compounds that can either be naturally occurring or man-made. These contaminants usually result in external/internal damages to the body. Biological contaminants are organisms that are found in water these contaminates include viruses and bacteria and are usually fought off by the bodies immune system.

== Substances for which there are federal standards ==
EPA has promulgated over 90 standards for microorganisms, chemicals and radionuclides. The standards are organized into six groups:

- Microorganisms
- Disinfectants
- Disinfection byproducts
- Inorganic chemicals
- Organic chemicals
- Radionuclides.

=== Microorganisms ===
EPA has issued standards for Cryptosporidium, Giardia lamblia, Legionella, coliform bacteria and enteric viruses. EPA also requires two microorganism-related tests to indicate water quality: plate count and turbidity.

==== Cryptosporidium ====
Cryptosporidium is a parasite that has a thick outer shell and thus is highly resistant to disinfection with chlorine. It gets into rivers and lakes from the stools of infected animals. Municipal water treatment plants usually remove Cryptosporidium oocysts through filtration. Nevertheless, at least five outbreaks of cryptosporidiosis in the U.S. have been associated with contaminated drinking water, including a well-publicized one in Milwaukee, Wisconsin in 1993.

The Long Term 2 Enhanced Surface Water Treatment Rule ("LT2 rule") of 2006 requires evaluation of surface water treatment plants and that these plants take specific actions to minimize the potential for Cryptosporidium infections.

=== Disinfectants ===
The EPA has released standards for many chemicals including disinfectants used to treat drinking water under the SDWA. Germs can contaminate water which puts public health at risk including carrying disease causing germs such as Salmonella, Campylobacter, and norovirus. These germs are killed off through a disinfect process that is usually done with chlorine or chloramine. Disinfection with chlorine is called chlorination and disinfection with chloramine is called chloramination. Both of these processes include disinfecting the water by adding the chemicals to it which is meant to destroy any germs or bacteria that came in contact with the water. A PWS may alternate the use of chlorine and chloramine in order to decrease the risk of biofilm in its pipes. Chlorine and chloramine are allowed at a level of up to 4 milligrams per liter (mg/L) or 4 parts per million (ppm) in drinking water. However, federal standards includes antimicrobials and any pesticide products and devices that make antimicrobial claims. Products that make such claims must be registered under the EPA before use and distribution. EPA has issued standards for chlorine, monochloramine, chlorine dioxide, ozone disinfection and ultraviolet germicidal irradiation (UV).

=== Disinfection by-products ===
EPA has issued standards for bromate, chlorite, haloacetic acids and trihalomethanes.

Disinfectants such as chlorine can react with natural material in the water to form disinfection byproducts such as trihalomethanes. Animal studies indicate that none of the chlorination byproducts studied to date is a potent carcinogen at concentrations normally found in drinking water. According to the "GreenFacts" website, there is insufficient epidemiological evidence to conclude that drinking chlorinated water causes cancers. The results of currently published studies do not provide convincing evidence that chlorinated water causes adverse pregnancy outcomes.

A new analysis of recent research from around the world suggests that chlorination of drinking water at levels common in the United States and the European, while a "cheap, effective, and readily available" method for killing organisms and infectious diseases, it has its drawbacks including a 33% increase in the risk of bladder cancer and an 15% increase in the risk of colorectal cancer.

=== Inorganic chemicals ===
EPA has issued standards for antimony, arsenic, asbestos, barium, beryllium, cadmium, chromium, copper, cyanide, fluoride, lead, mercury, nitrate, nitrite, selenium and thallium.

==== Fluoride ====
Most people associate fluoride with the practice of intentionally adding fluoride to public drinking-water supplies for the prevention of tooth decay. However, fluoride can also enter public water systems from natural sources, including runoff from weathering of fluoride-containing rocks and soils and leaching from soil into groundwater. Fluoride pollution from various industrial emissions can also contaminate water supplies. In a few areas of the United States, fluoride concentrations in water are much higher than normal, mostly from natural sources. In 1986, EPA established a maximum allowable concentration for fluoride in drinking water of 4 milligrams per liter (mg/L). After reviewing research on various health effects from exposure to fluoride, the Committee on Fluoride in Drinking Water of the National Research Council concluded in 2006 that EPA's drinking water standard for fluoride does not protect against adverse health effects. Just over 200,000 Americans live in communities where fluoride levels in drinking water are 4 mg/L or higher. Children in those communities are at risk of developing severe tooth enamel fluorosis, a condition that can cause tooth enamel loss and pitting. It can also increase the risk of bone fractures. The report concluded unanimously that the present maximum contaminant level goal of 4 mg/L for fluoride should be lowered.

Several states have more stringent regulations. For example, the fluoride MCL for public water systems in New York (state) is 2.2 mg/L.

==== Lead ====
Lead typically gets into drinking water after the water leaves the treatment plant. The source of lead is most likely pipe or solder in older service connections or older plumbing inside homes, from which lead "leaks" into the water through corrosion. The symptoms of lead poisoning may include abdominal pain, constipation, headaches, ADHD (Attention Deficit Hyperactivity Disorder), irritability, memory problems, inability to have children, and tingling in the hands and feet. It causes almost 10% of intellectual disability of otherwise unknown cause and can result in behavioral problems. Some of the effects are permanent. In severe cases anemia, seizures, coma, or death may occur.

EPA's Lead and Copper Rule (LCR), first published in 1991, defined an "action level" of 15 parts per billion (ppb) for lead, which is different from a maximum contaminant level. Under the 1991 LCR, if tests showed that the level of lead in drinking water was in the area of 15 ppb or higher, it was advisable—especially if there are young children in the home—to replace old pipes, to filter water, or to use bottled water. EPA estimated that more than 40 million U.S. residents use water "that can contain lead in excess of 15 ppb". EPA tightened the lead standard in 2024 (see below).

A typical utility action is to adjust the chemistry of the drinking water with anti-corrosive additives, but replacement of customer pipes is also an option. Most communities have avoided customer pipe replacement due to the high cost. Some water systems have undertaken programs to remove all lead service lines, especially after the publicity surrounding the Flint, Michigan water crisis in 2016. In 2018, NPR reported that about 180 towns were operating removal programs using financing from federal, state, or local taxpayers, other water customers, and charitable donations to provide grants or loans to property owners to cover the cost of removal. This includes systems in Boston (Massachusetts Water Resources Authority), Cincinnati (Greater Cincinnati Water Works), Gary (Indiana American Water), Detroit (Detroit Water and Sewerage Department), and Lansing. Madison, Wisconsin removed all of its lead service pipes over an 11-year period, starting in 2001.

In Washington, DC a pipe replacement program began in 2004 to replace lead service connections to about 35,000 homes. The effectiveness of the program was questioned in 2008 by DC Water, the city's utility. In 2016, more than 5,000 drinking water systems were found to be in violation of the lead and copper rule.

Congress passed the Reduction of Lead in Drinking Water Act in 2011. This amendment to the SDWA, effective in 2014, tightened the definition of "lead-free" plumbing fixtures and fittings. EPA published a final rule implementing the amendment on September 1, 2020.

In response to the Flint water crisis, EPA published revisions to the LCR on January 15, 2021, addressing testing, pipe replacement and related issues. The rule mandates additional requirements for sampling tap water, corrosion control, public outreach and testing water in schools. The rule continues the requirement for replacement of lead service lines when the action level for lead is exceeded, but requires that a utility replace at least 3 percent of its lines annually, compared to 7 percent under the prior regulation. Several citizen and environmental groups immediately filed lawsuits challenging the rule. In response to the lawsuit, EPA issued a final "Lead and Copper Rule Improvements" regulation on October 8, 2024. The updated LCR requires the removal of all lead pipes within ten years. Additionally, the regulation lowers the action level of lead contamination to 10ppb from the current limit of 15ppb.

Other incidents of widespread lead contamination include the Pittsburgh water crisis (started in 2014, discovered in 2016, ongoing in 2018) and the Newark water crisis (in schools, 2016–2019).

In 2021, President Joe Biden's federal $2.3 trillion American Jobs Plan proposed spending $45 billion on lead pipe removal, which is the estimated cost of removing all remaining lead pipes nationwide. Bipartisan negotiations reduced this to $15 billion in the Infrastructure Investment and Jobs Act, which contained only $550 billion in new spending. $11 billion in the bill allocated generally to drinking water infrastructure could also be spent on lead pipe removal.

==== Chromium ====
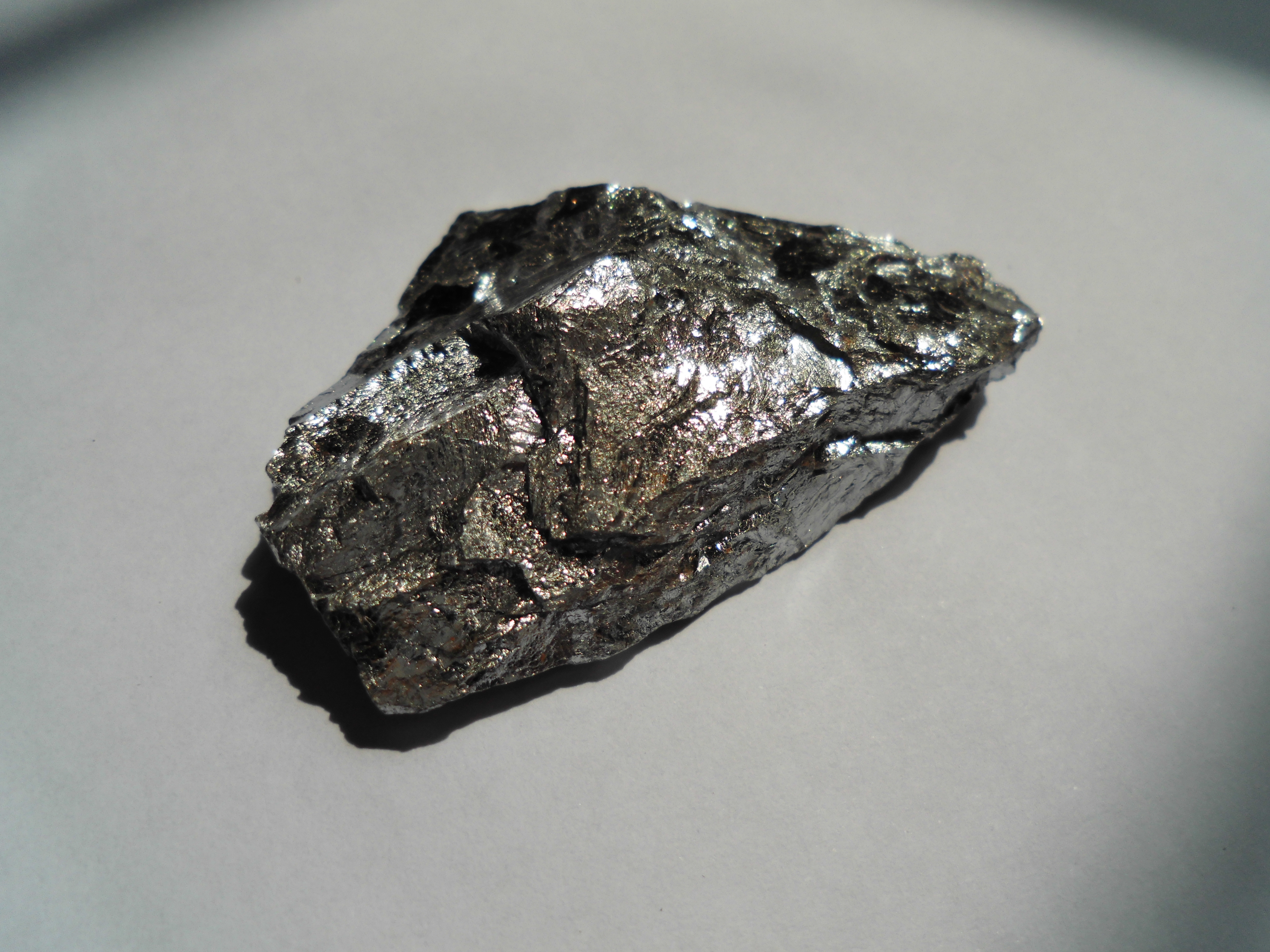
Chromium

EPA published standards in 1991 to ensure that total chromium is limited to 0.1 milligrams per liter or 100 parts per billion in drinking water. It is an odorless and tasteless metal that can be naturally occurring in rocks, plants, soil and volcanic dust, and animals. It can also be introduced to the environment through man made processes such erosion of natural chromium deposits, leakage, poor storage, or inadequate industrial waste disposal practices. In large doses human consumption or exposure can lead to adverse health effects including cancer, eye, stomach, and respiratory tract issues. An example of this chemical causing adverse health issues is through a well-known hexavalent chromium (chromium 6) pollution event in Hinkley, California. Groundwater contamination in Hinkley was caused by water containing hexavalent chromium being dumped on the ground by Pacific Gas and Electric (PG&E) from 1952 to 1966. PG&E used this chemical to deter corrosion in their cooling towers. The use of this chemical in cooling towers lead to a wastewater leakage into unlined ponds at their cooling tower sites. This, in turn, turned into groundwater contamination which adversely affected the town of Hinkley. The contamination resulted in a $333 million settlement in 1996. The clean-up process is ongoing as of 2022, with monthly monitoring reports submitted by PG&E. This case has led to California being the only state in the US to adopt an MCL of 10 ppb specifically for hexavalent chromium instead of relying on an overall total chromium count.

=== Organic chemicals ===
Diagram of pesticide routes into streams and groundwater

EPA has issued standards for over 53 organic compounds, including benzene, dioxin (2,3,7,8-TCDD), PCBs, styrene, toluene, vinyl chloride and several pesticides. The presence of organic chemicals in water can cause an issues for human health and adverse effects on the environment will occur. This is especially because processes such as disinfection by chlorine can cause toxic chemical reactions to occur and leak out into the surrounding area. Some sources of these organic chemicals include pesticides and herbicides, polychlorinatedbyphenlys, industrial/commercial organics, and disinfection by products. Organic chemicals can be characterized in 2 categories: volatile organic compounds (VOCs), and synthetic organic contaminants (SOCs). VOCs and SOCs do not reside naturally in drinking water, and are detected when they are improperly stored or leaked into water systems through contamination.

==== Perfluorinated alkylated substances ====
Per- and polyfluoroalkyl substances (PFAS) are a group of synthetic organofluorine chemical compounds which have been studied extensively due to potential human health concerns. Regulations for some PFAS compounds in public water systems have been published in the 21st century.

Perfluorooctanoic acid (PFOA) is a synthetic perfluorinated carboxylic acid and fluorosurfactant. It has been used in the manufacture of such prominent consumer goods as polytetrafluoroethylene (PTFE; Teflon and similar products). PFOA has been manufactured since the 1940s in industrial quantities. PFOA persists indefinitely in the environment. It is a toxicant and carcinogen in animals. PFOA has been detected in the blood of more than 98% of the general US population in the low and sub-parts per billion (ppb) range, and levels are higher in chemical plant employees and surrounding subpopulations.

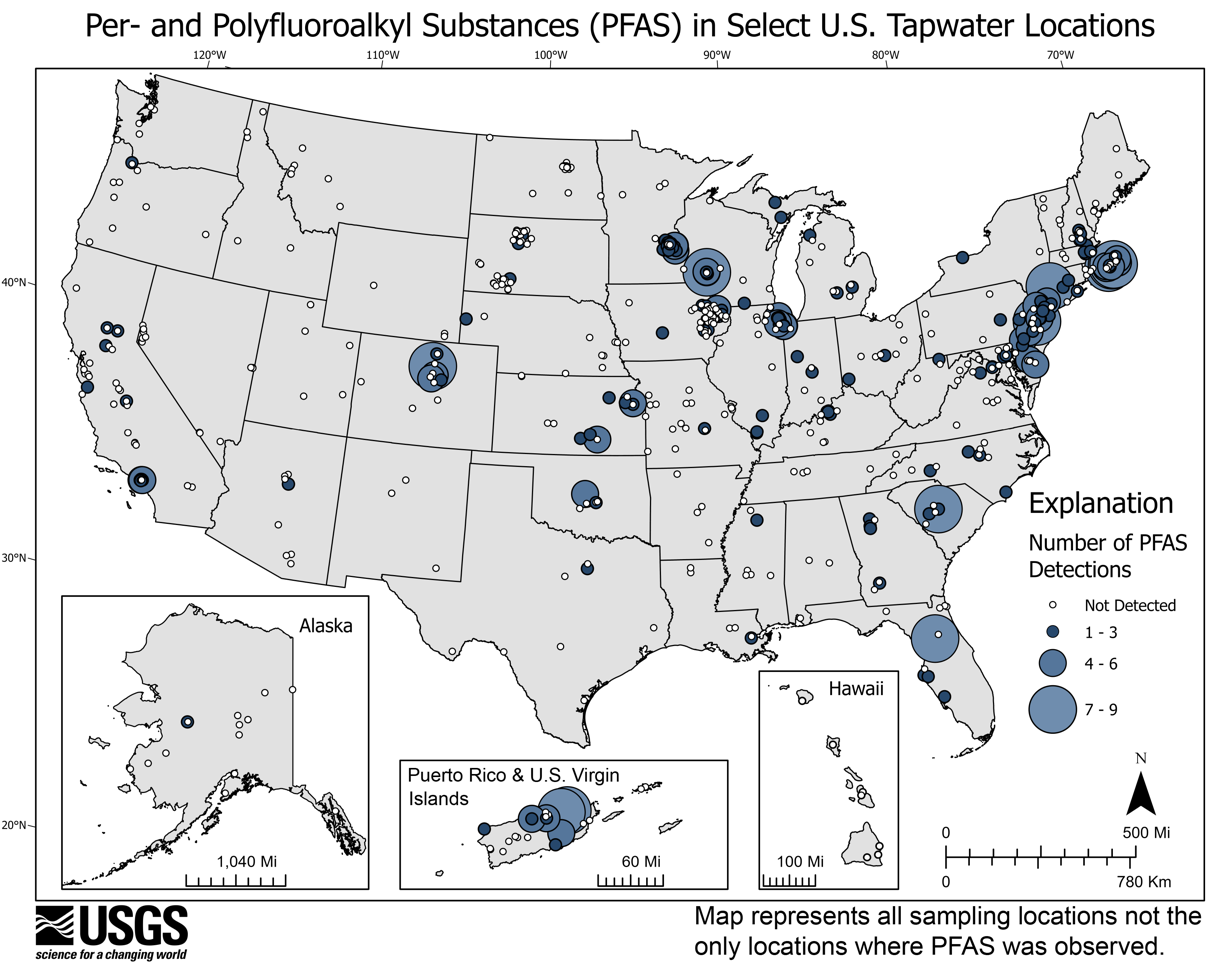
This USGS map shows the number of PFAS detected in tap water samples from select sites across the US.

EPA began requiring public water systems to monitor for PFOA and perfluorooctanesulfonic acid (PFOS) in 2012, and published drinking water health advisories, which are non-regulatory technical documents, in 2016.

In November 2017 the New Jersey Department of Environmental Protection announced plans to develop its own drinking water standards for PFOA. New Jersey published a standard for perfluorononanoic acid (PFNA) in September 2018, the first state to do so. The state set the MCL at 13 parts per trillion (ppt). Other states that have issued PFAS standards include Michigan, New York and Vermont.

Between 2016 and 2021 the U.S. Geological Survey (USGS) tested tap water from 716 locations across the United States, finding PFAS levels exceeding the EPA advisories in approximately 75% of samples from urban areas and in approximately 25% of rural areas.

In April 2024 EPA published final drinking water standards for six PFAS:

- PFOA
- PFOS
- perfluorohexanesulfonic acid (PFHxS)
- PFNA
- hexafluoropropylene oxide dimer acid (also known as GenX)
- perfluorobutanesulfonic acid (PFBS).

=== Radionuclides ===
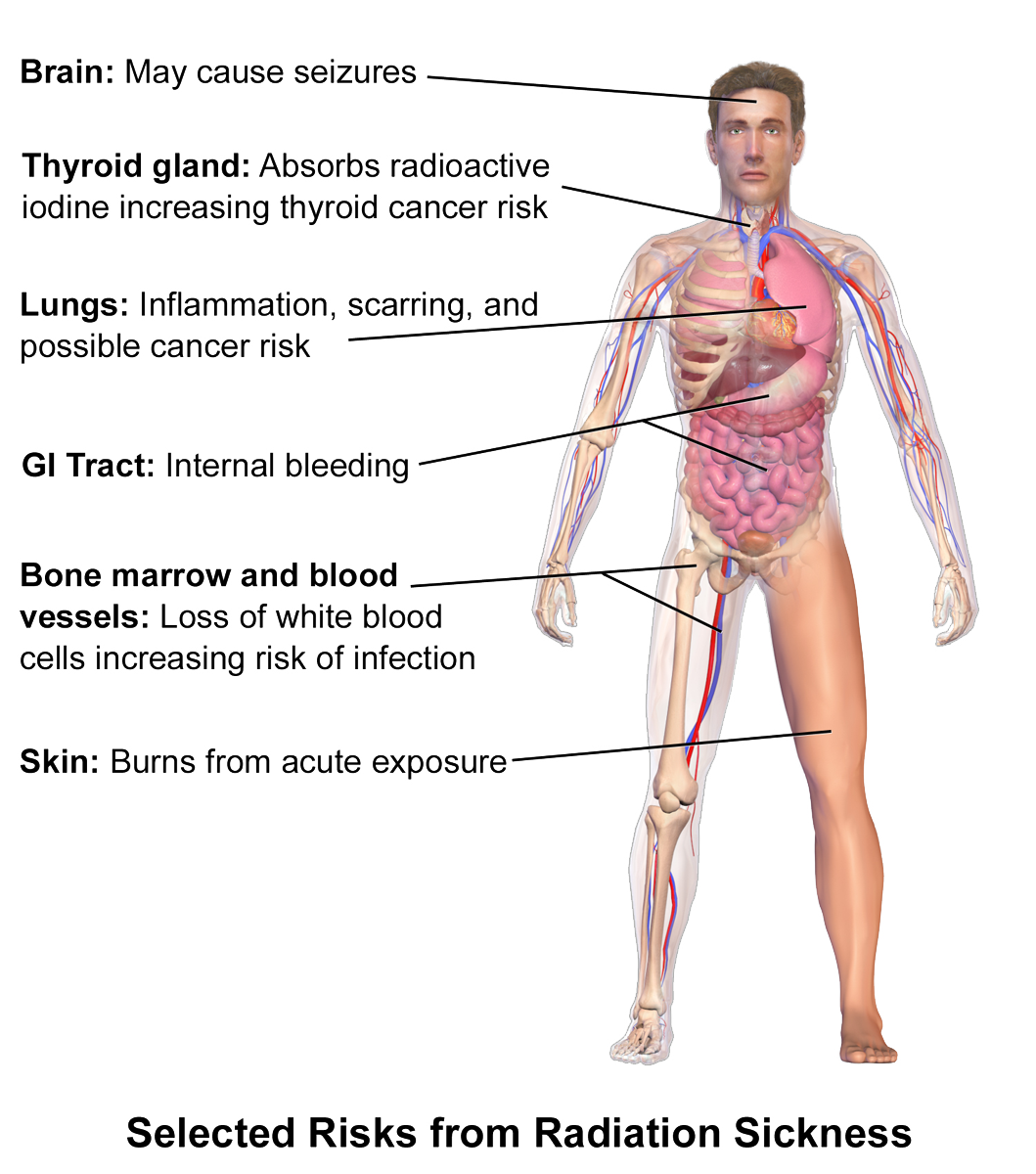
Risks to the human body due to Radiation Sickness

Radionuclides are reactive forms of elements that can be present in drinking water either through manmade or natural processes. Every radionuclide has its own half-life, therefore has its own specific rate of measurement before decaying. There are some radionuclides that decay in seconds while others takes millions of years. Once they decay, radionuclides turn into radioisotopes. This process emits radiation. Exposure to radiation leads to acute and chronic consequences for human health, including radiation sickness, cancer, and cardiovascular disease. The EPA has issued standards for alpha particles, beta particles and photon emitters, radium and uranium. There is a combined standard of 4 mrem/year for beta emitters, a gross alpha standard for all alphas of 15 pCi/L, and a combined radium 226/228 of 5 pCi/L. Uranium and radium are given a different standard of 30 μg/L. EPA published its initial radionuclides regulation in 1977, and updated the standard in 2000.

== Substances for which there are no federal standards ==
EPA maintains the Contaminant Candidate List (CCL), a list of substances which are being considered for possible regulation in the federal drinking water program. In an effort to assess the importance of certain substances as contaminants, the National Primary Drinking Water Regulations have required some public water systems to monitor for some of those substances.

=== Unregulated contaminant monitoring ===
The unregulated contaminant monitoring program keeps track of whether or not certain chemicals are present in PWS and at what level. EPA stores the monitoring data submitted by the PWS in a National Contaminant Occurrence Database, and considers the data in the development of CCLs and future regulations.

EPA published its Fifth Unregulated Contaminant Monitoring Rule in December 2021. A sample of very small PWS (serving less than 3,000 people), and all larger systems are required to monitor for 29 perfluorinated alkylated substances (PFAS) and lithium between January 2023 through December 2025.

=== MTBE ===
Methyl tert-butyl ether (MTBE) is used as a gasoline additive, as well as in various industrial manufacturing processes. The compound has contaminated groundwater and soil across the U.S., and its use has been banned in some states, including California and New York. (See MTBE controversy.) EPA included MTBE on its first Contaminant Candidate List, published in 1998, but has not announced whether it will develop a regulation.

=== Perchlorate ===
Perchlorate has been detected in public drinking water supplies of over 11 million people in 22 states at concentrations of at least 4 parts per billion (ppb). Above a certain concentration perchlorate alters the production of thyroid hormones by the body, chemicals that are essential for proper development of the fetus and for normal metabolic functioning of the body. According to patient advocate and writer Mary Shomon, people with thyroid conditions, as well as pregnant women and their fetuses are particularly at risk. However, according to the Perchlorate Information Bureau, an industry-supported group, sound scientific and medical research shows that the low levels of perchlorate being detected in drinking water are not dangerous to human health. Still according to the same source, these studies on adults, newborns and children provide reason to believe that low levels of perchlorate (even at levels many times higher than the minute amounts being found in some drinking water supplies) also have no measurable effect on pregnant women or fetuses.

One source of perchlorate in drinking water is the past production of solid rocket propellants using perchlorate, combined with poor disposal practices. Industrial accidents and agricultural fertilizers are also suspected as sources of contamination of drinking water by perchlorate. Perchlorate is also found in breast milk at significant levels, possibly attributable to perchlorate in drinking water and foods. The challenge of defining an acceptable level of perchlorate in drinking water sets two opposing groups with significantly different views against each other. In a draft risk assessment made in 2002, EPA suggested that levels higher than 1 part per billion (ppb) pose a health risk. In contrast, the Defense Department contended that perchlorate at 200 ppb has no lasting effect on humans. Perchlorate is one of only four of the seventy chemicals for which EPA has set public health goals that have a safety factor of 10, rather than the usual safety factors of 100 or 1000. In 2004 eight states had non-binding advisories for perchlorate in drinking water, ranging from 1 to 18 ppb. Only two states—Massachusetts and California—set legally binding maximum contaminant levels on the allowable amount of perchlorate in drinking water, at 2 ppb and 6 ppb respectively.

EPA issued an "Interim Health Advisory" for perchlorate in 2009, while it continued to evaluate whether to issue regulatory standards. In 2011 the agency announced that it would develop regulations for perchlorate. Following a 2016 consent decree issued by a federal district court in New York, EPA published a proposed rule on June 26, 2019, with a proposed maximum contaminant level of 0.056 mg/L for public water systems.

On June 18, 2020, EPA announced that it was withdrawing its 2019 proposal and its 2011 regulatory determination, stating that it had taken "proactive steps" with state and local governments to address perchlorate contamination. In September 2020 the Natural Resources Defense Council (NRDC) filed suit against EPA for its failure to regulate perchlorate. NRDC stated that the chemical has now been detected in 26 states, and that 26 million people may be affected by perchlorate in their drinking water. Pursuant to a court order, EPA plans to issue proposed and final rules for perchlorate, by 2025 and 2027, respectively.

=== Pharmaceutical substances ===
Many pharmaceutical substances are not regulated under the Safe Drinking Water Act. They have been found in tiny concentrations in the drinking water of several US cities affecting at least 41 million Americans, according to a five-month inquiry by the Associated Press published in March 2008. Researchers do not yet understand the exact risks from decades of persistent exposure to random combinations of low levels of pharmaceuticals.

Pharmaceuticals are included in a broader group of substances currently being studied by EPA, "Pharmaceuticals and Personal Care Products (PPCPs)." This group includes classes of common consumer products such as cosmetics, fragrances, vitamins and sunscreen products. In 2010 EPA stated that "Further research suggests that certain drugs may cause ecological harm...To date, scientists have found no evidence of adverse human health effects from PPCPs in the environment."

=== Radon ===
EPA proposed regulations for radon in 1991 and 1999. In 2010 it was reported that EPA had not finalized the proposal due to concerns raised by some utilities about high costs for controlling radon. However, nine states had issued their own radon guidelines.

== Water quality of private wells ==
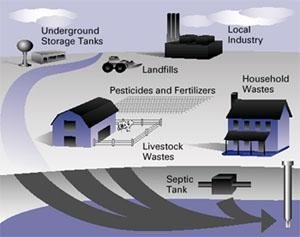
Potential sources of well water contamination

Approximately 13 million households in the US get their drinking water from privately owned wells. Private wells are not regulated by EPA. In general, private well owners are responsible for testing their wells, and some states provide guidance and technical assistance on testing.

A 2020 study found that children raised in homes with unregulated wells had a 25% increased risk of elevated blood lead compared to children raised in homes supplied by water utilities regulated by the SDWA.

== See also ==
- Drinking water quality legislation of the United States
- Water quality (ambient/environmental)
- Water supply and sanitation in the United States
