= Drinking water quality standards =

Quality parameters set for drinking water

Drinking water quality standards describes the quality parameters set for drinking water. Water may contain many harmful constituents, yet there are no universally recognised and accepted international standards for drinking water. Even where standards do exist, the permitted concentration of individual constituents may vary by up to ten times from one set of standards to another. Many countries specify standards to be applied in their own country. In Europe, this includes the European Drinking Water Directive and in the United States, the United States Environmental Protection Agency (EPA) establishes standards as required by the Safe Drinking Water Act. China adopted its own drinking water standard GB3838-2002 (Type II) enacted by Ministry of Environmental Protection in 2002. For countries without a legislative or administrative framework for such standards, the World Health Organization (WHO) publishes guidelines on the standards that should be achieved.

Where drinking water quality standards do exist, most are expressed as guidelines or targets rather than requirements, and very few water standards have any legal basis or, are subject to enforcement. Two exceptions are the European Drinking Water Directive and the Safe Drinking Water Act in the United States, which require legal compliance with specific standards. In Europe, this includes a requirement for member states to enact appropriate local legislation to mandate the directive in each country. Routine inspection and, where required, enforcement is enacted by means of penalties imposed by the European Commission on non-compliant nations.

== Range of standards ==
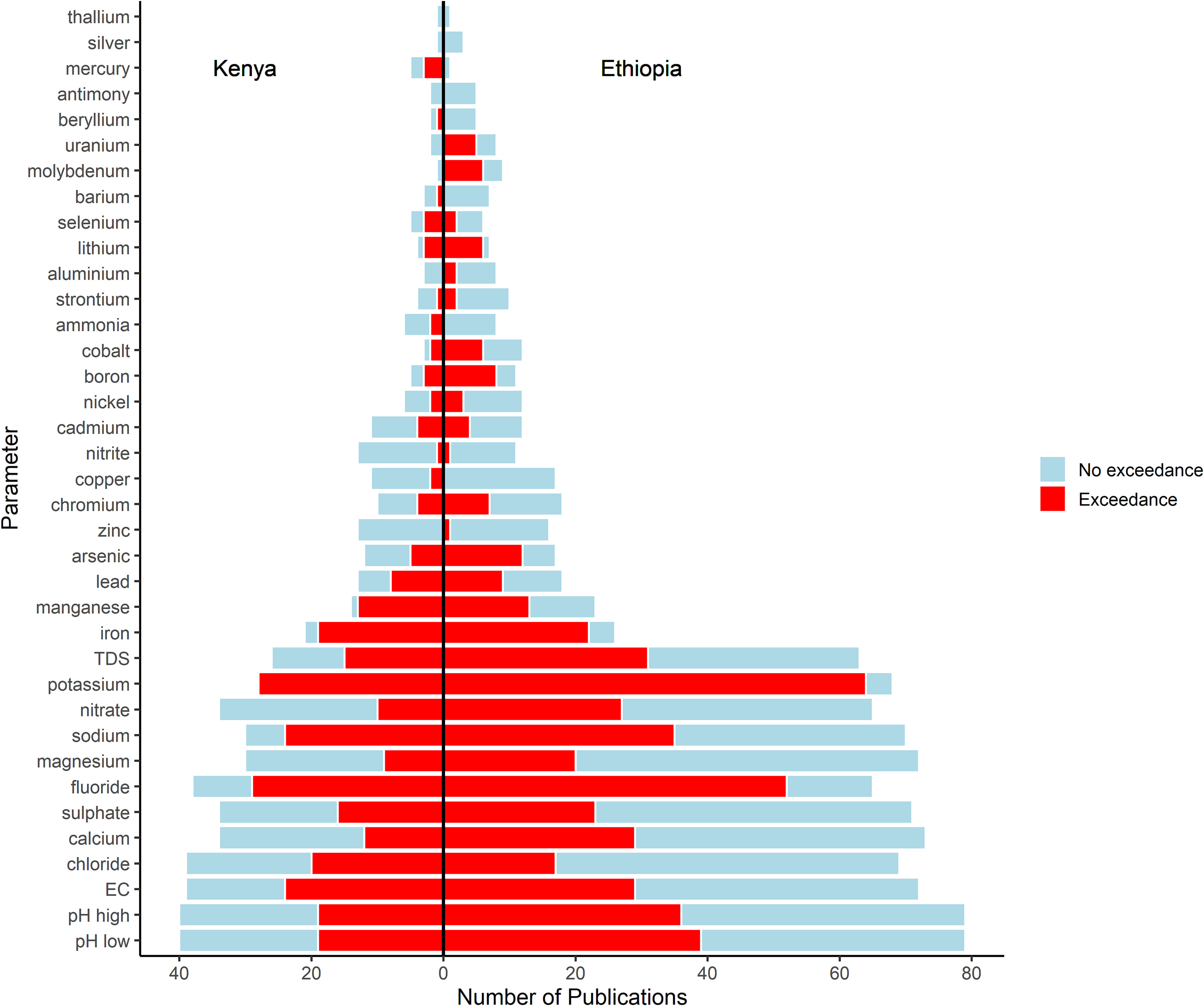
Example of comparison of drinking water quality parameters with thresholds (standards) in Kenya and Ethiopia. The chosen thresholds are from the country's standards or WHO health guideline or East Africa Standard (EAS) for natural potable water.

Drinking water standards include lists of parametric values, and also specify the sampling location, sampling methods, sampling frequency, analytical methods, and laboratory accreditation (AQC). In addition, a number of standards documents also require calculation to determine whether a level exceeds the standard, such as taking an average. Some standards give complex, detailed requirements for the statistical treatment of results, temporal and seasonal variations, summation of related parameters, and mathematical treatment of apparently aberrant results.

For example, when comparing drinking water quality parameters in Kenya and Ethiopia with published guideline values (thresholds), scientists compared several standards: the Kenyan drinking water standard, Ethiopian standard, WHO health guideline, WHO Aesthetic guideline and the EAS (East African Standards) for natural potable water. Furthermore, the non-regulatory health-based screening levels (HBSLs) for cobalt, lithium, silver, strontium, and thallium published by the United States Geological Survey and EPA were also included in the analysis.

== Parametric values ==
A parametric value in this context is most commonly the concentration of a substance, e.g. 30 mg/L of iron. It may also be a count such as 500 E. coli per litre or a statistical value such as the average concentration of copper is 2 mg/L. Many countries not only specify parametric values that may have health impacts but also specify parametric values for a range of constituents that by themselves are unlikely to have any impact on health. These include colour, turbidity, pH, and the organoleptic (aesthetic) parameters (taste and odour).

It is possible and technically acceptable to refer to the same parameter in different ways that may appear to suggest a variation in the standard required. For example, nitrite may be measured as nitrite ion or expressed as N. A standard of "nitrite as N" set at 1.4 mg/L equals a nitrite ion concentration of 4.6 mg/L. This is an apparent difference of nearly threefold.

== Standards by country ==
Countries with guideline values as their standards include Canada, which has guideline values for a relatively small suite of parameters, New Zealand, where there is a legislative basis, but water providers have to make "best endeavours" to comply with the standards, and Australia.

=== Australia ===
Drinking water quality standards in Australia have been developed by the Australian Government National Health and Medical Research Council (NHMRC) in the form of the Australian Drinking Water Guidelines. These guidelines provide contaminant limits (pathogen, aesthetic, organic, inorganic, and radiological) as well as guidance on applying limits for the management of drinking water in Australian drinking water treatment and distribution.

=== China ===
China adopted its own drinking water standard GB3838-2002 (Type II) enacted by Ministry of Environmental Protection in 2002.

=== European Union ===
The following parametric standards are included in the Drinking Water Directive and are expected to be enforced by appropriate legislation in every country in the European Union. Simple parametric values are reproduced here, but in many cases the original directive also provides caveats and notes about many of the values given.

- Acrylamide 0.10 μg/L
- Antimony 5.0 μg/L
- Arsenic 10 μg/L
- Benzene 1.0 μg/L
- Benzo(a)pyrene 0.010 μg/L
- Boron 1.0 mg/L
- Bromate 10 μg/L
- Cadmium 5.0 μg/L
- Chromium 50 μg/L
- Copper 2.0 mg/L
- Cyanide 50 μg/L
- 1,2-dichloroethane 3.0 μg/L
- Epichlorohydrin 0.10 μg/L
- Fluoride 1.5 mg/L
- Lead 10 μg/L
- Mercury 1.0 μg/L
- Nickel 20 μg/L
- Nitrate 50 mg/L
- Nitrite 0.50 mg/L
- Pesticides 0.10 μg/L
- Pesticides 0.50 μg/L total
- Polycyclic aromatic hydrocarbons 0.10 μg/L sum of concentrations of specified compounds
- Selenium 10 μg/L
- Tetrachloroethene and trichloroethene 10 μg/L sum of concentrations of specified parameters
- Trihalomethanes 100 μg/L sum of concentrations of specified compounds
- Vinyl chloride 0.50 μg/L

=== United States ===
In the United States, the federal legislation controlling drinking water quality is the Safe Drinking Water Act (SDWA) which is implemented by EPA, mainly through state or territorial health agencies.

EPA has set standards for over 90 contaminants organised into six groups: microorganisms, disinfectants, disinfection byproducts, inorganic chemicals, organic chemicals and radionuclides. States and territories must implement rules that are at least as stringent as EPA's to retain primary enforcement authority (primacy) over drinking water. Many states also apply their own state-specific standards, which may be more rigorous or include additional parameters. Many countries look to the standards set by EPA for appropriate scientific and public health guidance and may reference or adopt US standards.

== World Health Organization guidelines ==
The WHO Guidelines for Drinking-water Quality (GDWQ) include the following recommended limits on naturally occurring constituents that may have direct adverse health impact:

- Arsenic 10 μg/L
- Barium 10 μg/L
- Boron 2400 μg/L
- Chromium 50 μg/L
- Fluoride 1500 μg/L
- Selenium 40 μg/L
- Uranium 30 μg/L

Organic species:

- Benzene 10 μg/L
- Carbon tetrachloride 4 μg/L
- 1,2-Dichlorobenzene 1000 μg/L
- 1,4-Dichlorobenzene 300 μg/L
- 1,1-Dichloroethane 30 μg/L
- 1,2-Dichloroethene 50 μg/L
- Dichloromethane 20 μg/L
- Di(2-ethylhexyl)phthalate 8 μg/L
- 1,4-Dioxane 50 μg/L
- Edetic acid 600 μg/L
- Ethylbenzene 300 μg/L
- Hexachlorobutadiene 0.6 μg/L
- Nitrilotriacetic acid 200 μg/L
- Pentachlorophenol 9 μg/L
- Styrene 20 μg/L
- Tetrachloroethene 40 μg/L
- Toluene 700 μg/L
- Trichloroethene 20 μg/L
- Xylene 500 μg/L

== Comparison of parametric values ==
The following table provides a comparison of a selection of parameters for concentrations listed by WHO, the European Union, EPA, and Ministry of Environmental Protection of China.

Notes
" indicates that no standard has been identified by editors of this article and ns indicates that no standard exists. μg/L = micrograms per litre, or 0.001 ppm; mg/L = 1 ppm, or 1000 μg/L.
* means action level; not a concentration standard. A public water system exceeding the action level must implement "treatment techniques" which are enforceable procedures.
** TT (treatment technique). The public water system must certify that the combination of dose and monomer level does not exceed: acrylamide = 0.05% dosed at 1 mg/L (or equivalent); epichlorohydrin = 0.01% dosed at 20 mg/L (or equivalent).

Parameter	Table	World Health Organization	European Union	United States	China	Canada	India (BIS)
1,2-dichloroethane		"	3.0 μg/L	5 μg/L	"	"	
Acrylamide		0.0005 mg/L	0.10 μg/L	TT**	"	"	
Aluminium	Al	0.9 mg/L	0,2 mg/L			no limit listed	0.03 mg/L
Antimony	Sb	0.02 mg/L	5.0 μg/L	6.0 μg/L	"	6.00 μg/L	
Arsenic	As	0.01 mg/L	10 μg/L	10 μg/L	50 μg/L	10.0 μg/L	0.05 mg/L
Barium	Ba	1.3 mg/L	ns	2 mg/L	"	1.00 mg/L	
Benzene		0.01 mg/L	1.0 μg/L	5 μg/L	"	"	
Benzo(a)pyrene		"	0.010 μg/L	0.2 μg/L	0.0028 μg/L	"	
Beryllium	Be					"	
Boron	B	2.4 mg/L	1.0 mg/L	"	"	5.00 mg/L	1.0 mg/L
Bromate	Br	0.01 mg/L	10 μg/L	10 μg/L	"	"	
Cadmium	Cd	0.003 mg/L	5 μg/L	5 μg/L	5 μg/L	5.00 μg/L	0.01 mg/L
Calcium	Ca					200 mg/L	75 mg/L
Chromium	Cr	0.05 mg/L	50 μg/L	0.1 mg/L	50 μg/L (Cr6)	0.050 mg/L	0.05 mg/L
Cobalt	Co					"	
Copper	Cu	2 mg/L	2.0 mg/L	1.3 mg/L*	1 mg/L	1.00 mg/L	0.05 mg/L
Cyanide	CN	"	50 μg/L	0.2 mg/L	50 μg/L	"	0.05 mg/L
Epichlorohydrin		"	0.10 μg/L	TT**	"	"	
Fluoride	F	1.5 mg/L	1.5 mg/L	4 mg/L	1 mg/L	"	1.0 mg/L
Gold	Au					no limit listed	
hardness	CaCO3					0–75 mg/L = soft	300 mg/L
Iron	Fe		0,2 mg/L			0.300 mg/L	0.3 mg/L
Lanthanum	La					no limit listed	
Lead	Pb	0.01 mg/L	10 μg/L	15 μg/L*	10 μg/L	10.0 μg/L	0.05 mg/L
Magnesium	Mg					50.0 mg/L	30 mg/L
Manganese	Mn	0.08 mg/L	0, 05 mg/L			0.050 mg/L	0.1 mg/L
Mercury	Hg	0.006 mg/L	1 μg/L	2 μg/L	0.05 μg/L	1.00 μg/L	0.001 mg/L
Molybdenum	Mo					no limit listed	
Nickel	Ni	0.07 mg/L	20 μg/L	"	"	no limit listed	
Nitrate		50 mg/L	50 mg/L	10 mg/L (as N)	10 mg/L (as N)	"	45 mg/L
Nitrite		3 mg/L	0.50 mg/L	1 mg/L (as N)	"	"	
Pesticides (total)		"	0.50 μg/L	"	"	"	Absent
Pesticides (individual)		"	0.10 μg/L	"	"	"	
pH						6.5 to 8.5	6.5 to 8.5
Phosphorus	P					no limit listed	
Polycyclic aromatic hydrocarbons		"	0.10 μg/L	"	"	"	
Potassium	K					no limit listed	
Scandium	Sc					no limit listed	
Selenium	Se	0.04 mg/L	10 μg/L	50 μg/L	10 μg/L	10.0 μg/L	0.01 mg/L
Silicon	Si					no limit listed	
Silver	Ag	0.1 mg/L				0.050 mg/L	
Sodium	Na					200 mg/L	
Strontium	Sr					no limit listed	
Tetrachloroethene and trichloroethene		40 μg/L	10 μg/L	"	"	"	
Tin	Sn					no limit listed	
Titanium	Ti					no limit listed	
Tungsten	W					no limit listed	
Uranium	U	0.03 mg/L				0.10 mg/L	
Vanadium	V					no limit listed	
Zinc	Zn					5.00 mg/L	5.0 mg/L
vinyl chloride			0.50 μg/L				
chlorides	Cl		250 mg/L				250 mg/L
electrical conductivity			2500 μS/cm at 20 °C				
Total dissolved solids							<1000 ppm
Sulphate							200 mg/L

== See also ==
- Water pollution
