= Long Term 2 Enhanced Surface Water Treatment Rule =

Environmental regulation in the United States

The Long Term 2 Enhanced Surface Water Treatment Rule ("LT2ESWTR" or simply "LT2") is a 2006 regulation promulgated by the United States Environmental Protection Agency (EPA) pursuant to the Safe Drinking Water Act. The rule required public water systems to install more stringent treatment systems to control the microorganism Cryptosporidium and other pathogens.

== Background ==
EPA began drafting the LT2 rule following the 1993 Milwaukee Cryptosporidiosis outbreak, in which it is believed that municipal sewage infected with cryptosporidium was accidentally discharged into the city of Milwaukee, Wisconsin's drinking water.

== Principal requirements ==
- Public water systems (PWS) must conduct source water monitoring for cryptosporidium
- Filtration systems for PWS with the highest levels of cryptosporidium
- All unfiltered systems must inactivate cryptosporidium using disinfection technologies such as ozone, ultraviolet light, or chlorine dioxide.

== Controversy ==
The LT2 rule was criticized for mandating costly public works projects (such as coverage of open-air reservoirs) that may be unnecessary and/or unlikely to address the kind of problem that was responsible for the Milwaukee incident. William R. MacKenzie, M.D., a Centers for Disease Control epidemiologist who served as the Epidemic Intelligence Officer on the Milwaukee case, stated, "Standards for water treatment facilities were about to be implemented throughout the nation; but even those would not have stopped the Milwaukee outbreak."

== Review of regulatory requirements ==
In response to criticism that the rule unfairly burdens public water systems that are not exposed to municipal sewage, EPA conducted three public meetings in 2011 and 2012 about the LT2 rule, and invited the public to submit information and data to support future regulatory decisions. In a 2017 Federal Register notice, EPA stated that it "did not identify new information related to potentially revising" the regulatory requirements for cryptosporidium and other listed pathogens, and requested additional public comments.
