= Public water system =

Organization providing drinking water for public use

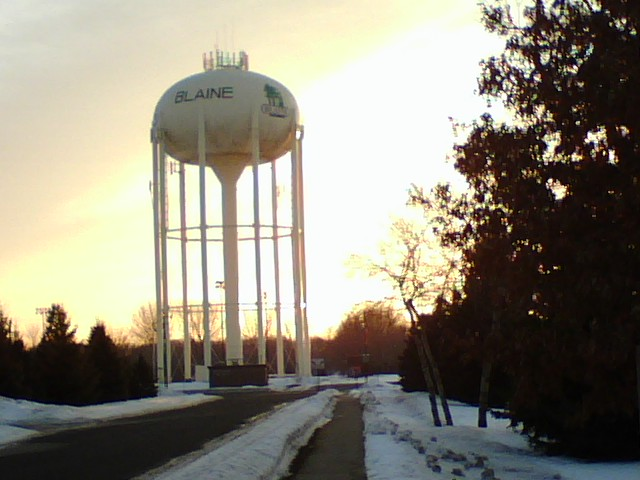
Water towers are used to store water at a height sufficient to pressurize a water supply distribution system

Public water system is a regulatory term used in the United States and Canada, referring to specific utilities and organizations providing drinking water.

== United States ==
The US Safe Drinking Water Act and derivative legislation define a "public water system" as an entity that provides "water for human consumption through pipes or other constructed conveyances to at least 15 service connections or serves an average of at least 25 people for at least 60 days a year." The term "public" in "public water system" refers to the people drinking the water, not to the ownership of the system.

Some US states (e.g. New York) have varying definitions.

Over 286 million Americans get their tap water from a community water system. Eight percent of the community water systems—large municipal water systems—provide water to 82 percent of the US population.

=== Subcategorization ===
The United States Environmental Protection Agency (EPA) has defined three types of public water systems:

- Community Water System (CWS). A public water system that supplies water to the same population year-round.
- Non-Transient Non-Community Water System (NTNCWS). A public water system that regularly supplies water to at least 25 of the same people at least six months per year. Some examples are schools, factories, office buildings, and hospitals, which have water systems.
- Transient Non-Community Water System (TNCWS). A public water system that provides water in a place such as a gas station or campground where people only remain for a short period.

There are over 148,000 public water systems.

- Approximately 52,000 CWS serve the majority of the U.S. population
- Approximately 85,000 NTNCWS
- Approximately 18,000 TNCWS.

EPA also classifies water systems according to the number of people they serve:

- Very Small water systems serve 25-500 people
- Small water systems serve 501-3,300 people
- Medium water systems serve 3,301-10,000 people
- Large water systems serve 10,001-100,000 people
- Very Large water systems serve over 100,000 people.

Water systems may be categorized by their source of water:

- Groundwater, generally from wells
- Surface water and groundwater "under the influence" of surface water
- Purchase of water from another Public Water System.

=== Water-related diseases and contaminants in public water systems ===
Sources of drinking water are subject to contamination and require appropriate treatment to remove disease-causing contaminants. Contamination of drinking water supplies can occur in the source water and the distribution system after water treatment has already occurred. There are many sources of water contamination, including naturally occurring chemicals and minerals (for example, arsenic, radon, uranium), local land use practices (application of fertilizers and pesticides; concentrated animal feeding operations), manufacturing processes, and sewer overflows or wastewater releases.

The presence of contaminants in water can lead to adverse health effects, including gastrointestinal illness, reproductive problems, and neurological disorders. Infants, young children, pregnant women, the elderly, and people whose immune systems are compromised because of AIDS, chemotherapy, or transplant medications may be especially susceptible to illness from some contaminants.

The US Centers for Disease Control and Prevention publishes a list of the leading causes of waterborne outbreaks in public water systems.

== Canada ==
The Canadian provinces of Manitoba and Nova Scotia also use this definition.

== See also ==
- Water supply
- Drinking water quality in the United States
- Water supply and sanitation in Canada
