= Flint (film) =

2017 television film by Bruce Beresford

- Written by: Barbara Stepansky
- Directed by: Bruce Beresford
- Starring: Betsy Brandt; Jill Scott; Marin Ireland; Lyndie Greenwood; Rob Morrow; Queen Latifah
- Music by: John Debney
- Country of origin: United States
- Original language: English

Production
- Running time: 120 minutes
- Production company: Sony Pictures Television

Original release
- Network: Lifetime
- Release: October 28, 2017

Flint is a 2017 television drama film directed by Bruce Beresford and produced by Sony Pictures Television. The plot is based on the Flint water crisis in Flint, Michigan, and follows several residents of the city as they discover lead contamination in the town's water supply, and suffer the effects of lead poisoning. It premiered on Lifetime on October 28, 2017. The film stars Queen Latifah, Betsy Brandt, Jill Scott and Marin Ireland.

== Plot ==
On April 25, 2014, the city of Flint, Michigan switches its water supply from the Detroit Water and Sewerage Department, fed by Lake Huron and the Detroit River, to the local Flint river in order to save money while the Karegnondi water pipeline is built. Dayne Walling, the city's mayor, is present at the opening of the river's water treatment facility. Shortly after the switch, residents begin to experience varying symptoms: local mother LeeAnne Walters notices her son scratching an inflamed rash, and disc jockey Melissa Mays suffers a seizure while bringing her son to the hospital for a growing fever. Hospital worker Adina Banks sneaks her boyfriend Jake into her mother Iza's house, but while they take a shower, they notice the water coming from the faucets is reddish-brown. Shortly afterwards, a notice is sent to every resident of Flint stating the city's water quality does not comply with the Safe Drinking Water Act and that citizens should boil water.

Reading about the effects of the carcinogens in the water, LeeAnne attends a city council meeting in January 2015 and expresses her concerns. Jerry Ambrose, Flint's emergency manager, downplays her worries and claims the water is going through an "adjustment period". A disgruntled LeeAnne leaves, and is joined by activist Nayyirah Shariff, who tells her that nine months is too long for water to adjust. Meanwhile, Melissa is diagnosed with multiple health issues due to the effects of the contaminated water, including osteoarthritis and liver cirrhosis. LeeAnne calls city utility manager Mike Glascow, who tests a sample of the water and finds that the lead levels are seven times above the healthy limit. LeeAnne's son is later diagnosed with lead poisoning. Four months pregnant with Jake's child, Adina goes to her doctor for her usual checkup and finds out that she has miscarried. Devastated by the news, Adina is consoled by her mother Iza while Jake stops responding to her texts and calls.

That April, the city council meets again and votes to switch the water supply back to Lake Huron and the Detroit river. However, Ambrose vetoes the decision, citing a lack of city funding. Melissa acquires the city's public water records; she, LeeAnne, and Nayyirah discover that the corrosion control measures intended to prevent lead from leaching into the water supply ended at the time of the water switch. Worried about the connection between the lead and her miscarriage, Adina sneaks her bloodwork records out of the hospital and gives them to another doctor, Mona Hanna. LeeAnne meets with Environmental Protection Agency agent Miguel Del Toral, who believes her story and refers them to water corrosion expert Marc Edwards at Virginia Tech. At a city hall meeting in July, the citizens of Flint attend and reveal more health issues related to the water. When Iza reveals an infected rash on her shoulder and the miscarriage of her grandchild, the city government stops making excuses. Miguel drafts a memo to his superiors, but after it is ignored, he reaches out to the American Civil Liberties Union.

Edwards acquires 300 water test kits and sends them to Flint, hoping to obtain a large enough sample size across the city to expose the lead issue. City residents deliver the kits door-to-door, including Adina; she is interrupted by a returning Jake, who begs for her forgiveness. The results of the tests prove beyond reasonable doubt that thousands of city residents were exposed to elevated lead levels. Meanwhile, Mona Hanna holds a press conference in which she reveals her analysis of Adina's hospital records. Facing negative press, Michigan governor Rick Snyder proposes installing water filters in every home before signing a bill reconnecting the city to Detroit water.

It is revealed that Mike Glascow's initial test of LeeAnne's drinking water sample was discarded by a corrupt official within the city government. Mayor Walling, who claims ignorance of the entire issue and attempts to blame his cabinet, loses his bid for re-election. Several members of the city government are charged with negligence as a result of the crisis, including emergency manager Jerry Ambrose, while a task force begins the long process of replacing all corroded water pipes in the city.

== Cast ==
- Betsy Brandt as LeeAnne Walters
- Jill Scott as Nayyirah Shariff
- Marin Ireland as Melissa Mays
- Queen Latifah as Iza Banks
- Rob Morrow as Marc Edwards
- Lyndie Greenwood as Adina Banks, Iza's daughter
- Christian Potenza as Dennis Walters, LeeAnne's husband
- Dylan Taylor as Adam Mays, Melissa's husband
- Cassius Crieghtney as Jake, Adina's boyfriend
- Anwen O'Drisoll as Kaylie Walters
- Brian Bridger as JD Walters
- Isaak Bailey as Gavin Walters
- Lucas Misaljevic as Garrett Walters
- Mathew Edmondson as Caleb Mays
- Declan Cooper as Christian Mays
- Connor Donnell as Cole Mays
- Juan Carlos Velis as Miguel Del Toral
- Sonia Dhillon Tully as Dr. Mona Hanna-Attisha
- Arlene Duncan as Claire McClinton
- Sandy Jobin-Bevans as Mayor Dayne Walling
- Brian Hamman as Mike Glascow
- Harry Judge as Curt Gueytte
- Martin Roach as Pastor Harris

== Production ==
In January 2017, Cher announced plans to produce and star in a film about a fictional woman dealing with the Flint water crisis. Cher later dropped out of the project in March, citing a "serious family issue". Queen Latifah and Jill Scott were subsequently cast in the film. Latifah also served as the film's executive producer, through her production company Flavor Unit Entertainment. Lyndie Greenwood joined the cast in April. The film's screenplay is based on the Time magazine cover story "The Poisoning of an American City".

Primary filming took place on location in Toronto and Hamilton, Ontario, with the Hamilton City Hall serving as the exterior of Flint City Hall. The movie premiered on October 28, 2017 on the Lifetime television network.

== Accolades ==
Year	Award	Category	Nominee(s)	Result	Ref.
2018	NAACP Image Awards	Outstanding Television Movie, Limited Series or Dramatic Special	Flint	Nominated	
2018	NAACP Image Awards	Outstanding Actress in a Television Movie, Limited Series or Dramatic Special	Queen Latifah	Won	
2018	NAACP Image Awards	Outstanding Actress in a Television Movie, Limited Series or Dramatic Special	Jill Scott	Nominated	
2018	Critics' Choice Awards	Best TV Movie	Flint	Nominated	
2018	Primetime Emmy Awards	Outstanding Television Movie	Flint	Nominated	
