= Marc Edwards (professor) =

American engineer & professor (born 1964)

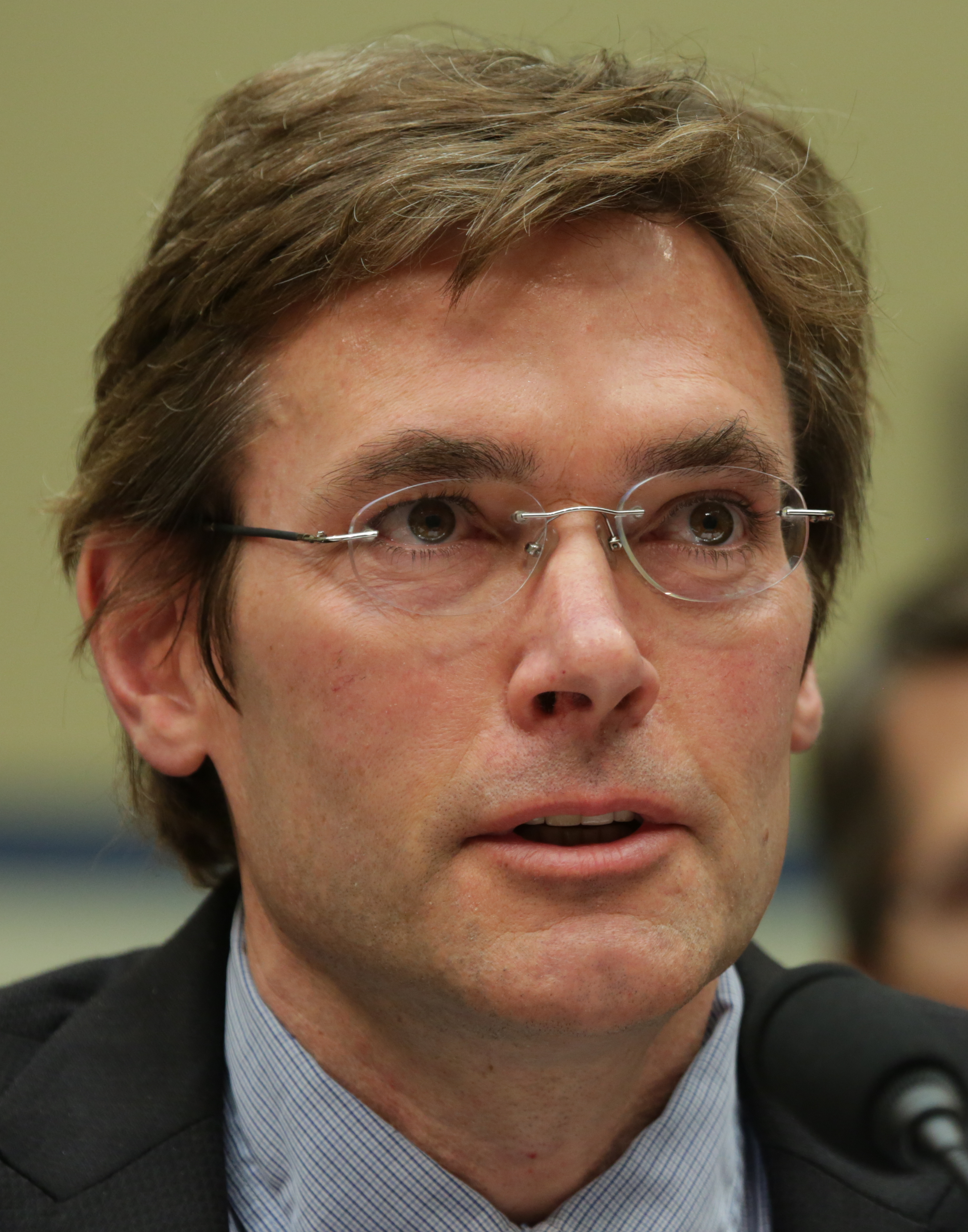
- Edwards testifying during the Flint water crisis hearing, March 2016
- Born: 1964 (age 61–62)
- Education: State University of New York at Buffalo (B.S.); University of Washington (M.S., Ph.D.)
- Alma mater: State University of New York at Buffalo; University of Washington
- Occupation: Professor
- Employer: Virginia Tech
- Known for: Water-supply safety and engineering
- Title: Charles P. Lunsford Professor of Civil and Environmental Engineering
- Term: August 23, 2004–present
- Predecessor: Clifford Randall
- Board member of: Association of Environmental Engineering and Science Professors (president, 2001–2005)
- Children: 2
- Awards: MacArthur Fellow, 2007; Outstanding Faculty Award, 2007; Praxis Award in Professional Ethics, 2010

Marc Edwards (born 1964) is an American civil and environmental engineer. He is a University Distinguished Professor in the Charles E. Via Jr. Department of Civil and Environmental Engineering at Virginia Tech. An expert on water treatment and corrosion, Edwards's research on elevated lead levels in Washington, D.C.'s municipal water supply gained national attention, changed the city's recommendations on water use in homes with lead service pipes, and caused the Centers for Disease Control and Prevention to admit to publishing a report so rife with errors that a congressional investigation called it "scientifically indefensible." He is considered one of the world's leading experts in water corrosion in home plumbing, and a nationally recognized expert on copper corrosion. He is also one of the whistleblowers in the Flint water crisis, along with Dr. Mona Hanna.

Edwards was named a MacArthur Fellow in 2007. The program cited him for "playing a vital role in ensuring the safety of drinking water and in exposing deteriorating water-delivery infrastructure in America’s largest cities." In 2004, Time magazine featured him as one of the United States' most innovative scientists.

== Biography ==
Edwards, a native of the Buffalo, New York area, received a Bachelor of Science degree in biophysics from the State University of New York at Buffalo in 1986. He received his Master of Science in 1988 and his Ph.D. in engineering in 1991 from the University of Washington.

Edwards taught at the University of Colorado at Boulder. In 1997, he joined the faculty of Virginia Tech's department of civil and environmental engineering. From 2001 to 2005, he served as president of the board of directors for the Association of Environmental Engineering and Science Professors. He delivered Virginia Tech's Graduate School Commencement address on December 19, 2008.

He lives with his wife Jui-Ling and their two children in Blacksburg, Virginia.

== Lead levels in Washington, D.C. water supply (2003-2010) ==
Edwards's research in the mid-1990s focused on an increasing incidence of pinhole leaks in copper water pipes. Homeowners contacted him about the leaks, some of which were occurring 18 months after installation. After a century of using copper for water pipes, the expectation is that they will last for 50 years in residential applications. The District of Columbia Water and Sewer Authority (WASA) funded Edwards's research into the cause of the leaks.

A group of Washington, DC homeowners asked Edwards to investigate their corroding copper pipes in March 2003. Suspecting the water, he tested for lead. The accepted limit for lead in drinking water is 15 parts per billion (ppb). Edwards' meter, which could read values up to 140 ppb, showed off-the-scale readings even after he had diluted the sample to ten percent of its original strength. The water contained at least 1,250 ppb of lead. "Some of it would literally have to be classified as a hazardous waste," he said. At the time, WASA recommended that customers in areas served by lead pipes allow the water to run for 30 seconds to one minute as a precaution. Edwards' tests showed that the highest lead levels occurred 30 seconds to a few minutes after the tap was opened.

When Edwards brought his concerns to WASA, the agency threatened to withhold future monitoring data and research funding from him unless he stopped working with the homeowners. The Environmental Protection Agency (EPA) discontinued its subcontract with him. With his funding cut off, Edwards paid his engineering students out of his own pocket so that they could continue the research.

After the Washington Post ran front-page stories in January 2004 about the problem, a Congressional hearing was held in March 2004 where Edwards testified. At the hearing, Edwards identified the cause of the readings as monochloramine, a disinfecting chemical that had replaced chlorine in the water supply in March 2000. Chloramine-treated water, he said, picks up lead from pipes and solder and does not release it, resulting in elevated levels. Chloramine also doesn't break down over time, as chlorine does, so there is always some in the water system. Edwards also testified that WASA's attempts to replace lead pipes with copper pipes could exacerbate the problem, because the copper increases corrosion of the old lead.

Following the discontinuation of chloramine treatment in 2004, Edwards and his colleagues continued to study the long-term effects of the elevated water lead levels; their article "Elevated Blood Lead in Young Children Due to Lead-Contaminated Drinking Water," published in the journal Environmental Science and Technology, won that publication's Editor's Choice Award for the best science paper of 2009.

Referring to a study by the Centers for Disease Control and Prevention (CDC) that essentially dismissed the idea of health risks from DC's lead-contaminated water, Edwards wrote to James Stephens, the CDC's associate director of science: "Why is it that every child I have personal knowledge of, who had a strong chance of having elevated blood lead from water, is either deleted or otherwise misrepresented in the data that CDC has and used for this publication?" Edwards did not receive a response until March 2008, when Stephens wrote "We have examined CDC's role in the study and have found no evidence of misconduct."

As a result of Edwards's research, the United States House of Representatives' science and technology subcommittee conducted a congressional investigation into the matter. They concluded that the CDC made "scientifically indefensible" claims that the lead levels in DC were not harmful, knowingly using flawed data. In the wake of the investigation, Edwards called for the CDC paper's senior author to resign. The day after the House report was released, the CDC released a public statement admitting to their errors. James Elder, former national director of groundwater and drinking water for the EPA, said "Had Edwards not gotten involved, this would never have come out."

In 2010, the CDC said that 15,000 homes in the D.C. area might still have water supplies with dangerous levels of lead. Following Edwards's recommendation, the DC water authority now warns homeowners with lead water-supply lines to let the tap run for ten minutes before drinking or cooking.

During his work on the Washington water quality, said Bill Knocke, head of Virginia Tech's civil and environmental engineering department, Edwards was so concerned about the public health impact that he was hospitalized due to the stress.

== Notable projects (2004-2014) ==
In 2006, Edwards suggested that the EPA testing procedure for lead in tap water could miss elevated levels because it called for homeowners to remove the aerator from their faucet before drawing water for testing. The screen in the aerator, he said, could trap lead particles; if so, water drawn for testing would not reflect the full lead exposure experienced by people drinking from the faucet under normal use.

In 2007, the University of North Carolina at Chapel Hill hired Edwards to investigate water-quality problems in three buildings. When UNC asked its engineering faculty for guidance, their response was "We have two words for you—Marc Edwards." He found "low-grade and fixable" lead contamination, which he blamed on "lead-free" brass plumbing fixtures. According to Edwards, Federal regulations permit up to 8 percent lead in "lead-free" brass fixtures, which can leach from the fixtures if the water is corrosive. He says that the Federal standard uses a water formulation that is remarkably tame compared to actual water supplies, allowing such fixtures to pass lead-leaching tests. Edwards provided a solution to UNC's problem: Accelerate the leaching of the lead by running each faucet at full flow for ten minutes, and then leaving it open at a trickle for three days, after which most of the lead had leached out.

In a 2008 radio interview, Edwards noted that the United States has over five million lead water pipes, many of which are nearing the end of their useful life. "In some cases, you can take a single glass of water," he said, "and if you're unlucky, and it has that piece of lead in it, you can get a very high dose of lead, similar to that which you could obtain by eating lead paint chips."

During the Society of Environmental Journalists' 2008 annual meeting, the group was given a tour of Edwards's lab. He told them that the number one cause of waterborne disease outbreaks in the United States is pathogens growing in home water heaters. Energy-conscious households may set their water heater's thermostat to 120 °F (49 °C), but that temperature encourages the growth of microbes such as mycobacteria. A setting of 140 °F (60 °C) would kill such organisms. Edwards says that infections from inhaling steam from contaminated water in the shower, or contact with contaminated water in a hot tub, kill an estimated 3,000 to 12,000 Americans each year.

Responding to a 2009 Associated Press investigation of contaminants found in the drinking water of schools across the United States, Edwards was quoted as saying "If a landlord doesn't tell a tenant about lead paint in an apartment, he can go to jail. But we have no system to make people follow the rules to keep school children safe?"

Edwards has also warned about the unintended effects of state-of-the-art water conservation techniques being used in new buildings. Systems such as rainwater capture and water recycling, he says, may reduce the flow of water from the city's system so much that the water remains in the plumbing for as much as three weeks before use. This can cause the water to pick up lead and grow bacteria. He has called for a more holistic approach to water quality monitoring.

In 2011, the Robert Wood Johnson Foundation's Public Health Law Research Program funded a $450,000 study of the 1991 Lead and Copper Rule, an EPA regulation relating to drinking water. Edwards will spearhead the study.

== Flint water crisis (2015-present) ==
In September, 2015, after receiving a call from Flint, Michigan citizen, LeeAnne Walters, Edwards formed a water study team and traveled to Flint, Michigan to perform a study that uncovered high levels of lead in potable water. The city's water source had been switched from the Detroit water system to the Flint River in 2014, exposing over 100,000 people to high lead levels and affecting up to 12,000 people with lead poisoning.

Edwards' initiative inspired Mona Hanna-Attisha, a Flint public health advocate and pediatrician, to perform her own study on Flint’s children that found that the lead levels in their blood increased as a result of the water source switch. Edwards and Hanna-Attisha's results caused the City of Flint, the State of Michigan and the United States to declare a state of emergency.

In early 2016, Edwards testified twice before the United States House Committee on Oversight and Government Reform on the crisis, and was appointed to Michigan Governor Rick Snyder's Flint Water Interagency Coordinating Committee, to alleviate problems related to the water crisis.

In 2016, Edwards gave an interview to The Chronicle of Higher Education arguing for scientists to work in the public interest.

In July 2018, Edwards filed a $3 million defamation lawsuit against Flint mother Melissa Mays and two other activists Paul Schwartz and Yanna Lambrinidou. The lawsuit came in the wake of the Flintcomplaints.com letter, signed by over 60 Flint residents, expressing certain grievances with Edwards. On March 19, 2019, the case was dismissed by Judge Michael F. Urbanski, the Chief Judge for the Western District of Virginia, ruling that Edwards could not use litigation to silence criticism and advance scientific claims. The ruling noted, "the Flint water crisis is a paradigmatic example of a matter of public concern where the freedom to call for an ‘investigation’ into the activities of those in positions of significant persuasive power and influence is essential.”

On November 7, 2019, Edwards was interviewed on Detroit's NPR station, WDET in Season 2 of the station's podcast series titled, "Created Equal," which focused on the people involved with the Flint Water Crisis.

== Notable projects (2019-present) ==
In 2019, Edwards headed a Virginia Tech research team to investigate elevated salt levels in water wells on 100 farms in Fishers Landing, New York.

== Awards and honors ==
- 1989 Outstanding MS Thesis award. Water Pollution Control Federation
- 1990 H.P. Eddy Medal. Outstanding Paper in Journal Water Pollution Control Federation
- 1992 Academic Achievement Award. Outstanding Dissertation. 2nd Place. American Water Works Association
- 1992 Outstanding Doctoral Thesis Award. Association of Environmental Engineering and Science Professors
- 1994 Outstanding Paper in Journal American Water Works Association
- 1995 Outstanding Paper in Journal American Water Works Association
- 1996 National Science Foundation Presidential Faculty Fellowship. Awarded by the White House/NSF for work on corrosion in water distribution systems
- 2000 Distinguished Service Award from the Association of Environmental Engineering and Science Professors, for service as Chair of the AEESP Awards Committee
- 2003 Deans Award for Research Excellence - Virginia Tech
- 2003 Walter L. Huber Research Prize from American Society of Civil Engineers (ASCE)
- 2003-2005 President of Association of Environmental Engineering and Science Professors (AEESP)
- 2005 Distinguished Service Award from the Association of Environmental Engineering and Science Professors, for service as board member and President of the Association
- 2006 Outstanding Paper in J. American Water Works Association-Water Quality Division
- 2006 Alumni Award for Research Excellence - Virginia Tech
- 2007 Outstanding Faculty Member Award. State of Virginia Council on Higher Education, for his work on the Washington lead issue.
- 2008 MacArthur Foundation Fellowship. Awarded to Marc for his "vital role in ensuring the safety of drinking water and in exposing deteriorating water-delivery infrastructure in America’s largest cities." The fellowship included a five-year, $500,000 grant.
- 2008 National Assoc. of Corrosion Engineers (NACE) Technical Achievement Award
- 2010 Praxis Award in Professional Ethics. Villanova University, citing his "exemplary dedication" to his ethical ideals in the Washington, DC water lead level investigation.
- 2010 Best Science Paper, Environmental Science and Technology
- 2010 Outstanding Dissertation Advisor Award - Virginia Tech
- 2011 Outstanding Paper in Journal American Water Works Association-Research Division
- 2012 Barus Award for Defending the Public Health and Interest. IEEE Social Implications of Technology
- 2015 ARCADIS / Association of Environmental Engineering and Science Professors (AEESP) Frontier in Research Award
- 2016 Association of Environmental Engineering and Science Professors (AEESP) Award for Outstanding Contribution to Environmental Engineering and Science Education
- 2016 The American Society of Civil Engineers (ASCE) 2016 President’s Medal
- 2016 Dr. Marc Edwards and Dr. Mona Hanna-Attisha presented the commencement address at Virginia Tech on May 13, 2016 in Lane Stadium, in Blacksburg, VA.
- 2016 Dr. Marc Edwards and Dr. Mona Hanna-Attisha were named to Time magazine's list of 'The 100 Most Influential People'. They are listed in the 'Pioneers' section.
- 2016 Dr. Marc Edwards and Dr. Mona Hanna-Attisha were named as one of 10 finalist for Time magazine's annual 'Person of the Year' award.
- 2016 Smithsonian Magazine's American Ingenuity Award for Social Progress.
- 2017 Dr. Marc Edwards and Shuhai Xiao were named Virginia Outstanding Scientists for 2017 by the Science Museum of Virginia and Virginia Governor, Terry McAuliffe on February 9, 2017.
- 2017 Dr. Marc Edwards and Dr. Mona Hanna-Attisha received the inaugural Disobedience Award from the MIT Media Lab on July 21, 2017, for their work in the Flint water crisis.
- 2017 Engineering News-Record Award of Excellence for his work in Flint, Michigan.
- 2018 Scientific Freedom and Responsibility Award from the American Association for the Advancement of Science (AAAS).
- 2019 Hoover Humanitarian Medal presented at the American Society of Civil Engineers annual meeting on Oct. 12, 2019 in Miami, Florida. He is the 71st recipient of the award.

== See also ==
- Lead contamination in Washington, D.C. drinking water
- Virginia Tech College of Engineering
- Association of Environmental Engineering and Science Professors
- MacArthur Foundation Fellowship
