= Pittsburgh water crisis =

2016 lead contamination crisis in Pittsburgh, Pennsylvania, US

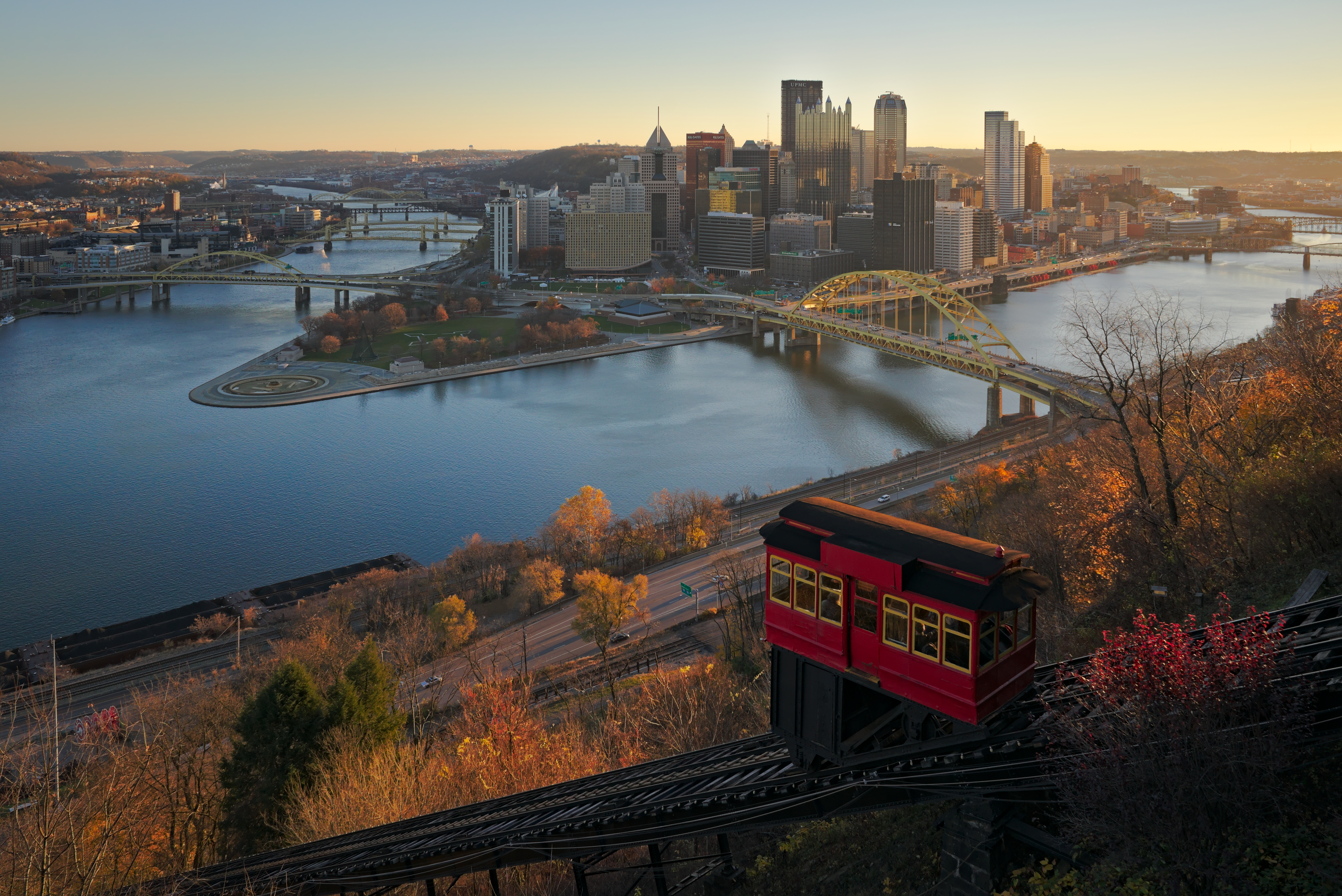
Pittsburgh rivers converge

The Pittsburgh water crisis arose from a substantial increase in the lead concentration of the city's water supply. Although catalyzed by the hiring of cost-cutting water consultancy Veolia in 2012, and an unauthorized change of anti-corrosion chemicals in 2014, this spike in lead concentration has roots in decades of lead pipe corrosion. The Pittsburgh Water and Sewer Authority (PWSA) first exceeded the U.S. EPA lead action level of 15 parts per billion (ppb) in 2016. This level of lead exposure poses serious health risks to residents, particularly children and pregnant women. Since 2020, the Pittsburgh Water and Sewer Authority has been in compliance with the EPA Lead and Copper Rule. In 2018, the Authority introduced orthophosphate to improve corrosion control in lead service lines and has replaced over 13,000 public lead service lines since 2016 with a goal of replacing all residential lead service lines by 2027.

The PWSA initiated a comprehensive plan to make changes to the city's water infrastructure and treatment protocol. In 2016, PWSA launched the Community Lead Response program, focusing on the systematic replacement of lead services and the introduction of orthophosphate into the water treatment process to mitigate lead corrosion. By April 2024, PWSA had successfully removed over 11,000 public lead service lines and more than 7,500 private lines at no direct cost to consumers.

These initiatives have led to a significant decline in lead levels within Pittsburgh's water supply. As of February 2024, the 90th percentile lead concentration in high-risk homes was measured at 3.58 ppb, substantially below the Environmental Protection Agency's action level of 15 ppb. The authority aims to eliminate all lead service lines by 2026 and continues to provide free lead testing kits and maintain an interactive lead map for public awareness. PWSA's efforts have garnered national recognition, including EPA's inaugural AQUARIUS Award and the Association of Metropolitan Water Agency's Gold Award.

== Lead contamination ==
While the Pittsburgh water supply has suffered from a variety of contaminants, the most persistent contaminant has been lead from the aging lead piping infrastructure throughout the city. Lead is particularly harmful because it can reach drinking water when service lines and fixtures containing lead corrode, posing significant risks to public health through lead poisoning, especially for children and pregnant individuals.

=== Causes ===
Pittsburgh's water lines include a significant number of lead service lines, which are small diameter pipes connecting properties to the larger water mains in the street. In 2014, the Pittsburgh Water and Sewer Authority (PWSA) broke state law by switching from soda ash to caustic soda as an anti-corrosion treatment without first receiving the necessary approval and permits from the Pennsylvania Department of Environmental Protection (DEP) as required by Pennsylvania. This unauthorized switch sparked an increase in erosion levels that made the water's lead levels spike beyond the federal limit of 15 ppb, driven by the fact that soda ash leaves protective solid residue on the walls of lead pipes where caustic soda does not. Subsequent water testing in 2016 revealed that more than 17% of homes sampled had lead concentrations exceeding this federal action level, prompting scrutiny. An audit conducted by the Pennsylvania Auditor general in 2017 criticized PWSA for severe operational failings, including changing leadership and inconsistent testing practices.

=== Risks ===
Lead is a neurotoxin and of particular concern for children and pregnant women. In children, lead poisoning can contribute to developmental delays and learning disabilities as well as other varied symptoms including but not limited to irritability, weight loss, abdominal pain, and hearing loss. Newborns with lead poisoning are prone to premature death, lower birth weight, and delayed growth. If women get lead poisoning while pregnant, they are at a higher risk for miscarriage. With prolonged exposure, lead poisoning can lead to damage in the brain, kidneys, and nervous system in people of all ages, especially children. Elevated blood lead levels in children have been associated with developmental delays, learning difficulties, and behavioral issues. Although the federal lead threshold is 15 ppb, any concentration of lead in water is potentially dangerous to consumers. The Centers for Disease Control and Prevention (CDC) has a set reference level of 5 micrograms per deciliter (μg/dL) to identify children with elevated blood lead levels.

== Public response ==
About a quarter of PWSA customers receive their water supply through lead pipes, thus putting a significant portion of the Pittsburgh population at risk for lead consumption, prior to the corrosion control improvements made in 2020. Pittsburgh residents have complained about rising water prices alongside contaminated water. Many unknowingly consumed lead-contaminated water, which can have long-term negative health effects. Some Pittsburgh residents have taken matters into their own hands by submitting personal water samples to laboratories for lead testing as well as installing filters into their water systems.

== Connections to Flint, Michigan ==
Flint, Michigan, had a highly publicized and controversial lead crisis shortly before Pittsburgh.

=== Veolia ===
Both the Flint and Pittsburgh lead crises were triggered by the misuse of chemicals to treat their water supplies. In both cases, the private water company Veolia was involved. Flint hired Veolia in 2015 to help manage the lead crises, while Pittsburgh hired Veolia in 2012 before the lead crises emerged as a serious issue. However, in both cases, the cities complained of the lead problems worsening after hiring Veolia. Michigan attorney general Bill Schuette filed a lawsuit against Veolia in 2016 for professional negligence. The Pittsburgh Water and Sewer Authority similarly tried to press charges, but Veolia struck back with claims that PWSA is responsible for the chemical change that sparked the Pittsburgh lead crises. Ultimately, the charges from both parties were dropped in Pittsburgh, and while the charges in Flint were not dropped, Veolia has not taken responsibility for the lead crisis, particularly since the decision to switch Flint's water source happened prior to the city's contract with Veolia.

=== Publicity ===
In 2017, Virginia Tech professor Marc Edwards, who helped reveal the Flint lead crisis, pointed out that Pittsburgh's lead levels were higher than Flint's. Although the Pittsburgh lead crisis has been of comparable magnitude to Flint's, it has been significantly less publicized as officials have seemingly downplayed the issue. Elected official Chelsa Wagner, controller of Allegheny County which includes Pittsburgh, criticized the Pittsburgh health department for failing to acknowledge the full extent of lead exposure in the area.

== Solutions ==
The Pittsburgh Water and Sewer Authority has proposed both a long term and short-term solution to alleviate the water supply's lead contamination.

=== Long term ===
After a lead test revealed Pittsburgh's water supply was exceeding the federal limit in 2016, the PWSA was ordered to replace public lead service lines. However, as the PWSA embarked on this task, an unexpected obstacle interfered with the progress of the lead pipe removal. Since they were only required to replace public water lines, private lead lines were left behind. This actually leaves the possibility of exacerbating the lead contamination since construction on the public lines physically disturbs the private lines, thus breaking up the lining within the pipes meant to prevent lead erosion. Because of this risk, the practice of removing only public service lines was discontinued mid-2017. A couple of months after the city ceased removing lead lines, legislation was passed that allowed the PWSA to use Pittsburgh's public safety powers to remove both public and private lines. The best, long-term solution is to remove all of the lead service lines in the city, but despite the legislation allowing for this to happen, it is still a lengthy and expensive endeavor that is unlikely to be fulfilled within the next ten years and could cost close to $400 million.

=== Short term ===
While the pipe removal process is underway, the PWSA has decided to add orthophosphate to the water as a means of reducing lead corrosion. Since orthophosphates are attracted to the lining of metal pipes, they serve as a protective coating that prevents lead from leaching out of the pipes. In a study comparing orthophosphate to soda ash, the PWSA and Department of Environmental Protection (DEP) came to the conclusion that orthophosphate would be more effective as an anti-corrosive mechanism. In April 2019, the city began adding orthophosphate to the water supply. Two of four distribution points for orthophosphate are in the Highland Park neighborhood.
