= Plumbosolvency =

Ability to dissolve lead

Plumbosolvency is the ability of a solvent, notably water, to dissolve lead. In the public supply of water this is an undesirable property. In (usually older) consumers' premises plumbosolvent water can attack lead pipes, lead service lines, and any lead in solder used to join copper. Plumbosolvency of water can be countered by achieving a pH of 7.5 by increasing the pH with lime or sodium hydroxide (lye), or by providing a protective coating to the inside of lead pipes by the addition of phosphate at the water treatment works.

While optimal pH for prevention of plumbosolvency is 7.5, performance remains very good in the range pH 7.2-7.6. Achieving this pH has been shown to decrease population blood lead concentrations.(3, 4)

Chlorinating water also reduces dissolved lead. It causes the interiors of lead pipes to become coated with lead chloride, which is very insoluble in cold water. However, lead chloride is fairly soluble in hot water. For this reason, water that is to be used for drinking or the preparation of food should never be taken from a hot-water tap, if the water may have been in contact with lead. Water should be taken from a cold-water tap, and heated in a pan or kettle that does not contain lead or lead solder.

== See also ==
- Drinking water quality standards
- Lead service line
- 2015 Hong Kong heavy metal in drinking water incidents
