= Lead contamination in Washington, D.C., drinking water =

Water contamination incident in the United States

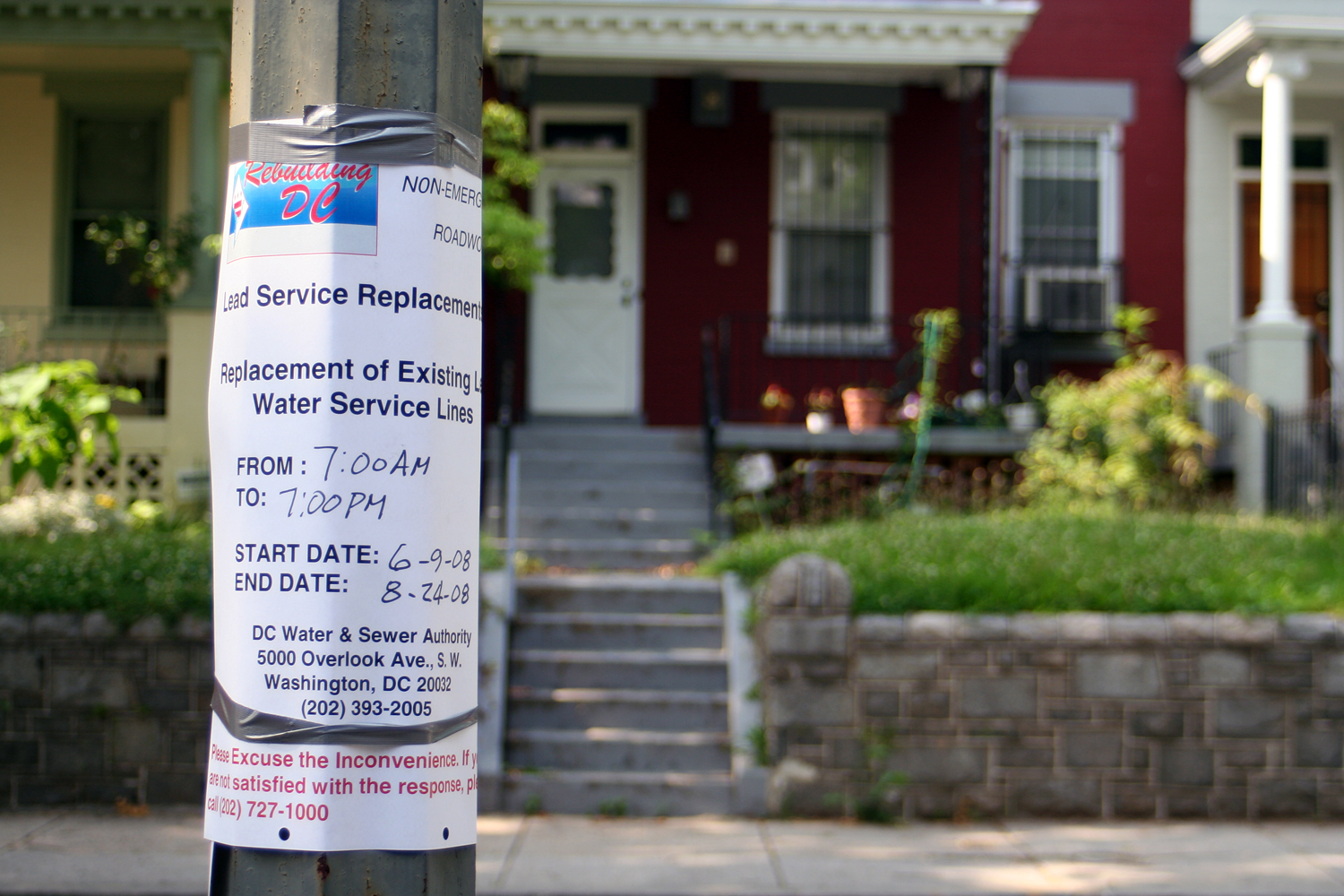
- WASA lead service replacement notice
- Date: 2001
- Duration: Ongoing
- Location: Washington, D.C., United States; 38°54′17″N 77°00′59″W
- Type: Water contamination: Lead
- Cause: Water treatment change and presence of lead service lines in water distribution system
- First reporter: 2002 Washington City Paper, 2004 The Washington Post
- Outcome: 23,000 WASA customers lead service line replacement 15,000 homes in the Washington, D.C., area might still have water supplies with dangerous levels of lead

While performing research into premature pipe corrosion for the District of Columbia Water and Sewer Authority (WASA) in 2001, Marc Edwards, an expert in plumbing corrosion, discovered lead levels in the drinking water of Washington, D.C., at least 83 times higher than the accepted safe limit. He found that the decision to change from chlorine to chloramine as a treatment chemical had caused the spike in lead levels. The contamination has left thousands of children with lifelong health risks and led to a re-evaluation of the use of monochloramine in public drinking-water systems.

After The Washington Post ran a series of front-page articles about Edwards's findings, resulting in widespread public concern, the United States House of Representatives conducted an investigation. The House found that the U.S. Centers for Disease Control and Prevention (CDC) had made "scientifically indefensible" claims in a report that had indicated there was no risk from the high lead levels. The Post investigation uncovered evidence of widespread misreporting of lead levels at water agencies across the United States, leading to regulatory crackdowns and changes in Environmental Protection Agency policies.

The problem was addressed in 2004 by adding additional treatments to the water, preventing the chloramine from dissolving lead in the water mains, solder joints, and plumbing fixtures.

In 2010, the CDC reported that 15,000 homes in the Washington, D.C., area might still have water supplies with dangerous levels of lead.

== 2001–2004: Initial reports of elevated lead ==
In 2001, more than half the water samples taken from 53 D.C.-area homes under the procedures required by the EPA's Lead and Copper Rule showed levels of lead exceeding the national standard of 15 parts per billion (ppb). Lead disrupts the physical and mental development of fetuses, babies, and young children, and can cause kidney problems and high blood pressure in adults. The rule does not assume that there is a "safe" level of exposure, but notes that 15 ppb is an "action level" where utilities must take action. The rule was created in 1991, after research showed that drinking water could account for one-fifth of all lead intake. Lead is not normally present in drinking water; it is released from the inside surface of lead service lines (pipes that run from the main to the house), joints connected with lead-based solder, and lead fixtures inside the house. Based on these findings, WASA was required to notify the public and implement plans to replace lead service lines in key areas of the municipal water system.

The first media attention came in late 2002, when the Washington City Paper ran an article about a resident of American University Park whose water tested six to 18 times the EPA Lead and Copper Rule's action level. WASA found that homes in its service area with lead service lines averaged five times the EPA limit for lead during a year-long period. The results were unexpected; the EPA scientist overseeing D.C.'s water suggested that drought conditions might have raised the alkalinity levels of the Potomac River, leading to a change in the pH of the water. As a result, WASA was required to start replacing seven percent of the district's lead service lines each year until the levels dropped below 0.015 milligrams per liter. At the time, about 23,000 WASA customers had lead service lines.

In March 2003, Marc Edwards, a professor of civil engineering and expert on corrosion in drinking-water systems, was conducting research into an unexpected increase in pinhole leaks in copper water pipes in the D.C. area. WASA funded Edwards's research. Suspecting the leaks were caused by a change in the water chemistry, Edwards used a field meter to test for lead in one home's water. The meter could read values up to 140 ppb. His initial reading pegged the meter, so he diluted the sample to ten percent of its original strength. Even so, diluted, the sample still pegged the meter, indicating the water contained at least 1,250 ppb of lead. "Some of it would literally have to be classified as a hazardous waste," Edwards said.

After Seema Bhat, a water quality manager at WASA, told her superiors at the agency and at the EPA about the lead levels and warned that federal guidelines required aggressive action, she was fired by the agency. A federal investigator found that she had been improperly terminated.

The lead levels required WASA to conduct a wider survey of their water quality. By the fall of 2003, it had tested more than 6,000 homes in the District, finding that two-thirds tested had more than 15 ppb of lead in their water. The survey showed that over 4,000 homes served by WASA had lead levels exceeding the acceptable level. More than a third of the homes surveyed—2,287 out of 6,118—had levels exceeding 50 ppb. The water tested over 300 ppb in 157 homes. Despite this result, WASA did not notify its customers of the risk until November 2003.

Although regulations required WASA to include the specific warning "Some homes in this community have elevated lead levels in their drinking water. Lead can pose a significant risk to your health." In the water bills of each affected customer, WASA's notice omitted key parts of the phrase such as "in their drinking water" and "significant." Although Federal law required WASA to hold public meetings to discuss the problem and actions people could take to protect themselves, they advertised the meetings as being "to discuss and solicit public comments on WASA's Safe Drinking Water Act projects," omitting mention of lead. The EPA was required to review the notice before it was sent out; one D.C. Council member, commenting on the EPA's approval of the faulty notice, asked "Where were you, EPA?" The EPA later found that WASA's notice violated federal law because of the omissions.

In January 2004, The Washington Post reported that the mayor and several D.C. Council members had not been informed of the elevated lead levels. The Washington City Paper said that Carol Schwartz, the councilmember who chaired the Committee on Public Works and the Environment, was not informed of the lead issue until that newspaper contacted her during the last week of January 2004. Early communications from WASA limited the health advisory to pregnant women and small children in homes with lead service leads, but later tests showed the high lead levels were also present in homes with copper service leads.

Meanwhile, on January 2, 2004, WASA called Edwards and threatened to cut off his access to monitoring data needed for his research, and divert funding from him to other researchers, unless he stopped working with the homeowners whose water showed high lead levels. Soon after, the EPA discontinued its own contract with Edwards.

== 2004: The Washington Post ==
The issue became front-page news when The Washington Post ran an article titled "Water in D.C. Exceeds EPA Lead Limit" on January 31, 2004, across six columns of page A1. Reporter David Nakamura was contacted by one of the homeowners whose water was tested by WASA during its survey after he received the test results. Nakamura—who had no prior experience with clean water issues—initially thought it was a minor issue, but agreed to help the homeowner get a response from WASA. When WASA would not give him a straight answer, Nakamura pressed them for full data on the tests. Nakamura says that, even though he was "stunned" at the facts reported in that first story, the Post "had no idea about the size and scope of what was to follow."

The article quoted Erik Olson, an analyst for the Natural Resources Defense Council, as saying "This is a really big deal... If schools go over 20 parts per billion, they immediately take the water out of production." WASA recommended that residents let the tap run for 30 seconds to one minute before using it to reduce the risk.

This first Post article was the first public mention of the theory that the lead levels were tied to monochloramine. The traditional use of chlorine had been stopped four years earlier, out of concerns that it could produce harmful chemicals in the pipes. Long-term exposure to the byproducts from chlorine treatment has been linked with cancer. The paper quoted officials as saying that it was possible chloramine was more corrosive to lead pipes. (In fact, the Army Corps of Engineers, which is responsible for the Washington Aqueduct that supplies water to WASA, rejected a recommendation to add phosphates to the water to prevent lead leaching in the mid-1990s.) The change to chloramine was made after the EPA issued regulations concerning disinfection byproducts formed when chlorine reacts with organic matter in drinking water; the EPA considered these byproducts to be a potential health threat.

After the first article, the Post formed a core team of reporters to investigate the issue. Nakamura was joined by reporters Carol Leonnig, Jo Becker, Avram Goldstein, and D'Vera Cohn; editor Marcia Slacum Greene provided daily oversight. Nakamura was the lead reporter for the breaking news coming from WASA and City Hall, and wrote profiles of key players. Leonnig reported on the federal and EPA response to the contamination. Cohn investigated the Washington Aqueduct angle and worked with water quality and environmental experts. Goldstein covered the DC Department of Health. Becker looked at water quality nationwide.

After the first article appeared, residents inundated WASA's water hotline with calls and overwhelmed water testing laboratories with requests to have their tap water tested for lead contamination. District elected officials immediately called for an emergency public meeting, and established an inter-agency task force with the EPA to investigate and manage the problem. However, messages to the public at the time were often confusing and contradictory: while WASA was suggesting running taps for 90 seconds to flush out any lead, the EPA was demanding that recommendation be changed to ten minutes.

The Post article lead WASA to hand out over 30,000 free water filters, hire health experts, and offer free blood tests to residents. Some water fountains were turned off due to lead levels. In 2004, the D.C. Council held 11 oversight hearings on the issue; the U.S. Congress held four. American University claimed that its water was safe to drink, because the larger water mains feeding commercial sites like the college were not made of lead.

After Nakamura's first few stories for the Post on the issue, he was contacted by Seema Bhat's attorney. Bhat, who was then fighting her dismissal from WASA, shared thousands of internal documents with Nakamura. The documents, Nakamura said, "provided a fairly clear picture" that WASA had been trying to find a way to avoid the cost of replacing pipes and adding additional chemicals to the water. He said Bhat's documents were critical to the Post's investigation. He recalls that, while reading the documents, the team found WASA memos indicating that they tried to find "clean" houses to test to reduce the apparent average lead level from the testing, but the more they tested, the more "dirty" houses they found.

By April 2004, there were reports of some D.C.-area homes reaching lead levels of 6,000 ppb to 48,000 ppb.

In June 2004, the EPA cited WASA for a "serious breach" of the law, including withholding six test results showing high lead levels in 2001, dropping half of the homes that had previously tested high for lead levels in subsequent testing, and avoiding homes known to be at high risk for contamination. In July, a WASA-commissioned report supported the Post's claims that the agency had known about the high lead levels for years, but had failed to notify regulators or the public.

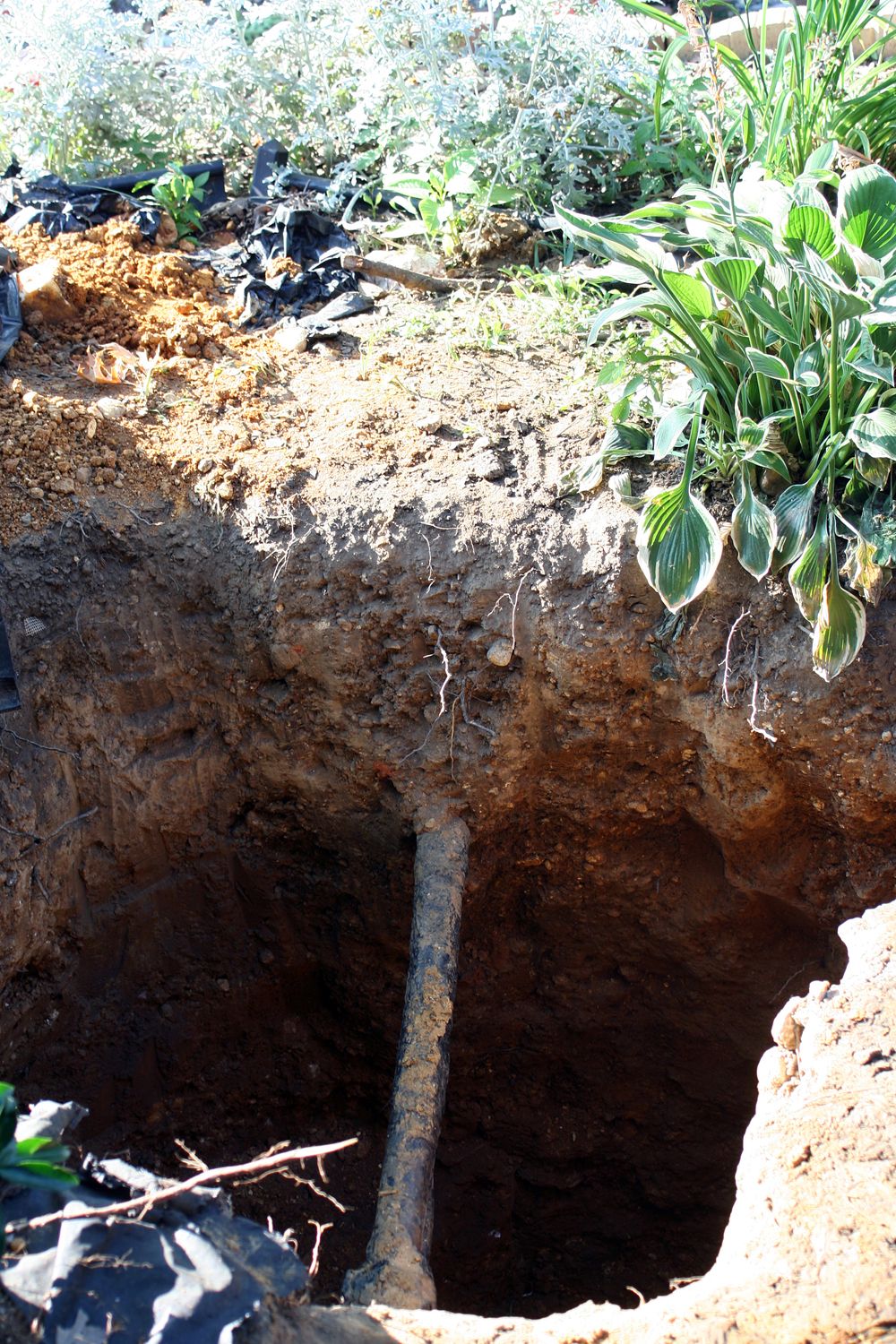
A DC WASA lead service line being replaced in 2008

In August 2004, the Army Corps of Engineers started adding orthophosphate to the water in hopes of preventing lead leaching. By November, WASA's board of directors had committed to a plan that would replace all of the agency's 23,000 lead pipes by 2010, at a cost of $300 million—starting with 2,800 lead pipes to be replaced in 2005. WASA estimated that the repairs would cost residents $6 to $7 a month. The agency was not legally responsible for the portion of the lead service lines within a homeowner's property lines; however, they offered to perform the work at a set rate, and arranged a low-interest loan program with Wachovia Bank to help homeowners afford the cost.

By January 31, 2005, the Post had run over 200 stories on the issue, amassing thousands of pages of correspondence through the Freedom of Information Act. Gloria Borland, a District resident, testified before Congress: "If the [Washington] Post had not exposed this scandal, our children today would still be drinking lead contaminated water."

Post reporters Nakamura, Leonnig, Cohn, Becker, Craig Timberg, Monte Reel, and Sarah Cohen won the 2005 Selden Ring Award for Investigative Reporting for the articles. Michael Parks, director of USC Annenberg's School of Journalism and Pulitzer Prize-winning former editor of the Los Angeles Times, said "The Washington Post's work was a very important piece of journalism—important to every man, woman and child living in the District of Columbia, drinking its water and thinking it was pure. And it was important to the residents of other cities whose water is contaminated by lead and other toxic substances." The award's cash prize of $35,000 is believed to be the largest in journalism. According to Nakamura, some at the Post were surprised to win the award, because of the atypical nature of the Post's investigation. Most winners conduct a long-term investigation and then publish long articles over a few days with the results; the Post covered the investigation as a series of beat stories. Nakamura said he had never heard of the Selden Ring Award until the day his editor told him that the team had won it.

== 2004: The CDC report ==
On March 30, 2004, an "MMWR dispatch," Blood Lead Levels in Residents of Homes with Elevated Lead in Tap Water --- District of Columbia, 2004, was made available on the MMWR web site. It was then published by CDC as "MMWR Weekly, April 2, 2004 / 53(12);268-270." The report "summarizes the results of the preliminary investigations, which indicated that the elevated water lead levels might have contributed to a small increase in blood lead levels (BLLs)." The report describes the background, and the various kinds of blood tests it employed, and explicitly states: "All blood tests were used in this analysis." There is no mention at all of any test results not being available, not even in the caveat section, where other potential sources of error are discussed.

The report concludes that the high amounts of lead in the drinking water may have led to a slight rise of the blood levels; however, not to the levels of official concern. It also claims that the average levels were sinking. However, the report notes that there is no known "risk free" level, and therefore recommends that efforts should be made to eliminate lead in children's blood entirely.

The report later was strongly criticized, both by Marc Edwards and by the United States House Committee on Science, Space and Technology; see § Congressional review of the 2004 CDC paper.

== 2004–05: Government hearings ==
At an oversight hearing before the House Committee on Government Reform in early March 2004, Marc Edwards testified that his studies showed the change from chlorine to chloramine was the cause of the elevated lead levels. He stated that the chloramine-treated water was leaching lead not only from the old lead lines, but also from brass fixtures in homes. Brass is made with lead; even brass classified as "lead free" under the Safe Drinking Water Act can contain up to eight percent lead. Edwards said that this could be the cause of the high lead levels in areas where WASA did not use lead lines. He also cautioned that replacing lead service lines with copper could make the problem worse; newly installed copper lines could react with the chloramine in a way that would increase corrosion of the remaining lead lines in the system. The chief of the Washington Aqueduct disagreed, saying that tests taken after the chloramine treatment commenced did not show any additional corrosiveness. He believed corrosion inhibitors, like orthophosphate, could be added to the water to prevent lead leaching. In the spring of 2004, a temporary switch from chloramine back to chlorine for annual pipe flushing caused a 25 to 30 percent drop in lead levels, lending credence to the chloramine theory. In one home that was tested by WASA before and after the switch, lead levels dropped tenfold.

On March 23, 2004, Anthony A. Williams (the mayor of the District of Columbia) and Carol Schwartz (chair of the D.C. Council's Committee on Public Works and the Environment) wrote a letter to President George W. Bush, asking the federal government to reimburse WASA $24,093,700 and the District of Columbia $1,730,401 to cover expenses from the lead contamination. The letter justified the request for full reimbursement by saying "the regulatory decisions of EPA appear to have generated these costs" and that it would be "inherently unfair" for taxpayers and WASA customers to pay those costs. In 2005, President Bush proposed cutting the EPA's budget by almost a half-billion dollars, mostly from clean-water programs. He wanted to decrease spending on replacing aging water facilities by 83 percent.

On March 30, 2004, the Centers for Disease Control and Prevention (CDC) published a Morbidity and Mortality Weekly Report (MMWR) that found the lead "might have contributed a small increase in blood lead levels." The report claimed that no children with dangerously high blood lead levels were found, even in the homes with the worst lead levels. Officials in other cities, such as New York City and Seattle, cited the report as justification for a less-than-aggressive response to high lead levels in their own water. Water testing in the first six months of 2004 showed 90 percent of homes having 63 ppb of lead or less in the water.

In October 2004, Edwards co-authored an article in the Journal of the American Water Works Association that linked chloramine use with greatly increased lead leaching.

A report commissioned by the D.C. Council released on December 8, 2004, faulted the federal government's regulation of the city's water supply as a factor in the lead contamination. The report noted that no one agency was responsible for the water quality: The Army Corps of Engineers treated the water, WASA delivered it, and the EPA performed the quality checks. It urged the Council to assume authority for the entire system. In the last six months of 2004, 90 percent of homes tested had lead levels of 59 ppb or lower.

The city's interim inspector general, Austin A. Andersen, released a report on WASA's performance in January 2005. Andersen called for WASA to enter a formal agreement with the city's Health Department to ensure that future communications about water health issues were timely and worded appropriately. WASA rejected the need for such an agreement. That same month, the Architect of the Capitol issued a warning to Capitol Hill employees that they should not use water from bathroom or kitchen faucets for drinking or cooking. Some water fountains on the campus were turned off, although employees were told it was okay to continue using the others. One home on Capitol Hill was found to have 308 ppb of lead in 2003.

On January 21, 2005, the EPA ordered WASA to notify more than 400 homeowners that the agency had mistakenly told them their house's water lead levels were safe, and to replace an additional 500 service lines to comply with federal law. The EPA said that WASA had flushed the water line for five minutes before running the lead tests for those homes, resulting in artificially low readings; such a lengthy flush is not permitted by EPA standards. The EPA did not believe that the flushes were done intentionally by WASA to reduce lead levels. The testing had been done as part of an effort to avoid the expense of replacing lead lines in areas where it found low lead levels.

== 2004: Other cities investigated ==
In 1999, an EPA survey estimated that the United States's drinking-water systems were in need of $150 billion worth of repairs over the following 20 years. However, in April 2004, an EPA spokesperson told the Washington Times that "high lead levels are not a pervasive problem." At a Congressional hearing that month, the EPA testified that it had no current information on lead levels in 78 percent of the nation's water systems, and that as many as 20 states had not provided any data.

On October 5, 2004, The Washington Post ran a front-page article reporting that cities across the United States were illegally manipulating lead testing results, such as discarding high readings or avoiding homes likely to have high readings. A former EPA official described it as "widespread fraud and manipulation" on the part of water utilities. That July, however, an EPA administrator told Congress that "we have not identified a systemic problem." Using data from the EPA, the Post identified 274 utilities that had reported unsafe lead levels between 2000 and 2004. Some utilities defended their testing practices as being approved by state regulators; others argued that the lead was actually leaching from customers' fixtures, not their plumbing.

Among the cities that the Post faulted through the EPA data were:

- Boston, where state regulators discovered that at least one quarter of the locations tested were not at high risk for lead contamination;
- Detroit, where the utility failed to test required high-risk homes;
- New York City, which reported lead falling to safe levels in 2000—but omitted 300 test results that would have marked the water as unsafe in 2001 and 2002 if reported;
- Philadelphia, which could not produce documentation for their decision to discard a high test result from 2002—despite being required by federal law to do so—that would have put the city over the EPA limit if it had been included;
- Lansing, Michigan, which discarded four tests that would have put the city's water over the limit because the homeowners supposedly did not follow the proper directions in collecting the samples—even though the law prohibits doing so;
- Ridgewood, New Jersey, which removed "hot" houses from its testing after exceeding the safe limit in 2000;
- Providence, Rhode Island, where high levels were found in 2002, failed to inform the public as required and instead waited more than the legal limit of four months to test again;
- Seattle, where state regulators allowed the utility to miss a 1997 deadline to reduce the corrosiveness of its water by six years, allowing high lead levels to persist during that period;
- Portland, Oregon, where the city and state decided to launch a lead-danger educational campaign instead of building a treatment plant as required by law—and the EPA later suggested the utility drop urban homes with high lead levels from its testing and replace them with suburban homes with significantly lower levels.

The Post article led the United States Attorney for the Southern District of New York to open an investigation into the city's drinking-water lead levels. Regulators in Michigan and Oregon also investigated utilities singled out by the Post in those states. Senators James M. Jeffords and Paul S. Sarbanes called for the EPA to impose tougher standards; Jeffords and Senator Hillary Clinton called for an investigation of the EPA following the Post's findings.

Seattle had already suffered widespread lead contamination in its public school system in 2003. One parent, a scientist who had initiated the investigation there, said "we continue to suffer from an epidemic of lead complacency" nationwide.

The EPA said that between 2003 and 2005, only four large water systems had unsafe lead levels: Washington, D.C.; St. Paul, Minnesota; Port St. Lucie, Florida; and Ridgewood, New Jersey.

== 2005–2006: Lower lead levels ==
By January 2005, a year after the high lead levels were publicized by the Post, advocates were calling for the firing of local and federal officials involved in the issue, saying that they had done too little to fix the problem. Eric Olsen of the Natural Resources Defense Council said that officials "have fallen down on the job" because thousands of residents still had unsafe water. The group Lead Emergency Action for the District called for an overhaul of WASA's management, an independent study of needed improvements to the water system, stronger laws, and action from the EPA. "We want fines and a criminal review," said Olsen.

In March 2005, the EPA proposed changes strengthening the Lead and Copper Rule. The changes require utilities to give test results directly to homeowners, and to notify state and federal regulators before changing water-treatment methods. Critics, such as Clean Water Action, called the changes "revisions at the margins." Rick Maas, co-director of the Environmental Quality Institute at the University of North Carolina, said the revisions would "solve maybe 5 to 10 percent of the problem" with the Rule. Trade organizations, such as the American Water Works Association, found the changes "basically reasonable."

That month, WASA said that recent tests showed encouraging declines in lead levels, which it attributed to the orthophosphate treatments started in August 2004. Out of 51 homes tested, only four had readings above 15 ppb; ten of those homes were above the 15-ppb standard the previous year, but fell below it in this test. WASA also noted that the Army Corps of Engineers would continue using chloramine throughout the year to keep the water chemistry stable. By May 10, 2005, the company was announcing that its tests were "below the '90th percentile lead action level."

As of January 2006, WASA said that about 29 percent of its customers had chosen to replace the lead service lines within the customer's property. In a January press release, WASA said that the average lead level in its most recent tests was 7 ppb. The authority also claimed that a voluntary blood-lead-level screening it funded showed no identifiable public health impact from the elevated lead levels.

The EPA formally reduced its oversight of WASA in May 2006, after testing showed the lead levels had remained below 15 ppb for a full year. However, the agency continued to require WASA to submit 100 samples every six months for at least another year; the normal requirement is 50 samples a year.

Even after the lead levels abated, the Post continued to note other problems with the District's water supply. In 2007, it noted that WASA's periodic "chlorine surge" resulted in high levels of haloacetic acids, a chlorine disinfection byproduct believed to be unsafe. Utilities use annual or biannual chlorine surges to remove pathogens such as cryptosporidium that are not adequately killed by chloramine. Officials from the Washington Aqueduct and WASA said the levels were probably temporary and that the water was safe to drink.

== 2006–10: EPA, CDC, and other expert reports faulted ==
In January 2006, the Government Accountability Office released a study criticizing the EPA's efforts monitoring lead levels in drinking water across the United States. Although the study found that lead in drinking water had generally declined since the 1990s, it noted that data collection problems "may be undermining the intended level of public health protection." There have been studies that show that there is no safe level for lead consumption.

In their 2010 water quality report, DC Water stated that there was lead found in some water samples taken during monitoring. The possible causes linked to the lead contamination was said to be "corrosion of household plumbing systems; erosion of natural deposits." The report did not state where the lead was found or who it impacted.

=== Guidotti paper ===
In 2007, the journal Environmental Health Perspectives published a paper about the public health response to the lead contamination, written by a team of academic investigators headed by Tee Guidotti of George Washington University. Guidotti and his team had been hired as consultants by WASA in 2004; he had told the WASA board that water only accounts for seven percent of the typical two-year-old child's lead exposure. The paper analyzed data from the 2004 screening program, identifying sources of confounding or bias. Four indicators were examined, and none showed evidence that blood lead levels had been affected by the elevation of lead in drinking water. The investigators concluded that the evidence did not clearly demonstrate a correlation between lead in the District's drinking water and blood lead levels. However, they cautioned that a population study was not suitable for establishing such relationships. They called for reduction in exposure from water as well as from other sources. The paper stated "There appears to have been no identifiable public health impact from the elevation of lead in drinking water in Washington DC in 2003 and 2004."

The Guidotti paper was called into question by members of the D.C. Council in February 2009, after The Washington Post ran an article about a more recent study by Marc Edwards that found a correlation between water and blood lead levels in area children. The National Institutes of Health, publisher of the journal in which the paper appeared, were unaware that George Washington University's contract with WASA gave the water authority final approval over anything Guidotti wrote concerning the authority. Guidotti was also supposed to remove the sentence about public health impact from the paper before publication, because experts reviewing the paper had rejected that finding; he failed to do so. Guidotti and WASA both denied that the agency influenced the paper; Guidotti said he did not view the contract as giving WASA preapproval over the paper, and therefore did not disclose it to the journal. In an August 2006 e-mail obtained by the Post from Edwards, Guidotti agreed to replace the sentence with "Measures to protect residents from exposure to lead in drinking water may have prevented more frequent elevations in blood lead" before its publication, but that did not happen. The journal refuses to accept research that is under a sponsor's control; it conducted a review to determine if the paper should be retracted—the journal's first such review in its 30-year history. The paper had been cited as evidence that the lead contamination had not harmed District residents.

In an e-mail to the Washington City Paper, Guidotti refuted any claims that WASA influenced the team's findings. He clarified that WASA's contract was with the university, not Guidotti personally. He said "The data in our 2007 study are valid, the analysis was accurately reported, and we stand by the conclusions."

The review panel convened by Environmental Health Perspectives released its findings in June 2009, finding that the controversial sentence was included due to "inattention to detail" and found no evidence that Guidotti was trying to mislead readers. The panel recommended that Guidotti submit an apology and correction; he did so. The panel said it found evidence that neither Guidotti nor WASA intended for the utility to exercise approval over the research conclusions.

=== Edwards paper ===
The March 1, 2009 issue of Environmental Science and Technology included a paper by Marc Edwards, Simoni Triantafyllidou, and Dana Best that established a link between the elevated lead levels in the drinking water and potentially harmful blood lead levels in area children. The Washington Post announced the results of that study on January 27, 2009. The report found that 42,000 children who were in the womb or under age 2 during the contamination are at risk of health and behavioral problems. In some areas, the number of children with enough lead to cause irreversible IQ loss and developmental delays more than doubled between 2000 and 2003. These findings contradicted previous statements by WASA that there were no health impacts, as well as the 2004 CDC MMWR report. David Bellinger, a Harvard University neurologist, told the Post, "If these data were available previously, I would be surprised that anyone would be assuring the public there was no problem."

The CDC refused to provide Edwards with the data necessary to perform the study. He convinced the Children's National Medical Center to share the data with him in 2008.

The paper won the Editor's Choice Award for Best Science Paper of 2009 from the editors of Environmental Science and Technology.

=== Congressional review of the 2004 CDC paper ===
Edwards's study raised new questions about the March 2004 CDC Morbidity and Mortality Weekly Report that downplayed the health impact of the lead contamination. Salon noted that the CDC had found a link between lead pipes and high childhood blood lead levels in the district in 2007, but did not publicize the study. The principal author of the 2004 study—Mary Jean Brown, who co-authored the 2007 study—acknowledged that thousands of blood tests were missing from the 2004 study, but defended the paper's conclusion that any harm was slight. "There is no indication that DC residents have blood lead levels above the CDC levels of concern," she wrote.

However, Edwards's results came from analysis of the same data used for the 2004 CDC report. When he wrote to the CDC's associate director of science, questioning the report's conclusions and methodology, he received a belated reply: "We have examined CDC's role in the study and have found no evidence of misconduct."

The United States House of Representatives' Science and Technology Committee opened a congressional investigation into the 2004 CDC report. Investigators found that although the CDC and city health department reported dangerous lead levels in 193 children in 2003, the actual number was 486 according to records taken directly from the testing laboratories. Representative Brad Miller of North Carolina called the CDC report's data "wildly incomplete." The underreported results came from the city's health department, which had said the missing tests were omitted because some labs did not report low lead levels to the city. The health department data was also the basis for Guidotti's paper.

The investigation found that the CDC knowingly used flawed data in drafting the report, leading to "scientifically indefensible" claims in the 2004 paper. It also cited the CDC for failing to publicize later research showing that the harm was more serious than the 2004 report suggested. After the investigation's findings were released, the CDC initially stood by the report's findings that no significant harm was caused by the lead, but acknowledged that the claim that no children with lead poisoning had been found was "misleading." Edwards called for the CDC to retract the paper and for Brown's resignation. "If you were a child living in D.C. at that time, a single glass of tap water could have elevated your blood lead to unsafe levels," said Edwards.

The report strongly criticized Brown for failing to check the original lab results. It also noted that one section of the 2004 CDC report said not one of the people living in a home with water lead levels 20 times higher than the action level had elevated blood lead, but it failed to mention that most of those people were drinking bottled or filtered water, not tap water, before their blood was tested—a fact Brown and her co-authors were well aware of. The investigation found that Brown gave her fellow authors just three hours to review her work before it was submitted for publication.

A year after The Washington Post published the results of the investigation, the CDC published a "Notice to Readers" in the May 21, 2010 issue of the Morbidity and Mortality Weekly Report admitting that the 2004 report was misleading. It said the original report "did not reflect findings of concern from the separate longitudinal study that showed that children living in homes serviced by a lead water pipe were more than twice as likely as other DC children to have had a blood lead level ≥10 μg/dL." A further Notice to Readers published in June 2010 clarified that the results in the 2004 report "should not be used to make conclusions about the contribution of water lead to blood levels in DC, to predict what might occur in other situations where lead levels in drinking water are high, or to determine safe levels of lead in drinking water."

The Post described the CDC's Notice to Readers as "a full vindication" for Edwards, who spent tens of thousands of dollars out of his own pocket to fund his research, and who was the target of attempts to besmirch his professional reputation by the CDC and EPA. Tom Sinks, the deputy director of the CDC's national center for environmental health, told the Post "Looking backward six years, it's clear that this report could have been written a little better."

In 2010, the Union of Concerned Scientists (UAS) claimed that the CDC Advisory Committee on Childhood Lead Poisoning had been expected to lower the action level for lead in drinking water below 10 micrograms per deciliter in the summer of 2002. According to the UAS, Tommy Thompson, the Secretary of Health and Human Services, took the unprecedented step of rejecting a number of nominees to the committee selected by staff scientists. Instead, the group claims, Thompson appointed at least two appointees with financial ties to the lead industry. A 2010 Washington Post editorial cited the group's statement as a reason why the District's lead contamination "was practically inevitable" due to politicization of the CDC.

Eleanor Holmes Norton, a Delegate to Congress representing the District, accused the CDC of a coverup. Jim Graham, a member of the D.C. Council, said "To now learn that the Centers for Disease Control not only got it wrong but may have intentionally misled District residents and our water agency is the ultimate betrayal of the public trust."

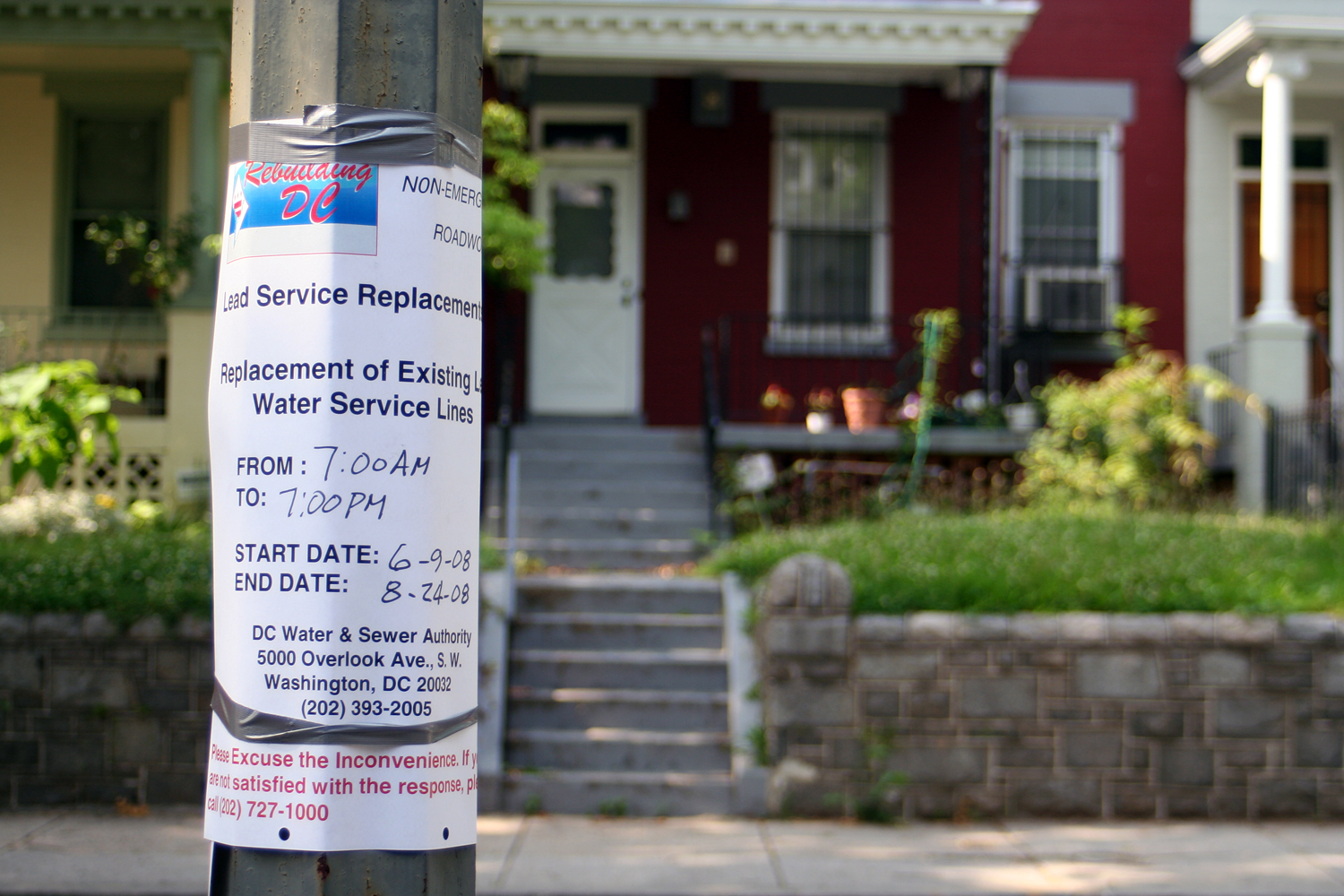
Lead service replacement continued through the 2000s (decade), but may not have helped the problem.

A 2010 study by Brown at the CDC essentially confirmed Edwards's findings. It also found that the 15,000 "partial pipe replacements" performed by WASA—where lead service lines were replaced up to a homeowner's property line, but no further—may not have effectively reduced lead levels, and may have made the problem worse. WASA spent $97 million to replace 17,000 pipes, including the 15,000 partial replacements. A Post article about the report lead to jammed phone lines at WASA and increased demand for bottled-water delivery. The study indicated that there is no safe level of lead in drinking water, and that children in homes with even a partial lead service line are at a much higher risk of lead poisoning than those with no lead in the line. WASA said the finding "is not news" to them; General Manager George Hawkins told WAMU that the utility had been acting as if the CDC's findings were fact for some time before the report was released. Hawkins said that WAMU was not seeing elevated levels of lead in homes with partial pipe replacements.

=== John Parkhurst, et al. lawsuit ===
On February 17, 2009, John Parkhurst, the father of twin boys living on Capitol Hill, through his attorneys Stefanie Roemer and David Sanford of Sanford, Wittels & Heisler, filed a class action lawsuit against WASA in the Superior Court of the District of Columbia, seeking $200 million in compensatory damages plus punitive damages. Parkhurst, a 50-year-old single father and psychologist, prepared food and formula for the boys using tap water from the time they were 8 months old until 2002, when they were two years old. The complaint was later amended to add additional five children, on behalf of a proposed class consisting of all children who, at any time from 2000 to 2004, while six years of age or younger, consumed water supplied by WASA that passed through a line containing lead (whether directly or prenatally through their birth mothers), and who had blood-lead levels of 10 μg/dL or higher. The suit claims that WASA "undertook Herculean efforts to shield itself from liability and to otherwise deny responsibility." Contemporary news reports indicated that WASA had not seen the lawsuit at the time the story broke, but included comments from WASA spokespeople that more studies would be needed before lead in drinking water could be linked to health and behavioral issues. The agency said that such claims would need to be substantiated on a case-by-case basis. WASA's motion to dismiss the complaint was denied in October 2009. In 2012 the named plaintiffs on the case sought to make the case a class action, but on April 8, 2013, Judge Anthony C. Epstein denied their motion for class certification stating that the "class of tap water drinkers under 7 years old with elevated blood lead levels was too broad," and that it was not clear the class had or even possibly would suffer any injury.

=== After Flint ===
In 2016, in congressional testimony, Marc Edwards estimated that the Washington, D.C. crisis was "20 to 30 times worse" than the Flint water crisis.

The Washington Post noted that the problem of lead in Washington, D.C.'s drinking water is decades old. Within this new outlet, there are several articles that use incriminating and extreme headlines to grab the readers attention about the DC Water system. Many media outlets have compared the Flint Water Crisis to the decades old water issue in Washington, D.C., because both problems pertain to lead in drinking water.

== 2017–2018 ==
In 2017, the DC Water Quality Report, Washington, D.C., was found to be in compliance with the EPA's standards for lead within drinking water. However, there is no safe level of lead for children to consume. According to the EPA, lead at any level can be harmful. The EPA has a maximum contamination goal of zero; however, they have not stated how or when they are going to enforce the regulation if it is amended.

During the summer of 2018, Washington, D.C., issued a boil water advisory to all of its residents in the North East and North West areas. This was done as a precaution to citizens since the water did test positive for many different harmful contaminants in the tested areas. In 2018, DC Water's Drinking Water Quality Report states that there is infrastructure in Washington, D.C., that contains lead that may impact the drinking water in certain areas. Tips for how to prevent contamination are provided on the report. All the lead pipes in Washington, D.C., have not been replaced and those that remain may cause problems for those consuming the water. DC Water created an interactive map to show its residents which pipe lines are made out of lead or other dangerous metals. The information was gathered from historical data and inspections. An article published in 2018 by CNN states that the EPA gave the Virginia Tech researcher that found the lead within Flint, Michigan's and Washington, D.C.'s water supplies a grant to search other major cities. The grant consists of $1.9 million and will be used to help people where there is a suspicion of lead being in their drinking water but government officials are not acting on it. This project is said to target Michigan and Louisiana initially then it will branch out to other areas.

== See also ==
- Flint water crisis, another case Dr. Edwards researched
- Water contamination in Lawrence and Morgan Counties, Alabama
