= Water contamination in Lawrence and Morgan Counties, Alabama =

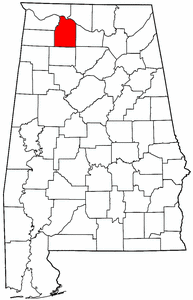
Lawrence County, Alabama

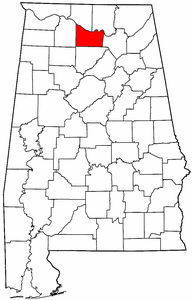
Morgan County, Alabama

Water contamination in Lawrence and Morgan Counties, Alabama, revolves around the presence of perfluorooctanoic acid (PFOA) and perfluorooctanesulfonic acid (PFOS) in the water supply. After the US Environmental Protection Agency (EPA) released new health advisories in March 2016, there was concern over health risks of the levels of PFOA and PFOS present. The responses of different government officials, agencies, and companies raise questions as to whether or not there was any environmental injustice involved.

== History ==
In late 2013, the US Geological Survey and the Environmental Protection Agency studied samples from untreated and treated water from the United States' utilities, where researchers had found traces of chemicals in the water of areas including Lawrence County and Morgan County, Alabama. Although there is minimal information on the long-term effects of the contaminated water, researchers discovered that a fluorinated compound called Perfluorooctanoic acid was in the water sample. This chemical compound has been linked to many other health problems, such as thyroid disease, kidney cancer, and pregnancy-induced hypertension.

Many Alabama residents have been suffering from contaminated water that can cause cancer, congenital disabilities for women of childbearing age, and developmental problems for children. EPA health advisories released on May 19, 2016 prompted government officials to recommend that residents in both Lawrence County and Morgan County avoid drinking the water. After testing the citizens' blood concentration level, the EPA revealed that Lawrence and Morgan Counties had water that was contaminated with water pollutants introduced into the rivers and drinking system. The residents have been advised not to use tap water because scientists have found traces of Perfluorooctanoic acid(PFOA) and Perfluorooctanesulfonic acid(PFOS) in the water source. The two primary pollutants, PFOS and PFOA, are known to be toxic substances that have been linked to causing certain types of cancers and other health symptoms. Companies in the area, such as 3M, Daikin, and its subsidiary Dyneon LLC, have been identified as the likely source of the introduction of pollutants in the water system. There has been much controversy between government officials of varying levels as some question whether or not the alleged water pollution exists or if the numbers are not a concern. As a result, EPA advised the citizens in the counties to refrain from ingesting the water until further studies are done regarding the issue.

On August 6, 2016, the West Morgan-East Lawrence Water Authority released a statement saying that new tests of the water returned a value of 14 parts per trillion, which is below the EPA health advisory level. However, officials of the water authority are still slightly concerned and continue to push for an activated carbon filter.

== Health impacts of PFOA and PFOS ==
=== Effects of PFOA ===
Perfluorooctanic acid (PFOA) is commonly used as a degradation product with other perfluorinated compounds. PFOA is also used in the production of Teflon, also known as polytetrafluoroethylene, which is often used as a non-stick surface of many cooking items. The chemical often occurs in water systems in industrialized countries. Based on various animal data analysis, the compound has toxic effects on the immune system, the endocrine systems, and may also cause tumors. Major manufacturers tried to limit the use of Perfluorooctanoic acid since it has been revealed that water resources have been contaminated with this compound, including industrial sites, municipal waste sites, and industrial wastes. Children exposed to this chemical are at an increased risk of developing thyroid diseases. When the thyroid gland is affected, it can impact other body parts within the human body which can lead to other health symptoms such as growth development. Although the chemical is not visible, the chemical can enter a body's bloodstream if the person consumes the polluted water. Also, humans as well as other living species that consume the contaminated water are at a higher risk of contracting various health problems. The chemical is used in a variety of consumer products such as clothing, food packages, and furniture. According to scientific studies, the leading cause for the introduction of the chemicals in various drinking water sources is due to contamination from nearby industrial plants.

=== Effects of PFOS ===
Perfluorooctane Sulfonate acid (PFOS) is a known global pollutant that is considered toxic to the environment. Although the contaminant is existent in the environment, there is limited information on the effect that Perfluorooctane Sulfonate acid (PFOS) has on the human body. In relations, scientists are still not certain about the long-term health effects that Perfluorooctane Sulfonate acid (PFOS) has on water and food. According to epidemiological studies, exposure to the substance will lead to adverse effects including defects during fetal development, tissue damage, and thyroid damage.

Communities that are located nearby these factory plants have likely consumed the contaminated water, exposing residents to these harmful compounds. To reduce the exposure of the chemicals, public health officials suggest that water systems be carefully monitored and managed with a filtered water system. Further studies need to be done to understand the relationship between the two chemicals and the general population. In order to know the long-term effects of Perfluorooctanoic acid and Perfluorooctane Sulfonate acid has on the human body, researchers must examine the origins of each water source and the nearby communities.

== EPA regulations ==
On March 19, 2016, the EPA posted health advisories about the two chemicals PFOA and PFOS. According to the new health advisories, a combined level of 70 parts per trillion for both PFOA and PFOS is said to be hazardous and has the potential to impact health negatively. This new value is a relatively significant increase from previous levels that were believed to be safe. In 2009, a level of 0.04 parts per billion of PFOA and PFOS was considered to be a potential hazard for drinking water by the EPA. In 2012, the EPA passed the Third Unregulated Contaminant Monitoring Rule (UCMR 3). The UCMR was initiated as a result of the Safe Drinking Water Act, as changes in 1996 required the EPA to provide a list of unregulated water contaminants that should begin to be monitored. PFOA and PFOS were both listed in the UCMR 3, making public water systems in the United States to have to begin testing the chemical levels of PFOA and PFOS along with the other chemicals listed. While the new health advisories have been released by the EPA in 2016, there are currently no enforceable standards regarding national regulations. As stated by the EPA, health advisories are mainly intended to give information about the chemicals in question and allow further research to take place before more action is taken.

In February 2017, the Trump administration reportedly began looking into shutting down the Office of Enforcement & Compliance Assurance (OECA), which is a division of the EPA that works to enforce multiple federal laws including the Safe Drinking Water Act. On March 8, 2017, New York senators drafted new legislation that would require the EPA to amend the Safe Drinking Water Act and have it set more strict levels for compounds such as PFOA and PFOS. The senators and its supporters hope that it will pass through the Senate and that the Trump Administration will approve of it. In the House of Representatives, several legislators are also pushing for the military to be responsible for cleaning up some PFOA and PFOS pollution from various military locations across the nation. Despite the proposed budget cuts to the EPA by the Trump administration, PFOA and PFOS research is still being done by the Strategic Environmental Research and Development Program and the Environmental Security Technology Certification Program, programs funded by the Department of Defense.

== Impacts on residents ==
The toxic substances had contaminated the drinking water of nearby counties. After collecting various blood samples from Morgan County and Lawrence County, the state of Alabama was under investigation for water contamination. Although the levels of PFOA and PFOS were found in low concentrations, warnings were released indicating that prolonged exposure to these pollutants can cause serious health problems. In order to remove these pollutants from drinking water, the EPA recommends that unconventional methods such as Activated carbon filtering or high-pressure membrane filtering must be used, demonstrating the extra precautions residents must take. The investigation explained how individuals went through a similar problem with water contamination in the past, yet there were still no signs of long-term health effects regarding the contaminated water. The recommendation of installing an activated carbon filter or a high pressure membrane filter as a method to get rid of the PFOA/PFOS pollution in the water are not commonly used methods to treat water. A proposed $4 million activated carbon filtration system by the water authority would be a temporary solution until a larger reverse osmosis treatment plant could be built. In addition, citizens are also concern over the cost and the lack of access to resources and the proposed solution. Due to differing responses from government officials and water authority officials and lack of expertise regarding PFOA/PFOS pollution, there is confusion among citizens regarding what is the best course of action.

=== Lawrence County ===
Lawrence County, Alabama, a county in North Alabama was affected by the release of PFOA and PFOS into their main source of water. Although the Water and Sewer Authority affected belongs to East Lawrence and West Morgan counties, the West Lawrence Water Co-op also uses water from the authority's system. Because of this, all of Lawrence county has been affected by the contamination in drinking water. There is a diverse background of those affected by the water contamination. The percentage of people whose race was white alone in Alabama in 2015 was 77.1%, whereas the percentage in Lawrence County, Alabama was 78.2%. Lawrence County was 11.2% Black or African-American alone, 5.8% Native American, 2.2% Hispanic or Latino alone, and 0.2% Asian alone in 2015. The entire state of Alabama was 13.3% Black or African American alone, 1.2% Native American, 17.6% Hispanic or Latino alone, and 5.6% Asian alone. The median income for Lawrence County in 2015 was $40,003, and the persons in poverty were 18.7%. The median income of Alabama in 2015 was $53, 889, and the person in poverty were 13.5%.

=== Morgan County ===
Morgan County, Alabama, is another Northern Alabama County affected by PFOA and PFOS pollution in the drinking water. The West Morgan-East Lawrence Water Authority, which services parts of both Morgan and Lawrence counties, was one of the main water facilities cited as potentially having a water pollution issue. The manufacturing company 3M is believed to have contributed to the pollution as a result of activity at a Decatur, a city in Morgan County, manufacturing plant. According to 2015 data, the annual income for Morgan households was $45,751 compared to $53,889 for the state of Alabama. In Morgan, 16.1% of individuals are below the poverty level compared to 13.5% of individuals in the state.

=== Environmental groups ===
Since the EPA health advisory, two environmental groups have been working with citizens of both Lawrence and Morgan to help resolve the pollution issue. The group Tennessee Riverkeeper filed a lawsuit on February 15, 2017, against the company 3M, seeking to make 3M among other groups responsible for the clean-up and resolution of the PFOA and PFOS pollution. The group New York Environmental Law & Justice Project is currently working with Lawrence and Morgan community groups to raise public knowledge of the issue and work towards a resolution, potentially through legal action.

== State Government and policy response ==
If water systems are not properly monitored, PFOA and PFOS from nearby industrial sites that use or manufacture the chemicals can spread into the water. Due to the state's budget cut, the amount of funding has declined over the years, and thus there is not enough financial support to enable strict water inspections in the area. The water division stated their intent to try running an environmental program that will enforce better water plans. In the meantime, the West Morgan East Lawrence Water and Sewer Authority is currently working on a new and improved filtration system, which is set to be finished in 2019.

According to the Alabama state Governor Robert Bentley, the water issues that predominated in Lawrence and Morgan Counties were nothing to worry about. Companies had warned neighboring communities their history of releasing chemicals into the local water system, and the EPA released a statement warning people about the tested, unsafe level of pollutants in the water. Despite these warnings, Governor Robert Bentley still refused to acknowledge the problem. However, some of the residents in these counties are scared and will continue to avoid the water since there could very well be a health risk involved. The contamination of the water has taken an emotional toll on some of the residents in the area, explaining how companies that moved into the area have been ruining their neighborhood. There are inconsistent responses from both the government and the water department. The general manager of the water department, Don Sims, released a statement regarding the dangers of the water and warned citizens to avoid drinking it; however, Sims was criticized by the EPA and government officials for releasing the statement. As a result of miscommunication and a lack of definitive answers from officials, citizens of both Lawrence and Morgan are unsure of what the best solution to this pollution issue.

== Companies' responses ==
=== 3M water contamination lawsuit ===
The 3M manufacturing company, located in Decatur, was shown to be the major producer of both PFOS and PFOA. 3M has responded to the water contamination as harmless to the human body since those materials are commonly found in people. Although many individuals have filed complaints regarding the issue, 3M stated how:

its own employees who worked in close contact with the substances have not shown increased risk of health problems and the presence of these substances in the environment is not necessarily harmful.

In 2002, 3M had voluntarily phased out production of the chemicals due to the various lawsuit from other companies. Also, the EPA had suggested an alternative plan for the water contamination thus they suggest the state to replace the water system with a carbon filter within the water system. Following the new EPA health advisory from March 2016, the West Morgan East Lawrence Water Authority filed a lawsuit against 3M, arguing that the company is at fault for the pollution and potential health risks. Representatives of 3M believe that the company has done its part to work with agencies such as the EPA to handle the situation and thus think the suit is unwarranted.

Along with 3M Co, Daikin and its subsidiary Dyneon LLC got sued for its water contamination in the Tennessee River. According to the West Morgan-East Lawrence Water and Sewer Authority, Daikin settled its portion of the lawsuit by paying $5 million involving with the water contamination containing PFOA and PFOS. The settlement consisted of $3.9 million going into the water's authority's temporary filtration system and $450,000 will be divided amongst the water systems in the state. In relations to the settlement, Daikin admitted that they did no wrong in the disposal of the chemicals and customers are reimbursed for their water bills during the "do-not-drink warning" period. Although the lawsuit has been ongoing for a while, the EPA issued a health advisory on May 19, 2016, to advised women of childbearing age to not use the drinking water.

== Related incidents ==
=== Decatur, Alabama ===
The high levels of PFOA and PFOS detected in 2016 was not the first incident of PFOA and PFOS pollution in the area. In 2007, the EPA decided to test the water in Decatur, Alabama, a part of Morgan County, due to industrial activity linked to the production of PFOA and PFOS of the companies 3M, Daikin America, and Toray Carbon Fibers America. The levels of PFOS and PFOA in the West Morgan-East Lawrence water system was determined to be below the current EPA acceptable levels (which were 0.4 parts per billion for PFOA and 0.2 parts per billion for PFOS). Despite the tests showing the water was safe, blood tests revealed that residents in Decatur had slightly elevated blood serum levels of PFOA and PFOS, which is something the EPA wanted to monitor.

=== Parkersburg, West Virginia ===
Parkersburg is on average a low-income community, with a median household income of $31,876 compared to $41,751 for the state of West Virginia. Parkersburg is also more impoverished compared to the state, with 24.3% of Parkersburg residents being below the poverty line compared to 18.0% for the state. In 2004, blood tests revealed higher than average concentrations of PFOA in blood serum in residents of Parkersburg, West Virginia. A DuPont Teflon producing plant operated near Parkersburg, and that plant has been identified as the likely source. It was discovered that the DuPont plant had contaminated the local water supply with perfluorooctanoic (PFOA) acid thus residents in the area are advised to drink filtered water for the time being. For decades, studies have suggested that PFOA has been linked to many drinking water supplies and other fluorochemical-containing consumer products which can cause health problems.

=== Hoosick Falls, New York ===
Hoosick Falls is a low-income community based on census data, with the median household income being $52,045 and that of the state of New York being $59,269. That being said, Hoosick Falls has a lower percentage of individuals that live below the poverty level compared to the state as a whole, with 10.9% of Hoosick Falls residents being in poverty and 15.7% of the state's residents. Hoosick Falls is a town located in New York where half of the population was seen to be exposed to water contamination. In January 2016, the EPA recommended that residents of Hoosick Falls use bottled water after finding traces of PFOA in the water supplies. The pollution was discovered in both public and private water supplies, and it is believed that facilities of the companies Saint-Gobain Performance Plastics and Honeywell International are the sources. The two companies were held responsible for the exposure of PFOA, thus they offered a settlement of over $1 million to cover the cost of the water contamination. While the settlement is still ongoing, a municipal activated-carbon filtration system has been installed and can be used by owners of private wells, but government officials still call upon the companies to pay for cleaning up the pollution and provided Hoosick Falls residents with clean drinking water.

=== North Bennington, Vermont ===
With a median household income of $47,228 compared to $55,176 for the state, North Bennington is considered a low-income community of Vermont. A higher percentage of North Bennington residents are in poverty when compared to the state of Vermont as a whole, as 16.9% of North Bennington residents live below the poverty line compared to 11.5% of the state. Following the discovery of PFOA pollution in nearby Hoosick Falls, New York, the village of North Bennington, Vermont, found varying levels of PFOA contamination in the water supply and multiple private wells. Facilities of the company Chemfab have been identified as the likely sources, and the Vermont Department of Health has offered blood tests for North Bennington residents since the levels of PFOA were higher than the department's health advisory level of 20 parts per trillion. The state and multiple agencies are continuing to look into the matter and determine the best course of action for the residents living in these communities.

=== New Jersey public water systems ===
In 2006, the New Jersey Department of Environmental Protection conducted a study to see if there were PFOA and PFOS contamination in the state's public water systems. The researchers chose to only include water systems that were near facilities that either produced or used PFOA and PFOS. Of the 23 systems tested, 65% contained PFOA and 30% contained PFOS. In September 2016, PFOA and PFOS contaminants were detected in the waters of Merrimack County. Merrimack County is on average a low-income community with a median household income of $65,983 compared to $72,093 for the state. Starting in January 2017, Ocean and Burlington's counties have called for testing for PFOA and PFOS in the water. Ocean County has a median household income of $61,994, and 11.3% of Ocean residents live below the poverty level compared to 10.8% for the state. Burlington, on the other hand, is not a low-income community with a median household income of $78,621 and 6.4% of residents living in poverty.

== See also ==
- Drinking water quality in the United States
- Hinkley groundwater contamination
- Lead contamination in Washington, D.C. drinking water
- Flint water crisis
