= Lead service line =

Pipe used to connect water main to users

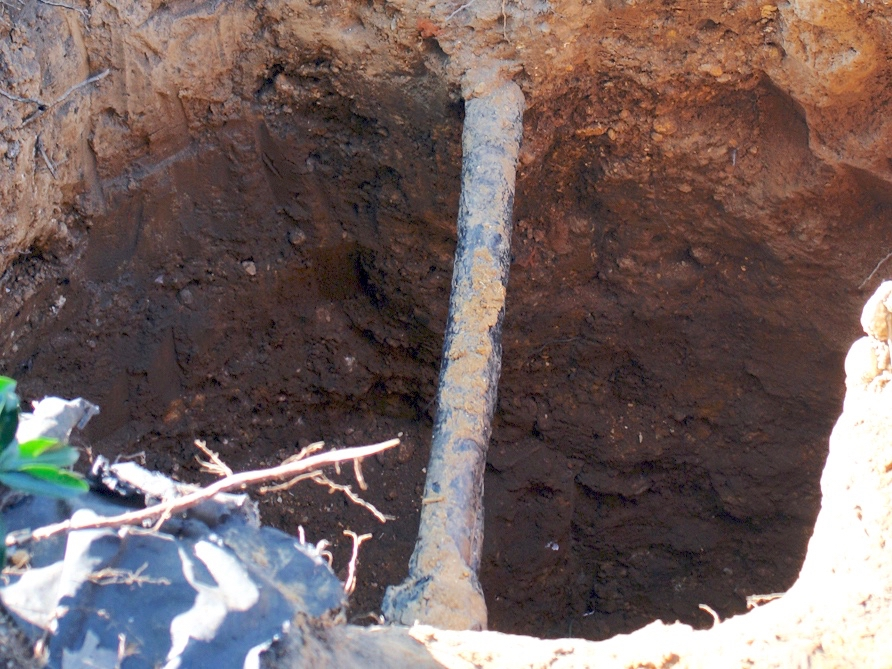
Lead service line in Washington, D.C.

A lead service line (LSL, also known as lead service pipe, and lead connection pipe) is a pipe made of lead which is used in potable water distribution to connect a water main to a user's premises.

Lead exposure is a public health hazard as it causes developmental effects in fetuses, infants, and young children. It also has other health effects in adults. According to the World Health Organization, the presence of lead service lines is the most significant contributor of lead contamination in drinking water in many countries.

The most certain way to eliminate lead exposure in drinking water from the lead service lines is to replace them with pipes made from other materials. However, replacement is time-consuming and costly. The difficulty is exacerbated in many locations by ownership structure with a shared responsibility between water utilities and property owners, which requires cooperation between the two entities. Some water utilities employ corrosion control as a short-term solution while working through long-term replacement projects. A potential issue with corrosion control is constant monitoring of its effectiveness. There have been widespread lead exposures resulting from failures of corrosion control, such as the Flint water crisis.

== Use of lead piping ==
Lead had been associated with plumbing since the ancient times. The chemical symbol for lead (Pb) is derived from the Latin word plumbum, which means 'waterworks' or 'plumbing', as the Ancient Roman water system used lead pipes. Lead water lines have also been known to be harmful since ancient times. Lead pipes were preferred over iron pipes because they lasted longer and were more flexible.

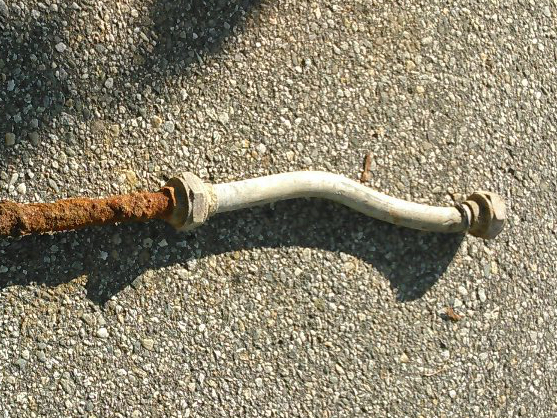
Lead gooseneck connected to a steel pipe

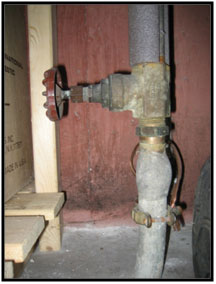
Lead service line connected to residential plumbing

In modern times, lead was still widely used in water distribution systems and plumbing hardware before the early 20th century, including lead pipes, leaded solder and leaded alloys. One part of the system is the connections between the water mains and the water user locations. A service line is a pipe that makes the connection, which was also made of lead in those days. The first portion of the service line is called a gooseneck, which connects to a valve at the water main and is required to be flexible to allow some movement. Lead goosenecks (also called lead service connections or LSCs) were commonly used in the past due to their durability and flexibility. In colder-weather areas, the connection between the water main and the rest of the service line is subjected to expansion and contraction during temperature changes. When stiffer service lines made of galvanized steel pipe were used, lead goosenecks were installed to connect to the water main to reduce breakage from such expansion and contraction.

From the mid-1800s to the early 1900s, many communities started to realize the health risks of lead and began to phase out some lead-containing products. In Australia, the use of lead service lines was restricted in the 1930s, while other countries still continued the practice of using lead service lines decades later. An example is the United States, where lead service lines were allowed until the 1980s. Not only were they allowed, but some parts of the United States mandated the use of lead service lines until 1987, primarily due to lobbying by lead manufacturers and plumbing unions. This resulted in as many as 3.3 million lead service lines and 6.4 million lead goosenecks in the country. In England and Wales, there were about 8.9 million homes with lead service lines as of 1997.

In the 2010s, one-third of American communities still had lead service lines, with an estimate of up to six million. Elimination has been extremely difficult due to the high cost of identifying, locating, removing, and preventing the many potential sources of lead in various water distribution systems in the United States.

== Mechanism of contamination ==
While pipes are made of elemental lead, which is insoluble in water, exposure to water and air causes pipes to corrode. This forms a layer of soluble scale composed of various Pb^{2+} or Pb^{4+} compounds, principally cerussite (PbCO_{3}), hydrocerussite (Pb_{3}(CO_{3})_{2}(OH)_{2}), plumbonacrite (Pb_{10}(CO_{3})_{6}(OH)_{6}O), litharge (PbO), and plattnerite (PbO_{2}).

Once scale is present, its stability is primarily affected by water chemistry, including pH, alkalinity, hardness, redox potential and temperature. The oxidation of lead by anions is affected by redox potential, as well as the concentrations of specific anions. While some anions, such as chloride (Cl^{-}) or orthophosphate (PO_{4}^{3-}), can precipitate lead out of solution, others dissolve lead by forming complexes, so the relative concentrations of different ions may affect total dissolved lead. Furthermore, some of the most important anions which react with lead, including carbonate (CO_{3}^{2-}), orthophosphate (PO_{4}^{3-}) and sulfate (SO_{4}^{2-}), also undergo acid-base reactions, so their concentrations are affected by pH and alkalinity, the ability of the water to resist changes to pH. The presence of cations such as Ca^{2+} and Mg^{2+} can also decrease the availability of relevant anions. Finally, for some complexes, particularly lead chloride, temperature can affect solubility.

== Health effects ==
Lead exposure, even at low levels, can cause neurological effects, especially in young children, young women, and developing fetuses. In fetuses, lead in the mother's bones is released along with calcium during fetal bone formation. Lead can also cross the placental barrier into the fetus, which can cause premature birth, growth issues, and death of the fetus. Lead can be passed from the mother through breastfeeding. In children, the effects of lead exposure include learning problems, slow growth, and lower IQ. In adults, low-level exposure can cause hypertension, cognitive issues, and reproductive harm.

== Regulations ==
The World Health Organization (WHO) published the first edition of Guidelines for Drinking-water Quality (GDWQ) in 1984 to replace the 1970 European Standards for Drinking-Water and 1971 International Standards for Drinking-Water. The publication recommended the limits of contaminants in drinking water which set the value for lead to not more than 0.05 mg/L based on assumptions about various sources of lead intake and the provisional tolerable weekly intake of 3 mg of lead per adult that was established by the Joint FAO/WHO Expert Committee on Food Additives (JECFA) in 1972. However, no safe levels had been defined. In 1986, JECFA updated the provisional tolerable weekly intake level of lead for infants and children to be based on body weight, at 25 micrograms of lead per kilogram of body weight. JECFA reconfirmed this provisional tolerable value and extended the same value to all age groups in 1993. When WHO published the second edition of GDWQ in 1996, it based it on the new JECFA value assuming 50% of lead exposure from drinking water and a 5-kg infant consuming 0.75 liters of water from bottles per day, and infants are in the most sensitive subgroup. Therefore, WHO established the guideline value of lead concentration in drinking water not to exceed 0.01 mg/L.

=== Argentina ===
As of early 2020 Argentina has set a standard of 0.05 mg/L based on Resolution no. 523/95-MTSS, which is an amendment of law 19587.

=== Australia ===
In 2004, Australia lowered the lead exposure limit to 0.01 mg/L from 0.05 through the 2004 Australian Drinking Water Guidelines. However, this is a guideline, not a mandatory standard.

=== European Union ===
On 3 November 1998, the European Union adopted Directive 98/83/EC to set standards for drinking water. This included a plan to lower the lead contamination in the water distribution systems of member states. The Directive sets the maximum lead concentration in drinking water at 0.025 mg/L by 2003, and 0.01 by 2013.

A study in 1999 gave an estimate of the percentage of lead service lines in some European countries. Ireland, the United Kingdom, France, Portugal, and Belgium all had higher percentages of lead lines ranging between 15% and 51%. Germany, Spain, Italy, Luxembourg, and the Netherlands had between 3% and 9%, while Denmark and Greece had less than 1%.

Approaches to reduce lead exposure in water distribution systems to meet that goal have also differed. For example, the United Kingdom took the short- and medium-term strategy of dosing the water with orthophosphate as a corrosion-control measure and considered lead service line replacement as the long-term strategy. By 2010 (three years before the new lower standard), 95% of public water supplies were treated with orthophosphate. The tests had 99.8% compliance with the 2003 0.025 mg/L standard and 99.0% compliance with the 2013 0.01 mg/L standard. However, many other European countries considered the practice of adding orthophosphate to the water supply to be undesirable, as it would result in sewage with higher concentrations of nutrient. That could potentially create problems of harmful algal blooms. An example of a country that took another approach was Germany. The southern part of Germany had prohibited lead pipes since the early 1900s. However, northern Germany continued to use lead pipes until the 1970s. Germany's approach to meet the new standard was to focus on the removal of lead service lines. Water utilities in northern Germany had already been working on lead service line replacements since the adoption of the Directive in order to meet the 2003 standard.

=== Canada ===
In 1992, the federal government set the guideline to have the Maximum Allowable Concentration (MAC) of lead in drinking water at 0.01 mg/L. On 8 March 2019, Health Canada updated the guideline to lower the MAC of lead to 0.005 mg/L, one of the lowest values in the world. Regulation of these guidelines is performed at the provincial level, and is inconsistent.

On 4 November 2019, Concordia University published a year-long study which found that one-third of water samples from 11 major Canadian cities tested higher for MAC of lead than the national guideline, with the highest levels recorded from samples in Montreal, Prince Rupert, and Regina. It was also found that some municipalities only had estimates on the number of lead service lines still in use, with no exact data available.

=== United States ===
The "Lead and Copper Rule Improvements" regulation, issued by the United States Environmental Protection Agency (EPA) in October 2024, specifies an "action level" for lead at 0.010 mg/L. A public water system is required to monitor its water supply at customer locations. If more than 10% of tap water samples exceed the lead action level (or the copper action level of 1.3 ppm), the supplier must take additional steps to control corrosion. Other actions may include installation of treatment, checking of source water, removal of lead-containing plumbing, and public education. The 2024 regulation also requires public water systems to remove all lead pipes within ten years.

=== Uruguay ===
Uruguay set the lead exposure of drinking water to 0.05 mg/L in 2000 through Decree 315/94, 2nd edition. It also banned lead water pipes and fittings in 2004. The country set new standards in 2011 through Decree 375/11 to lowered exposure level to 0.03 mg/L and to achieve 0.01 mg/L level by 2021.

== Replacements ==
=== Responsibilities ===
There are two parts in a service line. The first part is the pipe that connects the water main to the curb stop which is a stop valve that is located around the street curb or the property line. That first section is called communication pipe. The second part is the pipe that connects the curb stop to the building inlet or a water meter. This part is called supply pipe. Depending on local water utilities, the meter may be located at the property line instead. When the water meter is located at that alternative position, the pipe section that connects the water main to the water meter is the communication pipe, and the section that connects the water meter to the building isolation valve is the supply pipe. Lead service lines can exist in one of these scenarios: the communication pipe section can be made of lead, called the lead communication pipe; the supply pipe section can be made of lead, called the lead supply pipe; the entire length can be made out of lead; or only a small section of the communication pipe at the water main is made out of lead (lead gooseneck).

The ownership structure of service lines varies among water utilities. Depending on localities, the entire length of a service line from the water main to the building inlet may be owned by the water utility, or the property owner. There can also be a partial ownership scenario where the water utility and the property owner share ownership of the service line, thus, replacing the entire lead service line requires a cooperation between the two entities. In the shared ownership, the water utility typically owns the communication pipe and the curb stop, and property owner owns the supply pipe. In this scenario, when the water utility owned section of a lead service line is called public lead service line, and the section owned by the property owner is called private lead service line. When only one part of a lead service line (either public or private) is replaced, it is called partial lead service line replacement. When both sides are replaced at the same time, it is called full lead service line replacement.

Where there is involvement with private ownership, it complicates a full lead service line replacement. A major issue is the cost of the replacement. In the United States, a replacement can cost between $3,000 to $5,000 (2018 estimate) for the private side. This can be a major financial burden for homeowners. Even with incentives such as interest-free loans, or using ratepayer money to cover part of the cost, homeowners are still hesitant. Using ratepayer money to fund private lead service line replacements in itself is a subject of debate. Those who advocate for it argue that the benefits to public health outweigh a small increase in water rates that impacts everyone. On the other side, there is a concern that the increased rates can cause hardship, and there is a public policy question on using ratepayer money to make private property improvements.

Even in the case that private lead service line replacements are fully funded at no cost to property owners, some owners still refuse to allow their water utility to do work on their property for various reasons, such as fearing property damage or not wanting workers inside. For example, in Pittsburgh, 10% of property owners refused no-cost replacement of private lead service lines. This problem is exacerbated in rental properties where tenants have no authority to accept the offer, and landlords do not see the value of the investment. For cities with a large amount of renters, it is difficult to complete a full lead service line replacement program without any forms of mandate through a local ordinance. Alternately, some common law jurisdictions may have enough legal precedent in regard to public nuisance law. Courts may allow municipalities to access private property to address the public health threat without having to obtain permission from the property owner.

=== Partial replacements ===
A partial lead service line replacement involves replacing only one portion of a service line (whether the public or private portion) and leaving the other portion intact. This practice does not completely remove the lead source. Additionally, studies have found that a partial lead service line replacement can cause short-term elevation of lead concentration due to the disturbance during the replacement. An advisory board of the United States Environmental Protection Agency concluded in 2011 that they had enough data to show that such practice could pose a public health risk. An advisory committee of the Centers for Disease Control and Prevention agreed with that position. Therefore, partial lead service line replacement should be avoided. In 2014, the American Water Works Association published a communication guideline with a definition of a partial lead service line replacement to include a repair and a reconnection to a lead service line. It recommended that the entire lead service line should be replaced. It also provided guidance on homeowner notification before partial replacements and water utilities' commitment to follow-up tests. In 2017, a study of the Canadian House of Commons Standing Committee on Transport, Infrastructure and Communities concurred that partial replacements can aggravate the problem of lead exceedances.

=== Full replacements ===
A full lead service line replacement involves replacing the entire service line from the water main to the building inlet. This includes the public and the private portions of the line. A full lead service line replacement should be coordinated with the property owner as it may involve obstacles such as trees, driveways, and walls. Sometime, there is a need to break through the customer's basement wall.

Although a full lead service line replacement is the preferred method, it is not risk-free. There is a short-term elevation of lead concentration, but it tends to release less lead and for a shorter period of time. Research has found that even with a full lead service line replacement, lead exposure can still exist in the home, particularly when the water source is rich in manganese and iron, which cause scale build-up in the home's pipes. The scale may have absorbed lead from prior to the replacement; when the scale crumbles after the replacement, lead can be carried to the tap in particulate form, which may continue for years. Therefore, flushing of internal plumbing is still required after a full lead service line replacement.

=== Post-replacement flushing procedures ===
After work done on or near a lead service line, whether a partial or full replacement or other disturbances, such as changing the water meter, the water utility should perform a flushing procedure to remove lead that has been lodged in the building's plumbing. The homeowner should not use any water filter devices, use hot water or ice makers, or consume tap water until the flushing procedure is completed. For the procedure, the water utility performs an initial flush after the work is done. Then the worker starts from the lowest floor and opens all cold-water taps, showers and bathtub faucets throughout the home. Faucet aerators are removed during the procedure. At the top floor where the last tap is open, the worker waits for 30 minutes, then starts turning off the tap and puts the faucet aerators back in place from the top floor on down.

=== Replacement progress ===
Lead exposure in drinking water that is caused by lead service lines can be mitigated in the short term by using corrosion control techniques. However, the only long-term solution is to completely replace the lead lines with other materials. Below is a partial list of replacement efforts by water utilities around the world:

Partial list of lead service line replacement efforts

Country	Community / water utility	Estimated total LSLs	Target completion date	Replaced LSLs	Date of estimation / report	Replacement progress
Belgium	Brussels	not known	not known	46,558	2018	Total of 46,558 LSLs replaced between 2003 and 2018. However, the replacements had been stalled since 2010 with only 373 LSL replacements in 2018.
Canada	Edmonton, Alberta	4,815	not known	1,895	2018	EPCOR Utilities removed 1,895 lead service lines between 2008 and 2018. At the end of 2018, there were 2,920 homes with lead service lines.
Canada	Halifax, Nova Scotia	2,500 public; 10,000 private	2050	not known	2017	In 2017, Nova Scotia Utility and Review Board approved the plan for Halifax Water to replace 2,500 public LSLs and 10,000 private LSLs with grant component that reimburses 25% of private LSL replacement cost to property owners.
Canada	Montreal, Quebec	69,000	2036	8,000	August 2016	Montreal started the replacement projects in 2006 and completed 8,000 replacements in 2016. The city increased the funding in 2016 to target 5,000 replacements per year for the next 20 years.
Canada	Toronto, Ontario	65,000	not known	40,000 approx. (mostly partial)	June 2019	In 2007, the city estimated to have 65,000 LSLs on the public portion. There had been replacement and the remaining public LSLs had been reduced to 38,000 in 2014 and 25,771 in 2018.
France	Paris	66,000	2009 (completed)	66,000 (partial)	2009	Paris water companies replaced all 66,000 public side LSLs (lead communication pipes) between 1999 and 2009.
Germany	Northern part of Germany	not known	2003 (completed)	not known	2013	Water utilities in Germany completed their public LSL replacements when the new water quality standard started in 2003. Private LSLs and internal lead pipes were not completely removed as of 2013.
Ireland	country wide	not known	not known	22,000 (partial, incl. 800 full)	April 2019	As of April 2019, Irish Water replaced 22,000 public LSLs. It also coordinated with property owners to do full LSL replacements, however, only about 800 were full replacements. There were State grants that was set up in 2016 to encourage property owners to do the private portion along with the public portion, but only 71 properties were approved for the grants in 3 years.
Netherlands	Amsterdam	13,000	2000 (completed)	13,000	2000	Amsterdam used contractors to replace 13,000 lead pipes in old city districts between 1995 and 2000.
United Kingdom	Northern Ireland	92,400	not known	21,972 (partial incl. 3,059 full)	2018	Northern Ireland Water replaced 8,150 public LSLs (lead communication pipes) between 2005 and 2014 based on three factors: water quality sample failures, notifications from customers of voluntary LSL replacements on the private side, and LSLs affected by water main work. In 2014, the utility added the focus on proactive replacements in LSL hotspot areas which were based on multiple factors that contribute to the probability of LSL occurrences. The utility committed £1 million each year for the next 6 years in the pricing control plan of 2015 (PC15). The goal for the first 6 years was to replace 12,976 LSLs at the cost of £6.4 million. If it continues the commitment, the following six years will have 12,322 LSL replacements at the cost of £6.1 million. This proactive plan brought the public LSL replacements to 3,729, 3,322. 4,311, and 2,460 for reporting years 2014–15, 2015–16, 2016–17, and 2017–18 respectively.
United States	Flint, Michigan	10,500+	2020	8,000	April 2019	After the Flint water crisis started in 2014, Michigan settled a lawsuit in 2017 with $97 million budget to replace all lead or galvanized steel service lines in 3 years. About 28,000 homes were suspected of having lead or galvanized steel service lines. As of March 2019, contractors excavated 21,000 sites, they found and replaced 8,000 lead or galvanized steel service lines. A computer model was used to identify the next batch of excavations. It is estimated that 2,500 more lead or galvanized steel service lines will be found and replaced.
United States	Framingham, Massachusetts	15	2016 (completed)	15	2016	Between 2004 and 2016, Town of Framingham inspected 184 service lines and found 15 lead service lines. The town performed the full replacement in all LSLs in 2016.
United States	Lansing, Michigan	12,150	December 2016 (completed)	12,150	December 2016	In 2004, the Lansing Board of Water & Light started the full LSL replacement program. In Lansing, the water utility owns services from the main to the meter. It completed the project in December 2016 with 12,150 replacements.
United States	Madison, Wisconsin	8,000	2011 (completed)	8,000	2011	The City of Madison performed 8,000 full LSL replacements between 2001 and 2011. To ensure that the city can complete the full replacements, it enacted an ordinance requiring the private side to be replaced with cost sharing with its water utility.
United States	Medford, Oregon	27	2017 (completed)	27	2017	While the Medford Water Commission did not believe that there were any LSLs in its system, it began the search for lead goosenecks that might be connected to galvanized pipes. The search began on 20 June 2016, and by 18 January 2017, twenty-seven lead goosenecks were found out of 4,770 meter boxes that were inspected. All 27 lead goosenecks along with the galvanized pipes were replaced with new copper service lines.
United States	Newark, New Jersey	18,720	April 2022	1,485	October 2019	After Newark's corrosion control failed, causing a widespread lead exposure, the city aimed to do full LSL replacements for all residents. In October 2019, the city estimated that it had 18,720 LSLs and planned to use a $120 million bond from Essex County to replace them in 24 to 30 months.
United States	New Jersey (statewide)	350,000	2029	not known	October 2019	Governor Phil Murphy set a goal for a statewide full LSL replacement program within 10 years through the use of $500 million bond and water rate increases to fund the program. This requires voter approval and legislation, however.
United States	Sioux Falls, South Dakota	230	August 2017 (completed)	230	August 2017	The City of Sioux Falls performed 230 LSL replacements. All LSLs were removed in August 2017.
United States	Spokane, Washington	486	July 2018 (completed)	486	July 2018	The City of Spokane started the full LSL replacement project in May 2016 at no cost to homeowners. It completed all 486 replacements in July 2018.
United States	Springfield, Massachusetts	not known	November 2005 (completed)	not known	November 2005	The Springfield Water and Sewer Commission had been replacing LSLs since 1992. It completed the replacement of the last known LSL in November 2005.
United States	Washington, DC	35,000	not known	20,000 approx. (mostly partial)	April 2019	Between 2004 and 2008, DC Water replaced 19,100 LSLs. Out of those, only 1,900 were full LSL replacements. In 2008, DC Water significantly changed the replacement program to one based on water main replacements only. This meant that for most of the years between 2009 and 2017, there were less than 500 replacements each year. As of 2019, there were still 19,103 sites of known LSLs to be replaced.

== Mitigation ==
While full lead service line replacement is the permanent solution, such undertaking takes years or decades. Water utilities and customers need to use other strategies to mitigate the lead exposure risks in the short term.

=== Internal corrosion control ===
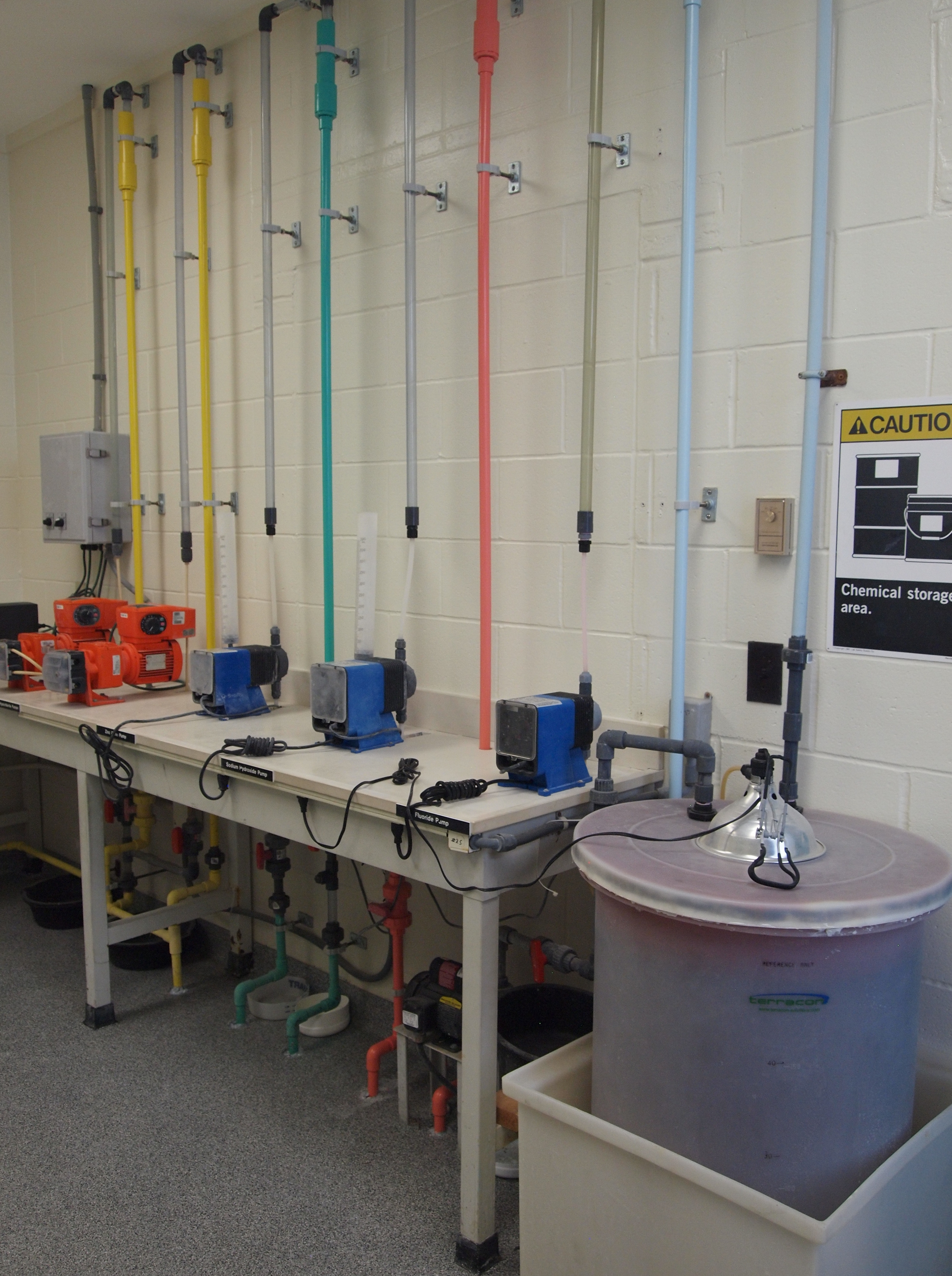
Corrosion inhibitor added by a pump at a water purification plant

Various techniques can be used by water utilities to control internal corrosion, for example, pH level adjustment, adjustment of carbonate and calcium to create calcium carbonate as a piping surface coating, and applying a corrosion inhibitor. Corrosion inhibitors include phosphate products, such as orthophosphate, used to form films over pipes. This reduces the chance of trace metals including lead leaching from the pipe materials into the water. Another type of corrosion inhibitor includes silicate products. However, the mechanism of film forming and its effectiveness are not well understood.

=== Flushing ===
For a home with a lead service line, the American Water Works Association recommends homeowners do a morning flush by running the water at the kitchen tap for 3–5 minutes. The amount of required flushing may be longer if the house is far back from the curb, which would have a longer lead service line. In order to conserve water, showering and flushing the toilet can also be used. However, those alternative activities will not flush the line at the kitchen, where it is the main tap for water consumption. An additional flushing at the kitchen tap for 30–45 seconds is recommended.

=== Filters ===
In certain cases when flushing is not practical, such as having a very long lead service line, using filters may be considered. When choosing filters, water consumers should select the products that remove total lead that includes filtering of dissolved lead and lead particles. In United States, it is recommended that the filters are certified according to American National Standard Institute/National Science Foundation Standard 53.

== Widespread hazards and causes ==
There have been a number incidents, with various causes, of widespread lead contamination in drinking water related to lead service lines.

=== Changing of water source ===
In 2014, the Flint water crisis was caused by changing the water source from the Detroit Water and Sewerage Department's treated water to the Flint River, treated locally in Flint. The treated Flint River water changed the water properties in Flint's distribution system in three areas. First, corrosion inhibitor was not added to the treated water. Secondly, the pH level decreased over time. Thirdly, the chloride level was higher than treated Detroit's water. The combination of these factors contributed to the corrosiveness of the water, causing corrosion to lead and iron pipes. The solution was to change the water source back to Detroit's water supply and replace 30,000 lead service lines.

=== Changing of disinfection chemical ===
In 2000, lead contamination in Washington, D.C.'s drinking water was caused by changing the water treatment disinfection chemical from chlorine to monochloramine. This was done as a measure to limit disinfection byproducts according to a new regulation from the United States Environmental Protection Agency. The change inadvertently reduced the protective mineral coating properties in the water, causing the scaling – which had been covering the interior surface of the lead service lines for decades – to be reduced to the point that it allowed lead to leach into the water. The solution was to replace all 23,000 lead service lines. However, 15,000 of those were done as partial replacements, which was found to be ineffective.

=== Changing of corrosion control chemical ===
In 2014, the Pittsburgh water crisis was caused by unauthorized switching of the anti-corrosion agent from soda ash to caustic soda. The city had been using soda ash for decades as a corrosion control chemical. Soda ash's alkalinity helps the metals to be less corrosive. It also leaves a solid residue which encourages mineral buildup as a protective layer within the interior surface of the pipes. Although caustic soda has similar alkalinity, it does not help in buildup creation. After switching the corrosion control chemical, the buildup in the city's distribution system started to disappear, causing leaching in the lead service lines. The short-term solution was to use orthophosphate to create coating. The long-term solution was to do full lead service line replacements. The city started the replacements in 2016. By 2019, 4,200 lead service lines had been replaced. The same year, the city budgeted $49 million to replace another 4,400 public service lines and offer no-cost private line replacements at the same time.

=== Adjustment of pH levels ===
In 2016, water in Newark, New Jersey, began to have elevated lead levels. A year earlier, the city tried to adjust the pH levels in order to control carcinogens in the system. The result of higher acidity caused the sodium silicate that was used successfully as a corrosion inhibitor for two decades to stop working. It took the city until 2018 to find a short-term solution, switching to using orthophosphate, but it would take another six months to become effective. Water bottles and water filters were distributed as a stop-gap. The long-term solution was for the city to do 18,000 full lead service line replacements. The city took unprecedented steps by borrowing $120 million to shorten the replacement timeframe to three years from ten years, and working with legislators on a law allowing the city to replace the private portion of the lines free of charge and without any permission from property owners.

=== Physical disturbances ===
In Chicago, after Mayor Rahm Emanuel took office in 2011, he initiated a $481 million water conservation initiative that included household water meter replacements. The work was carried out in a multi-year project. In 2013, a study by the United States Environmental Protection Agency (EPA) concluded that disturbances to lead service lines, including street work or water meter installation, could cause the leaching of lead to be elevated for months or years. During Mayor Emanuel's administration, the city consistently denied any widespread problems of lead in water, and continued the meter installation. In July 2019, Mayor Lori Lightfoot, who took office the same year, announced that the tests had shown elevated levels of lead in more than one in five metered homes, and she ordered the cessation of the meter installation program. The city also faced a lawsuit filed on behalf of the residents to force the city to solve the problem by replacing their lead service lines.

Emanuel also borrowed $412 million from 2011 to 2016 with two-thirds of the money going to replacements of the 440-mile (710 km) water mains; however, the projects did not include lead service line replacements. The workers would reconnect lead service lines to the newly installed water mains. In 2016, the city claimed that there was no evidence of risks associated with that method. The claim contradicted the 2013 EPA report and another finding in 2015 by the City of Milwaukee that prompted Milwaukee to stop installing new water mains. In addition to potential issues with reconnecting lead service lines back to water mains, there were also concerns about how the city repaired damages. During the projects, when the city damaged a lead service line, city workers would cut off the broken part of the lead service line and replace that short section with a copper line. A scientist who tested the water after the repair procedure was done on his home found an extremely high level of lead. However, the city did not perform any tests or notify any homeowners about such repairs, as that type of repair was not considered to be a partial lead service line replacement; therefore, follow-up tests were not required by regulations. An EPA advisory board concluded that the procedure could be more dangerous than a partial lead service line replacement. After 87 months of work, when the city had completed two-thirds of the water main replacement project, the total number of repairs using the procedure was still not available. An incomplete record showed a one-month snapshot to indicate that nine such repairs were done during that month.

=== Unspecified causes ===
In some cases, high levels of lead in drinking water may have not been caused by a specific incident. The cause may or may not be pinpointed to lead service lines.

In 2015, Irish Water sent out a warning that 126 households in Wexford had an excessive level of lead. It urged residents to stop using their water for drinking unless a five- to ten-minute flush had been performed. The company also recommended owners to replace their lead service lines, which are responsibility of property owners in Ireland. Starting in 2017, more than 30 areas across Ireland have been found to have unsafe levels of lead. Irish Water replaced lead service lines at their own cost as part of their leakage reduction program.

In 2017 a report from the French Agency for Food, Environmental and Occupational Health & Safety (ANSES) indicated that many older properties are at risk of high lead concentration, especially for those located in areas with older water distribution systems. The agency urged property owners to take mitigation efforts, including replacement of water pipes.

== See also ==
- Lead poisoning
- Plumbosolvency
- Water distribution system
