= LeeAnne Walters =

American environmental activist

- Known for: Grassroots environmentalism
- Awards: Goldman Environmental Prize (2018); PEN America's Freedom of Expression Courage Award (2016)

LeeAnne Walters is an American environmental activist from Flint, Michigan. She became known for her role in exposing the Flint water crisis.

== Studies and personal life ==
LeeAnne Walters was trained as medical assistant. She has four children, of which two are twins that were 4 years old in 2014.

== Environmental activism ==
Walters became known for her role in exposing the Flint water crisis. In 2014, her children started to suffer from several medical issues, like rashes, hair dropping blurry vision, and enlarged kidney. Walters started to lose her eyelashes. She then started to make the link with water that started to change color and to flow brown. After the city tested the water supply in February 2015, Walters started investigating lead contamination and discovered that the water in her home had 104 parts of lead per billion. Her house was the first in being tested. She then collected 800 water samples from all Flint zip codes with tests provided by Virginia Tech professor Marc Edwards, by working 100 hours a week for three weeks. She showed that lead levels in some areas were twice as high as what the Environmental Protection Agency considers hazardous waste.

On February 3, 2016, Walters testified before the United States House Committee on Oversight and Reform about her work during the water crisis.

In 2015, she founded the advocacy group Water You Fighting For? with Melissa Mays.

== Acknowledgment ==
In 2016, Walters was honored with the PEN America's Freedom of Expression Courage Award. The 2017 television drama film Flint is based on the toxic water disaster. In the film, Betsy Brandt played the character of Walters. Walters was awarded the Goldman Environmental Prize in 2018, for her key role in exposing the Flint water contamination crisis.
