= Cerebroprotectant =

Type of drug intended to protect the brain after stroke onset

A cerebroprotectant (formerly known as a neuroprotectant) is a drug that is intended to protect the brain after the onset of acute ischemic stroke. As stroke is the second largest cause of death worldwide and a leading cause of adult disability, over 150 drugs have been tested in clinical trials to provide cerebroprotection.

== Approved drugs ==
- Tissue plasminogen activator (also known as tPA, t-PA, rtPA, Activase, or Alteplase or Actilyse) is a drug that breaks down blood clots. It was first approved in 1996, yet this drug has no generic competition. US sales of the drug under the brand name Activase and a similar drug were approximately US$1.3 billion in 2021, while European sales under the brand name Actilyse were an additional 448 million Euro in 2019.
- Edaravone (radicut) was approved in Japan in 2001. It has an unknown mechanism of action, but is hypothesized to act through its antioxidant properties.

== Drugs in development ==
=== Approval rate ===
While over 150 cerebroprotectants have been tested in clinical trials, as of 2022 only the above two cerebroprotectants are approved, though several clinical trials for other drugs are ongoing. The approval rate has been less than 2%, which is low compared to the overall approval rate of all drugs brought into clinical trials in all disease areas from 2011 to 2022 which was 7.9%. It is also much lower than the relatively high success rate for devices to treat acute ischemic stroke, as there have been at least 5 different clot removal devices approved since 2015.

=== Methods to increase approval rate ===
There are many theories as to the causes of the low approval rate for cerebroprotectants, and many strategies have been suggested in publications to improve the chance of approval of drugs in development. The strategies that journals suggest to improve the chance of approval in clinical trials are outlined below:

Choose the right targets
Continuous research into the pathophysiology of stroke has led to improved ability to select drugs targets. Acute ischemic strokes start when there is reduced blood flow, often caused by an occlusion, to part of the brain. Even if an occlusion causes a complete blockage of a major artery, there is typically still some blood flow downstream of the blockage through collateral blood vessels. With reduced blood flow, there is reduced oxygen supply, and to compensate the tissue goes through anaerobic metabolism which is much less efficient. If anaerobic metabolism does not provide enough energy, there is energy failure, followed by ion imbalances. Afterwards, the pathophysiology gets complicated and there are thought to be at least eight pathways of tissue damage. By targeting processes near the top of the top of the chain of events, problems further down the chain of events can be avoided. For example, the drug tPA and mechanical thrombectomy devices all target the occlusion which is at the top of the chain of events, and have achieved FDA approval. The next step in the chain of events is hypoxia, and some oxygen delivery drugs have shown strong effects in animal studies, as shown in the table below. If processes further down the chain of events get targeted, there may be many simultaneous problems and the effect of a single therapy may be less, so there may be benefit to using multiple drugs in combination to treat multiple pathways.
Choose the best candidates from pre-clinical (animal) studies
A 2006 analysis of studies for 1,026 therapies in stroke and theorized that the best drugs from pre-clinical studies were not the ones being brought into clinical trials. Many of the drugs with the strongest signals in pre-clinical models were not the ones later brought into clinical trials.
Improve pre-clinical testing
Others proposed that the lack of standardization in pre-clinical models made it difficult to select the best drugs. One attempt to address this comes from the National Institute of Neurological Disorders and Stroke which started the Stroke Preclinical Assessment Network to fund a testing regimen that will allow head-to-head comparisons of different drugs.
Treat patients early enough
After the onset of stroke, the amount of brain tissue that dies increases over time, leading to the saying, "Time is brain." Treating patients earlier can lead to a greater amount of brain tissue being saved.
Protect the brain for long enough
An element of clinical trial design that affects the probability that a truly beneficial drug will show benefit is the duration of protection. A truly effective drug that is tested in a clinical trial where it protects the brain for a longer period of time would be expected to show a greater benefit verses a placebo than the same drug in a different clinical trial where it only protects the brain for a shorter period of time.
Select patients with salvageable tissue
Another element of clinical trial design is the use of imaging biomarkers to select patients that are likely to benefit from therapy. MRI and CT imaging methods that determine whether a patient is likely to have salvageable tissue have been used to great effect in clinical trials that showed the benefit of mechanical thrombectomy devices. These same methods can be applied to clinical trials for cerebroprotective drugs.
Restore blood flow after protection so that protected tissue can survive long term
If a drug protects the brain from reduced blood flow but then wears off before blood flow is normalized, then the long term effect of the drug may not be as great as it would be if the drug were paired with therapy to normalize blood flow. Pairing cerebroprotective drugs with approved methods to restore blood flow, such as tPA or mechanical thrombectomy, may increase their long term benefit.

=== Clinical trials ===
Rank	Name	First Trial	Mechanism	% Protection in Animal Studies (% Reduction in Infarct Volume)	Number of Animal Studies from Which % Protection has been Calculated	Comments	Focal ischemic stroke studies with positive results	Focal ischemic stroke studies showing no change	Focal ischemic stroke studies with negative results	Sources
1	Oxygenated fluorocarbon nutrient emulsion (OFNE) or Revoxyn	2001	Oxygen delivery	94	1	A perfluorocarbon emulsion that required drilling a hole in the skull (called a ventricular catheter). A clinical trial in 4 patients demonstrated safety, but enrollment was slow and company folded.	2	0	0	
2	Dapsone	2007	Antibacterial	93	1	Inconsistent studies in rats, one showing dramatic effect, another showing no effect. A randomized Phase II clinical trial in 30 patients showed statistically significant improvements in NIHSS and Barthel index. Development discontinued for unknown reasons.	1	1	0	
3	DDFPe, NanO_{2} or NVX-208	2017	Oxygen Delivery	85	5	Another perfluorocarbon emulsion injected intravenously thought to improve oxygen flow from red blood cells to tissue. A Phase Ib/II clinical trial was completed. The drug was safe at all three doses tested, and the high dose group had significantly better function independence (modified Rankin Scale).	9	0	0	
4	Albumin	2011	Antioxidant Improvement of microcirculation	66	1	Albumin therapy was associated with an increase in symptomatic intercranial hemorrhage and pulmonary edema/congestive heart failure.	1	0	0	
5	Veripamil	2016	Calcium channel blocker (Phenylalkylamine calcium channel)	66	2	Veripamil was administered immediately after restoration of blood flow.	2	0	1	
6	Dextromethorphan	2011	NMDA ion channel blocker	61	1	Trial in 40 patients showed that it is not cerebroprotective, but does not worsen condition or neurological outcome; reduction in seizures, and increase of MI and renal failure versus placebo.	1	0	0	
7	CP101.606-27	1999	NMDA ion channel blocker	61	3	Enrolled patients within 6 hours after stroke, but did not include patients who received tPA. The study was terminated, and the results were not reported.	3	0	0	
8	Gavestinel (GV150526A)	1999	NMDA glycine antagonist	60	18	"The cause of the neutral results with gavestinel remains to be explained. It is possible that the time window to effectively antagonize glutamate is simply less than 6 h, or that the neuroprotective benefit of infarct size reduction in animals does not translate into improved functional outcome measured in clinical trials. Just as likely, however, expectations with gavestinel were over-inflated because only positive preclinical results were published (it is common that negative results in animal studies go unreported). Mild beneficial effects were only seen in carefully standardized stroke models that do not reflect the heterogeneity of stroke patients where more robust efficacy would be needed to achieve clinical significance."	8	6	0	
9	SP-8203	2016	antioxidant and NMDA receptor antagonist	59	1	Phase II in progress in 2018 in patients with product dosed after tPA. Pre-clinical studies showed high level of dose dependency.	1	0	0	
10	ketamine	2014	NMDA receptor antagonist	57	1	Phase I/II in progress as of 2018	1	0	0	
11	Hu23F2G (LeukArrest)	1999	Leukocyte adhesion inhibitor	57	1		1	0	0	
12	Donepezil	2008	selective acetylcholinesterase inhibitor	56	1		1	0	0	
13	Repinotan (BAY × 3072)	2000	Serotonin agonist	56	2		2	0	0	
14	Prourokinase	1998	Antithrombotic	55	12		12	0	0	
15	3K3A-APC	2014	anti-inflammatory	54	8	A Phase II clinical trial in 110 patients published in 2019 showed the drug was safe, and there was a trend towards less hemorrhage, but there was also a trend towards less favorable outcomes. The incidence of favorable outcome (90-day mRS 0 or 1) was not statistically significantly different from placebo, (45.2% treatment vs 62.8% placebo).	8	0	0	
16	Granulocytecolony stimulating factor (G-CSF)	2003	activator of transcription-3 (STAT3) in the periphery of the infarction	53	1	No effect - G-CSF did not improve stroke outcome in this individual patient data meta-analysis.	9	0	0	
17	Urokinase	1976	Thrombolytic	53	12		13	1	0	
18	Atorvastatin	2015	Statin considered to have favorable impact on blood brain barrier, oxidative stress, cerebral blood flow, and inflammation	52	1	Phase IV in progress in China as of 2019	1	0	0	
19	Deferoxamine	2012	Iron chelator; bacterial siderophore	52	2	Phase II completed but results not published, and no Phase 3 was started.	2	0	0	
20	Caffeinol	2002	Stimulant, depressant, diuretic Adenosine receptor modulator	51	10		8	2	0	
21	CNS1102 (Cerestat, aptiganel)	1994	NMDA ion channel blocker	51	11		11	2	0	
22	Dextrorphan	1994	NMDA ion channel blocker	50	17		13	6	0	
23	JPI-289	2017	PARP-1 Inhibitor	49	1	Jeil Pharmaceutical Co., Ltd, Phase II in progress in Korea as of 2019. Safety and dosing was demonstrated in healthy adults.				
24	Minocycline	2007	antibiotic	49	1	Phase IV terminated due to futility. Enrolled patients up to 48 hours after stroke.	2	0	0	
25	Remacemide	1994	NMDA ion channel blocker	49	1		1	0	0	
26	tPA (< 3 hours)	1995	Thrombolytic	49	9	tPA was approved for use up to 3 hours after onset, though the initial tirals up to 6 hours after onset showed no significant improvement. Pre-clinical models showed a beneficial effect of the drug when given up to 3 hours but a detrimental effect when given beyond 3 hours.	9	10	0	
27	Diaspirin cross-linked hemoglobin	1998	Oxygen delivery Free radical scavenger	48	5		5	1	0	
28	Eliprodil (SL 82.0715)	1994	NMDA polyamine antagonist Sigma ligand	48	4		6	0	0	
29	CGS 19755 (selfotel)	1995	NMDA antagonist	47	2		4	1	1	
30	Hypothermia	1998	Reduce reducing cerebral oxygen demand (CMRO2), Metabolic and synaptic transmission inhibitor.	46	92		94	28	0	
31	Lifarizine (RS-87476)	1995	Sodium/calcium channel blocker	46	8		5	4	0	
32	Glibenclamide (BIIB093, BIIB-093, glibenclamide IV, formerly Cirara or RP-1127).	2010	selective inhibitor of SUR1-TRPM4 channels that mediate stroke related brain swelling.	45	3	As of 2022 Biogen is in Phase III in patients with large infarcts with volumes of 80 to 300 centimeters cubed. These patients tend to have poor outcomes due to the large infarcts.	3	0	0	
33	MP-124	2011	PARP-1 Inhibitor	44	2	A Phase 1 drug developed by Mitsubishi Tanabe's with an unclear status as of 2019.	2	0	0	
34	NS1209/SPD 502	1999	Gluamate antagonist	44	2		2	0	0	
35	NXY-059	2001	Free radical scavenger	43	27	AstraZeneca's drug that completed its second Phase III in 2006, leading to what some called the "nuclear winter" in stroke research. At the time, imaging biomarkers were less developed. Secondly, mechanical thrombectomy was not invented yet, and patients with large vessel occlusions in the trial likely had low reperfusion rates. Furthermore, the pathology is better known today, and the chain of events is better understood. The drug targteted processes that were far downstream in the ischemic cascade thereby giving the drug a weaker clinical signal than many drugs targeting processes further up the ischemic cascade. The first Phase III in 1700 patients saw a significant improvement in mRS (p=0.03), but missed all its secondary endpoints. A second Phase III in 3,300 patients saw no effect in any endpoint.	24	5	0	
36	Clomethiazole (CMZ, Zendra)	1996	GABA agonist	42	7		8	2	0	
37	Vinpocetine (ethyl apovincaminate)	1986	Calcium inhibitor, Vasodilator, Sodium blocker; synthetic derivative of the vinca alkaloid vincamine, an extract from the lesser periwinkle plant.	42	1	Results of Phase III published in 2016. Off patent - first made in 1975. A clinical trial in 610 patients in China was completed, showing improved outcomes in NIHSS, and Barthel Index.	1	0	0	
38	Neu2000	2016	NR2B-selective NMDA receptor antagonist and spin trapping molecule (=free radical scavenger or antioxidant)	41.2	1	GNT Pharma. Enrolls only patients with confirmed AIS eligible for MT up to 8 hours after onset. The drug will provide only a short duration of protection before MT restores blood flow, probably averaging an hour or less. If they paused the clock perfectly, they would need thousands of patients to show an effect, so there is risk of failing the Phase II due to having too short of a duration of protection. Therapeutic potential of Neu2000 has been well demonstrated in four animal models of stroke with better efficacy and therapeutic time windows than either NMDA receptor antagonist or anti-oxidant advanced to clinical trials. In human phase I studies of 165 healthy subjects conducted in the United States and China, Neu2000KWL showed promising safety profiles without any serious adverse events.	4			
39	Sipatrigine (BW619C89)	1995	Sodium channel antagonist Glutamate release inhibitor	41	37		40	4	0	
40	NA-1 (TatNR2B9c)	2008	Postsynaptic density-95 protein inhibitor	40	6	NoNO Inc is using an ion channel inhibitor called NA-1 (nerenetide). They recently completed a Phase III clinical trial in Large Vessel Occlusion (LVO) patients undergoing mechanical thrombectomy, but the trial showed neutral results in the overall population. The subset of patients that did not get tPA showed benefit, therefore they are seeking to run another Phase III clinical in LVO patients who are ineligible for tPA and hope to initiate this trial in 2021. They are enrolling in another Phase III trial that enrolls a broad population of stroke patients in the field, and results are expected in 2022.	6	2	0	
41	AER-271	2018	inhibitor of Aquaporin-4 (AQP4) water channels	39	1	Initiated Phase 1 trial in June 2018. The osmotic imbalance and subsequent influx of water via AQP4 occurs as a result of a lack of oxygen and leads to edema, midline shift, increased intracranial pressure and brain herniation resulting in permanent disability or mortality. Targets the same physiology as Biogen's BIIB-093 (glyburide for incjection or CIRARA), but via a different pathway. Edema is further down the ischemic cascade than hypoxia.	0	0	0	
42	Erythropoietin (EPO)	2002	Controls red blood cell production	39	9	Tested again in 2009. Clnical trial showed no significant difference in neurological recovery. Significantly increased mortality rate and safety concerns	11	2	0	
43	ARL 15896 (AR-A15896AR)	1999	NMDA antagonist	39	15		10	8	0	
44	Piracetam	1988	AMPA (NA+) modulator	39	5		4	1	0	
45	Nafronyl oxalate (naftidrofuryl)	1978	Serotonin antagonist	38	5		6	2	0	
46	ACEA 1021 (licostinel)	1997	NMDA glycine site antagonist	37	25		19	6	0	
47	Propentofylline (HWA 285)	1992	Phosphodiesterase inhibitor	37	7		9	2	0	
48	S-0139 (SB-737004)	1999	Endothelin antagonist	36	4		3	1	0	
49	PG2 (Polysaccharides of Astragalus membranaceus)	2015	Chinese Herb, Antiinflammatory	36	1	Phase IV clinical trial status unclear.	1	0	0	
50	Trans sodium crocetinate	2018	increases diffusion of oxygen	35	3		3			
51	TNK (tenecteplase)	2000	Thrombolytic agent	35	2		2	0	0	
52	Magnesium Sulfate	1993	NMDA ion channel blocker. Calcium antagonist	35	10	The first drug tested that had a significant amount of patients dosed in the first 2 hours in the FAST-MAG trial. Phase III results published in 2015 showed no therapeutic benefit.	11	0	0	
53	propanolol	1988	β-adrenergic blockade, Membrane stabilization	34	4	Studied most recently in 2013. Phase II/III completed, but results not published.	3	8	0	
54	Mannitol	1978	Hyperosmotic agent. Reduces edema and ICP	34	19		10	15	1	
55	Dextran	1969	Hemodilution	34	7		4	5	1	
56	N-acetyl-cysteine (NAC)	2015	Free radical scavenger	33	1		1	0	0	
57	PS519/MLN519	2000	Proteasome inhibitor	32	14		11	3	0	
58	Heparin	1979	Anticoagulant	32	17		10	10	3	
59	FK506 (pacrolimus)	2004	Immunosuppressant	31	72	Stopped in Phase II, adverse side effects	52	27	0	
60	Neutrophil inhibitory factor (rNIF, UK-279.276)	2000	Neutrophil inhibitor	31	12		8	4	0	
61	YM90K	1997	AMPA antagonist	31	23		19	6	0	
62	Aspirin	1995	Antiplatelet	31	19		9	13	0	
63	Lovastatin (aka simvastatin)	2001	HMGCoA reductase inhibitor	30	20	Finished recruitment in Phase II trial in 2017, results not published as of 2019.	11	1	0	
64	Normobaric oxygen treatment	2009	Oxygen Delivery	30	6	Several human studies evaluating normobaric oxygen therapy for stroke treatment have been performed. However, there is not much room to increase oxygen delivery by increasing the concentration of oxygen breathed does not increase the blood oxygen level much. The normal oxygen saturation of red blood cells is 95-99%, and plasma only dissolves a small amount of oxygen. Human studies showed no significant difference in neurological recovery. No trials have shown any evidence that the therapy is detrimental.	5	0	1	
65	Basic fibroblast growth factor (trafermin. Fiblast)	1998	Growth factor	29	35		22	19	0	
66	Naloxone	1981	Opioid antagonist	29	7		8	7	0	
67	Ebselen	2009	Free radical scavenger; synthetic organo-selenium antiinflammatory, anti-oxidant and cytoprotective activity; mimic glutathione peroxidase	27	9	Tested in Phase III but never reached market, and now out of patent.	10	6	0	
68	BIII-890-CL	2001	Sodium Channel Blocker	27	6	Still in trial in 2014	6	0	0	
69	YM872	1999	AMPA antagonist	27	32		22	8	0	
70	Ebselen (Harmokisane)	1998	Free radical scavenger	27	9		10	6	0	
71	Abciximab (reopro, c7E3 Fab)	1998	Antiplatelet: glycoprotein inhibitor	27	2		1	1	0	
72	Tirilazad (U74006F)	1994	Free radical scavenger	26	16		11	8	0	
73	nimodipine	1984	antihypertensive drug	26	37	May be in clinical trials in China in 2016, but status is unknown. Failed earlier clinical trials.	24	28	0	
74	Enoxaparin	2003	Antithrombotic	25	25		12	13	0	
75	ONO-2506	2003	Astrocyte modulating agent Anenuates extracellular monamine	25	8		5	3	0	
76	EGB-761 (Ginkgo biloba extract)	1995	MAO inhibitor Antiplatelet.	25	15		13	3	0	
77	Citicoline (CDP choline)	1987	Membrane precursor, antioxidant	25	13		4	9	0	
78	Edaravone (MCI-186)	2001	Free radical scavenger nootropic and neuroprotective agent	24	8	Approved in Japan.	7	5	0	
79	Hyperbaric oxygen treatment	1966	Oxygen delivery	24	17		13	5	2	
80	Indomethacin	2001	Cyclooxygenase inhibitor	23	2		3	2	0	
81	Lubeluzole	1994	Sodium/calcium channel blocker NOS inhibitor	23	19		13	8	0	
82	Hydroxyethyl starch pentastarch	1980	Hemodilution	23	3		4	3	1	
83	Cyclosporin A	2014	Immunosuppressant	22	1	Not effective in reducing infarct size. However, a smaller infarct size was observed in patients with proximal cerebral arteryocclusion and efficient recanalization.	9	2	0	
84	natalizumab	2016	prevents leukocytes from moving across the blood-brain barrier	22	3	Discontinued by Biogen after a Phase II trial showed that natalizumab administered ≤24 hours after acute ischemic stroke did not improve patient outcomes.	4	2	0	
85	Anerod	1983	Fibrinogen depleting	21	4		4	1	0	
86	ZK200775 (MPQX)	1997	AMPA antagonist	19	21		12	9	0	
87	Dexamethasone	1971	Glucocorticoid, antiinflammatory	19	11	Continued in 2011. Clinical trials showed improvement of level of consciousness was statistically significant in Dexamethasone treated group, but did not reduce volume of hypodense area.	7	8	1	
88	Nicaraven (N,N′-propylenedinicotinamide)	2001	Free radical scavenger	17	4		2	2	0	
89	Insulin	1993	Lowers glucose	16	5		4	1	2	
90	ABL-101 (Oxycyte)	2018	Oxygen Delivery	15	1	Developed by Aurum Biosciences, formerly developed by Oxycyte. A perfluorocarbon emulsion that works like a blood substitute.	1	0	0	
91	BMS-204352	1998	Potassium channel opener	14	9		7	1	0	
92	Enlimomab (anti–ICAM-1 antibody)	1996	Leukocyte migration and adhesion inhibitor	14	9		6	7	1	
93	Nicardipine	1988	Calcium antagonist	11	6		8	10	0	
94	Argatroban	1986	Anticoagulant	11	4		3	3	0	
95	TAK-218	2001	Dopamine suppressor	10	1		0	1	0	
96	Paracetemol (Acetaminophen)	2009	Analgesic/antipyretic COX inhibitor	8	1		0	1	0	
97	n-PA/tPA (alteplase)	1988	Antithrombotic	4	86		52	38	11	
98	Ganglioside GM1	1984	Metabolism, growth	4	1		6	4	0	
99	GSK249320	2013	Antagonises or neutralises myelin associated glycoprotein (MAG) - mediated inhibition	0	1	GlaxoSmithKline, discontinued in 2017 after showing no effect at interim analysis.	0	1	0	
100	Simvastatin	2008	HMGCoA reductase inhibitor Antioxidant	0	1	No differences were found between treatment arms regarding the primary outcome.	0	1	0	
101	Baclofen	2001	GABA-B Antagonist	0	0		1	1	0	
102	Amphetamines	2003	Stimulant	-3	1		1	2	0	
103	Papaverine	1976	Calcium channel blocker	-3	1		0	1	0	
104	Flunarizine	1990	Calcium channel blocker	-6	3		4	1	1	
105	Prosatacyclin	1984	Antiplatelet: eicosanoid Vasodilator	-6	1		1	1	0	
106	tPA (>3 hours)	1995	Thrombolytic	-39	2	The data in animals showed benefit below 3 hours after stroke onset and a detrimental effect after three hours (an increase in infarct volume). The data is calculated from the caterpillar plot in figure 1.	0	7	2	
107	Streptokinase	1963	Thrombolytic	-525	6		1	4	5	
108	LT3001	2019	Thrombolytic and antioxidant	0	0	Lumosa Therapeutics was running a Phase II clinical trial in 2022	0	0	0	
109	TMS-007	2014	Thrombolytic	0	0	Biogen acquired TMS-007 in 2021 after a positive Phase IIa trial.	0	0	0	
110	GM602	2016	anti-inflammatory	—	-	Phase II completed, but no Phase III has appeared to have been started. Run by Genervon. No pre-clinical data published.	-	-	-	
111	Vitamin B2	2015	Causes a Reduction of Glutamate-mediated Excitotoxicity	—	0	Phase II complete, but no results published.	0	0	0	
112	Irbesartan	2012	AT1 receptor antagonist Antihypertensive	—	-	Agent did not appear to substantially modify infarct growth.	1	-	-	
113	Lu AA24493 (carbamylated erythropoietin CEPO)	2011	Controls red blood cell production	—	-	Unknown toxicity claims halted development. Trial run by H. Lundbeck AS	-	-	-	
114	NTx-265	2009	Regeneration; Human Chorionic Gonadotropin (hCG) and Epoetin Alfa (EPO)	—	-	No significant difference in neurological recovery.	-	-	-	
115	ILS-920	2009	Calcium channel blocker	—	-	Now owned by Pfizer, but no longer on Pfizer's pipeline.	-	-	-	
116	Eptifibatide (cromafiban; Integrilin)	2003	Antiplatelet: glycoprotein inhibitor	—	0		0	0	0	
117	Desmoteplase (DSPA)	2002	Antithrombotic	—	0		0	0	0	
118	S-1746	2001	NMDA glycine/AMPA antagonist	—	0		0	0	0	
119	Tirofiban (MK-383, aggrastat)	2001	Antiplatelet: glycoprotein inhibitor	—	0		0	0	0	
120	Triflusal (2-acetoxy-4-trifluoromethylbenzonic acid)	2001	Arachidonic acid metabolism inhibitor (antiplatelet)	—	0		1	2	0	
121	Cerebrolysin	2001	Nootropic	—	0	A total of 1070 patients were enrolled in this study. Five hundred twenty-nine patients were assigned to Cerebrolysin and 541 to placebo. The confirmatory end point showed no significant difference between the treatment groups. When the predefined stratification by severity was repeated with the criterion NIHSS, however, a small superiority for Cerebrolysin in the sub-group with baseline NIHSS>12 (OR, 1.27; CI-LB, 0.97; P=0.04) could be shown . Also, when applying the mRS, a small superiority in the sub-group with baseline NIHSS>12 (OR, 1.27; CI-LB, 0.90; P=0.09) was found. The following analysis also focused on the subgroup baseline NIHSS>12 points only and provided a global test result for all 3 criteria combined. This global test results in MW=0.53 (CI-LB, 0.47; P=0.16), which showed a beneficial trend for Cerebrolysin in the study patients.	1	1	0	
122	DP-b99 (DPBAPA)	2000	Calcium chelator	—	0	Interim futility analysis showed no evidence of efficacy, published in 2008.	0	0	0	
123	Diazepam (valium)	2000	Benzodiazepine	—	0		0	1	0	
124	Certoparin	2000	Anticoagulant	—	0		0	0	0	
125	Dalteparin	2000	Anticoagulant	—	0		0	0	0	
126	Radix salviae miltiorrhizae	2000	Antioxidant Partial endothelin-1 inhibitor	—	0		1	1	0	
127	glyceril trinitrate	1999	NO donor	—	-	Phase III results published in 2015. ENOS enrolled 4011 participants with acute stroke (within 48 h of onset). Overall, there was no significant shift in functional outcome measured using the modified Rankin Scale at day 90, or of any secondary outcomes. Off patent. $7 per patch.	1	0	0	
128	Candesartan cilexetil (TCV-116, Blopress, CV-11974)	1999	AT1 receptor antagonist Antihypertensive	—	-	Results published in 2012: no significant difference in neurological recovery; harmful effect suggested	-	-	-	
129	Fludrocortisone	1999	Mineralocorticoid	—	0		0	0	0	
130	LDP-01 (Anti–β-2-integrin antibody)	1999	Leukocyte adhesion and migration inhibitor	—	0		0	0	0	
131	Nalmefene	1998	Opioid antagonist	—	0		0	0	0	
132	NPS 1506	1998	NMDA ion channel blocker	—	0		6	2	0	
133	RPR 109891	1998	Antiplatelet glycoprotein inhibitor	—	0		0	0	0	
134	Tinzaparin	1998	Anticoagulant	—	0		0	0	0	
135	Org 10172 (danaparoid, Orgaran)	1997	Antithrombotic	—	0		0	0	0	
136	Semax	1997	Derivative of ACTH-4-10	—	0		0	0	0	
137	Glycine	1996	NMDA antagonist	—	0		0	0	0	
138	Fosphentoyn	1995	Sodium Channel Blocker, Glutemate Release Inhibitor	—	0	Phase III terminated early due to futility.	0	0	0	
139	Batroxobin (defibrase, DF-521)	1995	Fibrinogen depleting	—	0		4	0	0	
140	Nadroparin	1995	Antithrombotic	—	0		0	0	0	
141	Defibrotide (polydeoxyribonucleotide)	1989	Antiplatelet: glycoprotein inhibitor	—	0		0	0	0	
142	Atenol (Tenormin)	1988	Beta blocker	—	0		0	0	0	
143	Corticotrophin	1987	GABA receptor modulator Pituitary hormone	—	0		0	0	0	
144	PY 108-068	1986	Calcium antagonist	—	0		2	0	0	
145	Trazodone (Desyrel)	1986	Serotonin reuptake inhibitor	—	0		0	0	0	
146	Nicergoline	1985	α2 adrenoceptor agonist	—	0		1	0	0	
147	Nicergoline	1985	Alpha2 adrenoceptor agonist	—	0		1	0	0	
148	Pentoxifylline	1981	Improve capillary flow	—	0		0	1	0	
149	Hydergine	1978	Nootropic, antioxidant.	—	0		0	0	0	
150	Tinofedrine (D 8955, Novocebrin)	1978	Blood flow, increased metabolism	—	0		0	0	0	
151	Xanthinol nicotinate (Sadamin)	1977	Vitamin B(3): metabolic enhancer	—	0		0	0	0	
152	Aminophylline	1976	Phosphodiesterase inhibitor	—	0		0	0	0	
153	Glycerol	1972	Hyperosmolar agent	—	0		0	2	0	
154	Cyclandelate	1966	Vasodilator (calcium modulator)	—	0		0	0	0	
