= Table of volume of distribution for drugs =

This is a table of volume of distribution (V_{d}) for various medication. For comparison, those with a V_{d} L/kg body weight of less than 0.2 are mainly distributed in blood plasma, 0.2-0.7 mostly in the extracellular fluid and those with more than 0.7 are distributed throughout total body water.

Medication	V_{d} L/kg body weight
heparin	0.05-0.1
insulin	0.05-0.1
warfarin	0.1-0.2
sulfamethoxazole	0.1-0.2
glibenclamide	0.1-0.2
atenolol	0.1-0.2
NXY-059	0.1-0.2
tubocurarine	0.2-0.4
theophylline	0.4-0.7
ethanol	0.7-0.9
neostigmine	0.7-0.9
phenytoin	0.7-0.9
methotrexate	1-2
indometacin	1-2
paracetamol	1-2
diazepam	1-2
lidocaine	1-2
glyceryl trinitrate	2-5
morphine	2-5
propranolol	2-5
digoxin	2-5
chlorpromazine	2-5
nortriptyline	2-5
chloroquine	200
