= Emilio Quaia =

- Born: 1969 (age 56–57); Pordenone, Italy
- Education: University of Udine; University of Trento; University of Modena
- Known for: Contrast-enhanced ultrasound of the liver, kidney and chest
- Scientific career
- Fields: Radiology, diagnostic imaging, contrast-enhanced ultrasound
- Workplaces: University of Padua; University of Edinburgh; University of Trieste
- Thesis: Monitoraggio delle concentrazioni plasmatiche della L-Dopa in pazienti affetti da morbo di Parkinson (1995)

Emilio Quaia (born 1969) is an Italian radiologist, academic, and writer. He is a professor of radiology and director of the radiology department at the University of Padua. He is editor-in-chief of the journal Tomography and a deputy editor of Insights into Imaging.

== Early life and education ==
Quaia was born in Northern Italy. He studied medicine at the University of Udine, earning a Doctor of Medicine (MD) degree in 1995. He completed a radiology residency at the University of Trieste in the late 1990s. He also holds a master's degree in management and leadership of health organizations from the University of Trento and a master's degree in statistical methods applied to clinical questions from the University of Modena.

== Career ==
Quaia began his academic career at the University of Trieste, joining the radiology faculty in the early 2000s. He became an associate professor of radiology in 2014, with research focused on urogenital and abdominal imaging. In 2016, he moved to the United Kingdom to work at the University of Edinburgh as a senior clinical research fellow and honorary consultant radiologist. From 2016 to 2018, he worked at the Royal Infirmary of Edinburgh and the Queen's Medical Research Institute.

In 2018, Quaia returned to Italy and became a full professor of radiology at the University of Padua. He was appointed head of the radiology institute at Padua's teaching hospital. His appointment as primario (clinical chief) was delayed due to an administrative dispute between the university and the hospital administration, which required regional intervention. The issue was later resolved, and Quaia took over leadership of the radiology department. He also directs the university's radiology residency program.

In 2021, Quaia was appointed editor-in-chief of Tomography, an open-access journal focused on imaging research. He also serves as deputy editor of Insights into Imaging, the journal of the European Society of Radiology. He is also a fellow of the European Society of Urogenital Radiology and a member of the European Society of Gastrointestinal and Abdominal Radiology (ESGAR).

== Research ==
Quaia's research focuses on diagnostic imaging of the abdomen and chest, with particular emphasis on ultrasound. His work includes studies on contrast-enhanced ultrasound (CEUS) and its applications in organ pathology. He has published on multimodal imaging of diseases affecting the liver, gastrointestinal tract, kidneys, and lungs, examining the combined use of ultrasound, computed tomography (CT), and Magnetic resonance imaging (MRI) for lesion detection and characterization. He has also conducted research in preclinical imaging using micro-PET and micro-MRI in small-animal disease models.

== Books ==
- Contrast Media in Ultrasonography: Basic Principles and Clinical Applications (2005), ISBN 978-3-540-40740-9
- Radiological Imaging of the Kidney (2010), ISBN 978-3-540-87596-3
- Imaging of the Liver and Intra-hepatic Biliary Tract (2020), ISBN 978-3-030-38982-6
