= Disufenton/acetylcysteine =

Combination of
- Disufenton sodium: Antioxidant
- Acetylcysteine: Antioxidant

Clinical data
- Other names: Disufenton/N-acetylcysteine; HPN-07/NAC; NHPN-1010; NXY-059/NAC
- Drug class: Free-radical inhibitors; Oxygen-radical scavengers

Legal status
- Legal status: Investigational

Pharmacokinetic data
- Metabolism: Unknown
- Excretion: Unknown

Disufenton/acetylcysteine (also known as HPN-07/NAC, NHPN-1010, or NXY-059/NAC) is an investigational combination therapy consisting of the nitrone free-radical trap disufenton sodium and the antioxidant N-acetylcysteine (NAC). It has been studied in preclinical research for noise-induced sensorineural hearing loss, tinnitus, cochlear synaptopathy, and traumatic brain injury, although as of 2024 there is no reported clinical development for any indication.

== Mechanism ==
Disufenton/acetylcysteine is described as acting through free-radical inhibition and oxygen-radical scavenging, processes relevant to oxidative stress injury in auditory and neural tissues.

== Rationale in auditory disorders ==
Oxidative stress and neuroinflammation contribute to noise induced cochlear injury, ribbon-synapse loss, and tinnitus-related neuronal hyperactivity.

== Tinnitus ==
Animal models have suggested that the combination may reduce behavioral correlates of tinnitus following noise trauma, likely via protection of inner-hair-cell synapses and reduction of neural hyperactivity.

== See also ==
- List of investigational tinnitus drugs
