= C20H21N3O4 =

The molecular formula C_{20}H_{21}N_{3}O_{4} (molar mass: 367.405 g/mol) may refer to:

- Neocitrullamon
- AUT-00063
