= Renal cyst =

- Other names: Kidney cysst
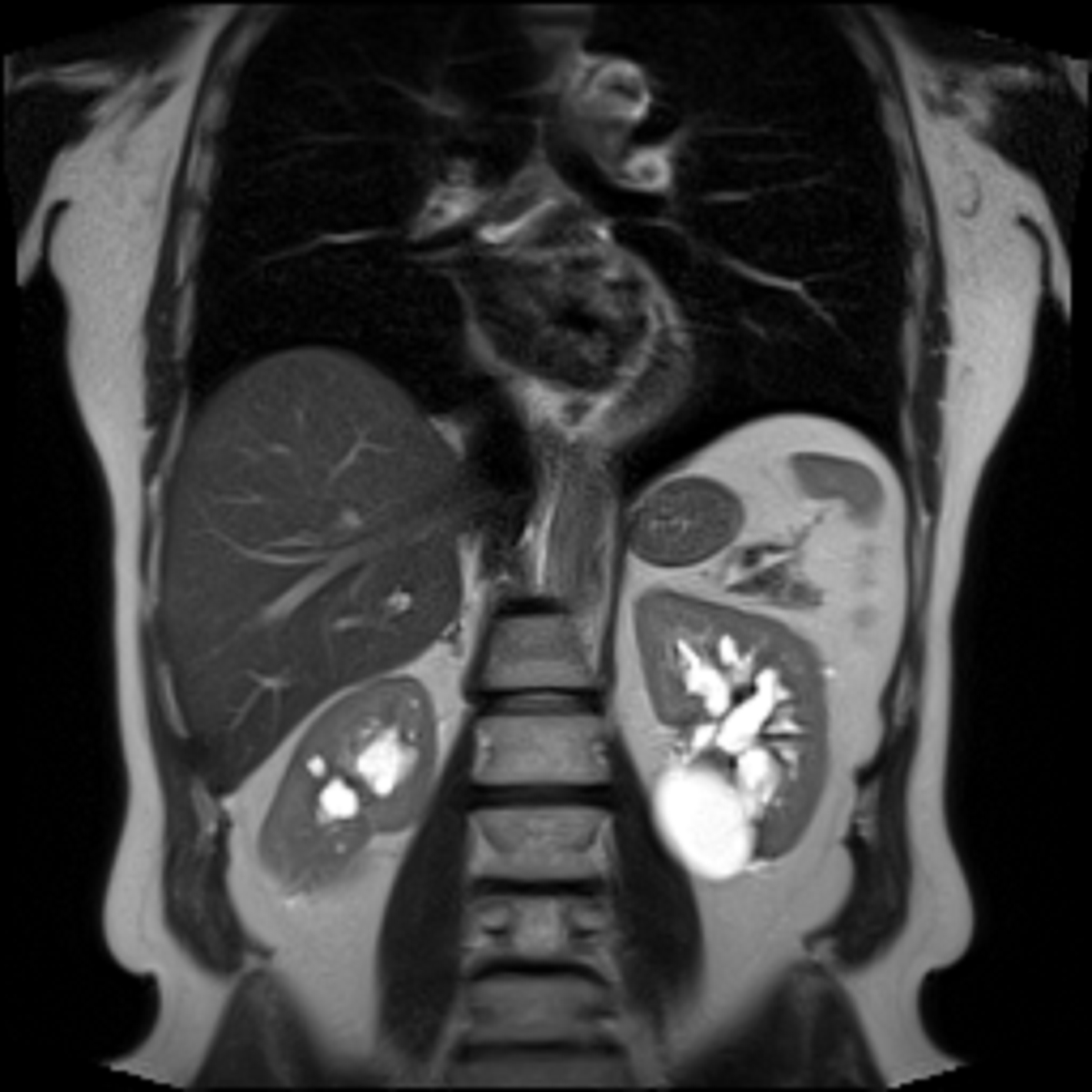
- Renal cyst of the left kidney (hyperintense area) as shown on MRI
- Specialty: Urology

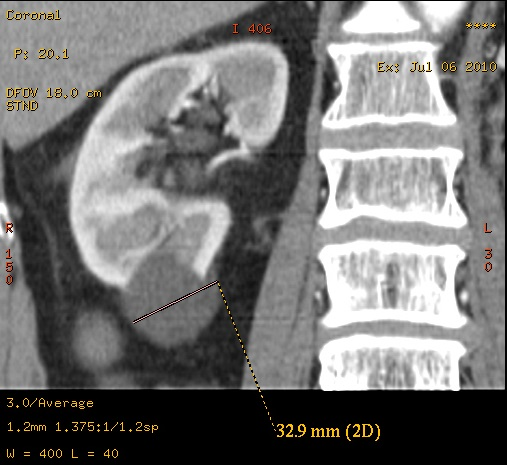
Simple renal cyst

A renal cyst is a fluid collection in or on the kidney. There are several types based on the Bosniak classification. The majority are benign, simple cysts that can be monitored and not intervened upon. However, some are cancerous or are suspicious for cancer and are commonly removed in a surgical procedure called nephrectomy.

Numerous renal cysts are seen in the cystic kidney diseases, which include polycystic kidney disease and medullary sponge kidney.

== Classification ==
Renal cysts are classified by malignant risk using the Bosniak classification system. The system was created by Morton Bosniak (1929–2016), a faculty member at the New York University Langone Medical Center in New York City.

The Bosniak classification categorizes renal cysts into five groups. Online calculators have been developed that facilitate calculation of the Bosniak score.

=== Category I ===
Benign simple cyst with thin wall without septa, calcifications, or solid components, and has a density of 0–20 Hounsfield units (HU) (about equal to that of water). In such cases, a CT scan without intravenous contrast is enough for classification. Still, if a contrast CT is performed, a category I cyst should not show significant enhancement, which can be regarded as an increase of less than 10HU.

=== Category II ===
Benign cyst with a few thin septa, which may contain fine calcifications or a small segment of mildly thickened calcification. This includes homogenous, high-attenuation (60–70 Hounsfield units) lesions less than 3 cm with sharp margins but without enhancement. Hyperdense cysts must be exophytic with at least 75 percent of its wall outside the kidney to allow for appropriate assessment of margins, otherwise they are categorized as IIF.

=== Category IIF ===
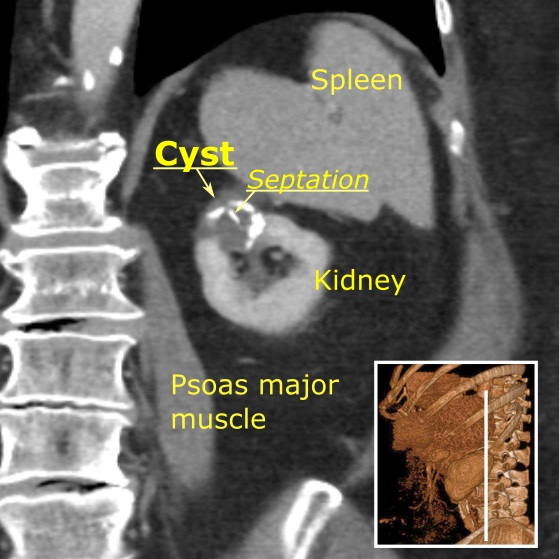
A Bosniak category IIF cyst. This one is 3 cm wide, with calcifications within its wall, seen as very radiodense (white in this presentation) areas in its margins. There is also a septation which is calcified. Yet, the cyst does not show enhancement (uptake of contrast).

This category includes renal cysts with multiple thin septa, a septum thicker than hairline, slightly thick wall, or with calcification, which may be thick. It also includes intrarenal cysts larger than 3 centimetres (1.2 inches) if:

- there is no contrast enhancement (otherwise category III).
- there is high attenuation or there is a maximum 25% of their walls visible outside the kidney (otherwise category II).

Category IIF cysts have a 5–10% risk of being kidney cancer, and therefore follow-up is recommended. However, there is no consensus recommendation on the appropriate interval of follow up.

=== Category III ===
Indeterminate cystic masses with thickened, irregular or smooth walls or septa with measurable enhancement. Approximately 40 to 60% of these lesions are ultimately found to be malignant, most commonly in the forms of cystic renal cell carcinoma and its multiloculated variant. The remaining lesions are benign and include hemorrhagic cysts, chronic infected cysts, and multiloculated cystic nephromas.

=== Category IV ===
Malignant cystic masses with all the characteristics of category III lesions but also with enhancing soft tissue components independent of but adjacent to the septa. Approximately 85 to 100% of these lesions are malignant.

The presence of measurable contrast enhancement of the lesion is the most important characteristic in distinguishing between high-risk cysts (classifications III and IV) from the typically benign, low-risk Bosniak I, II, and IIF cysts. Such contrast enhancement should be at least 10 to 15 Hounsfield units higher when compared with unenhanced images.

	Bosniak category				
	I	II	IIF	III	IV
Attenuation	0–20 HU	60–70 Hounsfield units			
Walls	Thin and smooth	Small and fine calcifications	Nodular or irregular calcifications	Thick, heterogeneous. Gross calcifications with enhancement	
Solid components	No				Yes

== Diagnosis ==
The complex cyst can be further evaluated with doppler ultrasonography, and for Bosniak classification and follow-up of complex cysts, either contrast-enhanced ultrasound (CEUS) or contrast CT is used.

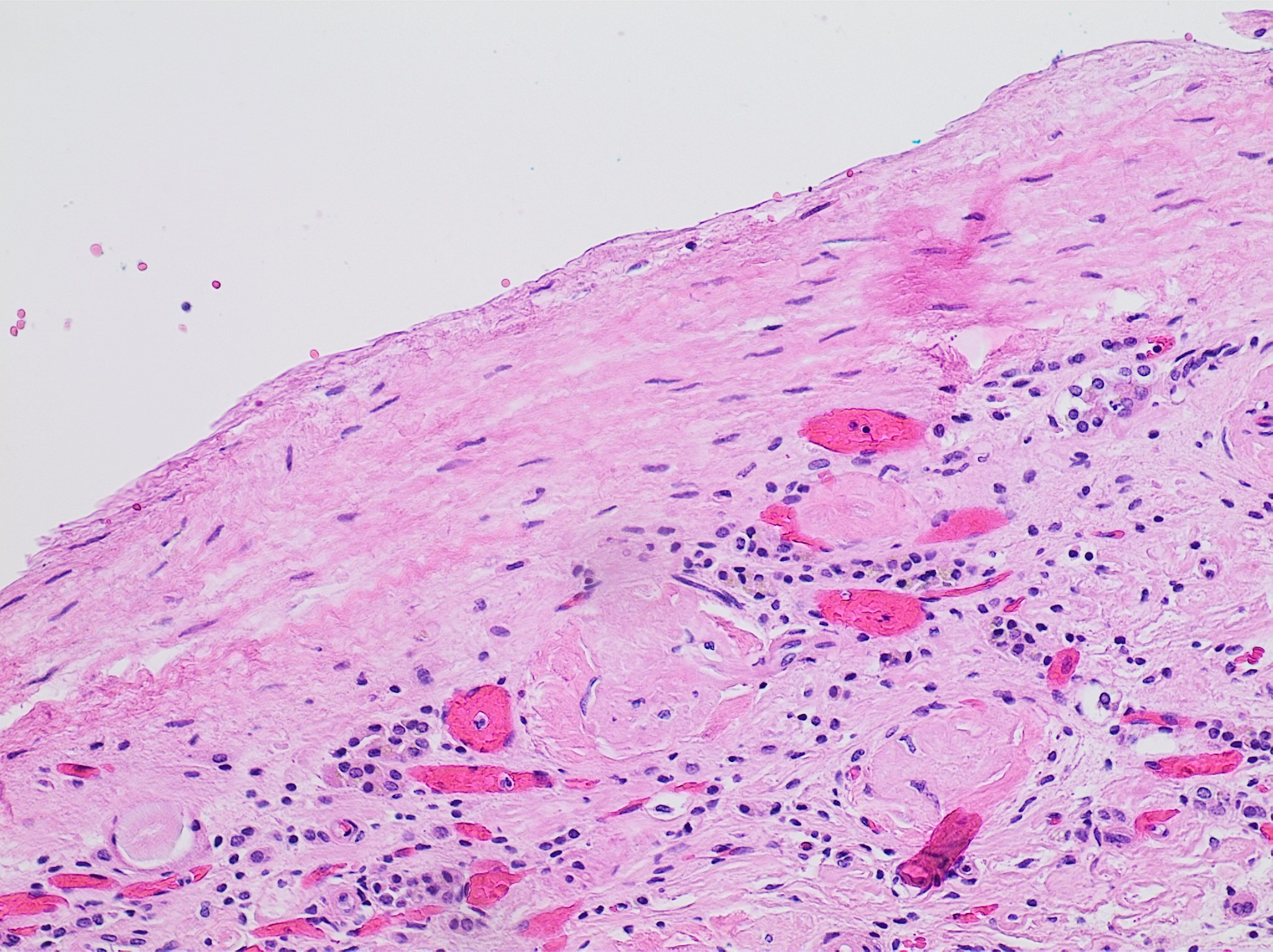
Histopathology of the lining of a simple cyst of the kidney, incidentally found on autopsy, with inconspicuous nuclei. They usually have a single layer of cuboidal, flattened or atrophic epithelium, but this case has a somewhat thicker fibrous layer. H&E stain.

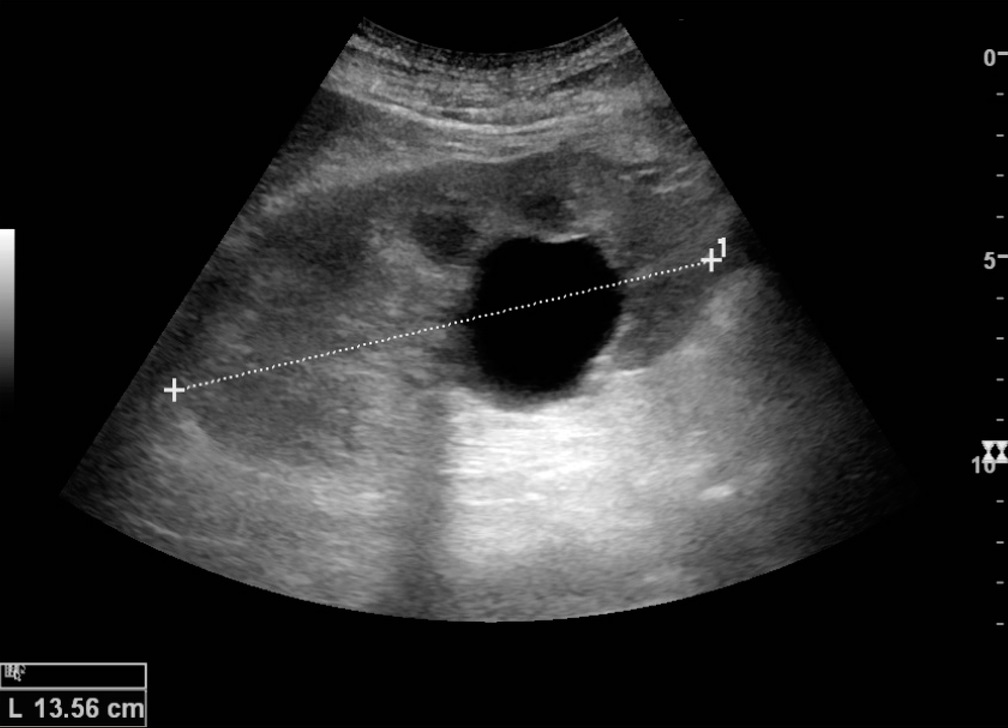
Renal ultrasonography of a simple renal cyst with posterior enhancement

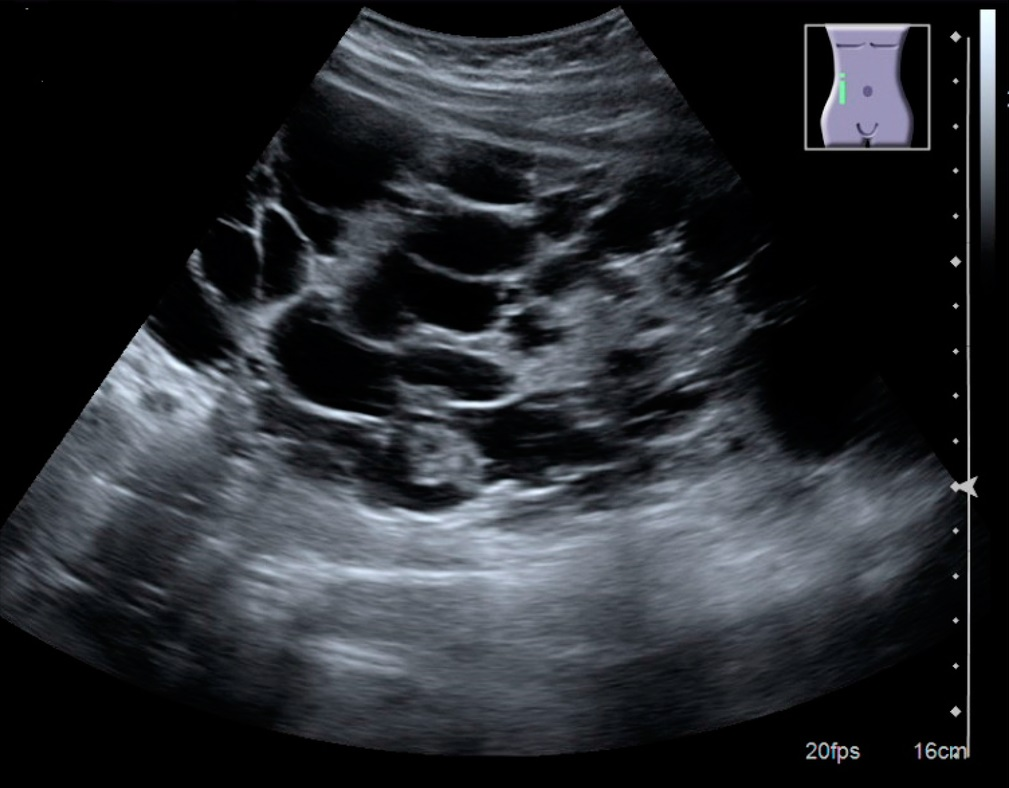
Advanced polycystic kidney disease with multiple cysts

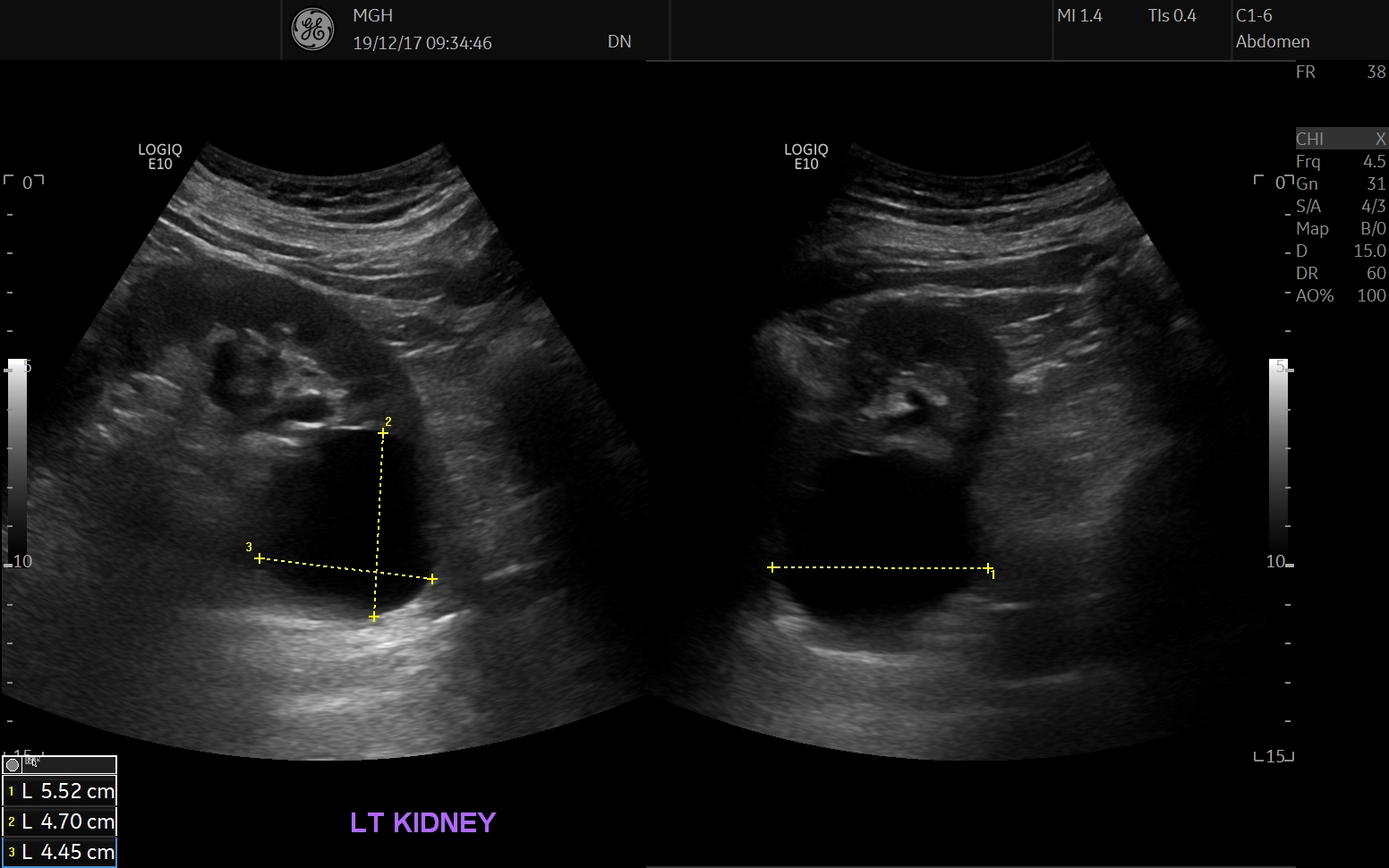
Renal cyst as seen on abdominal ultrasound

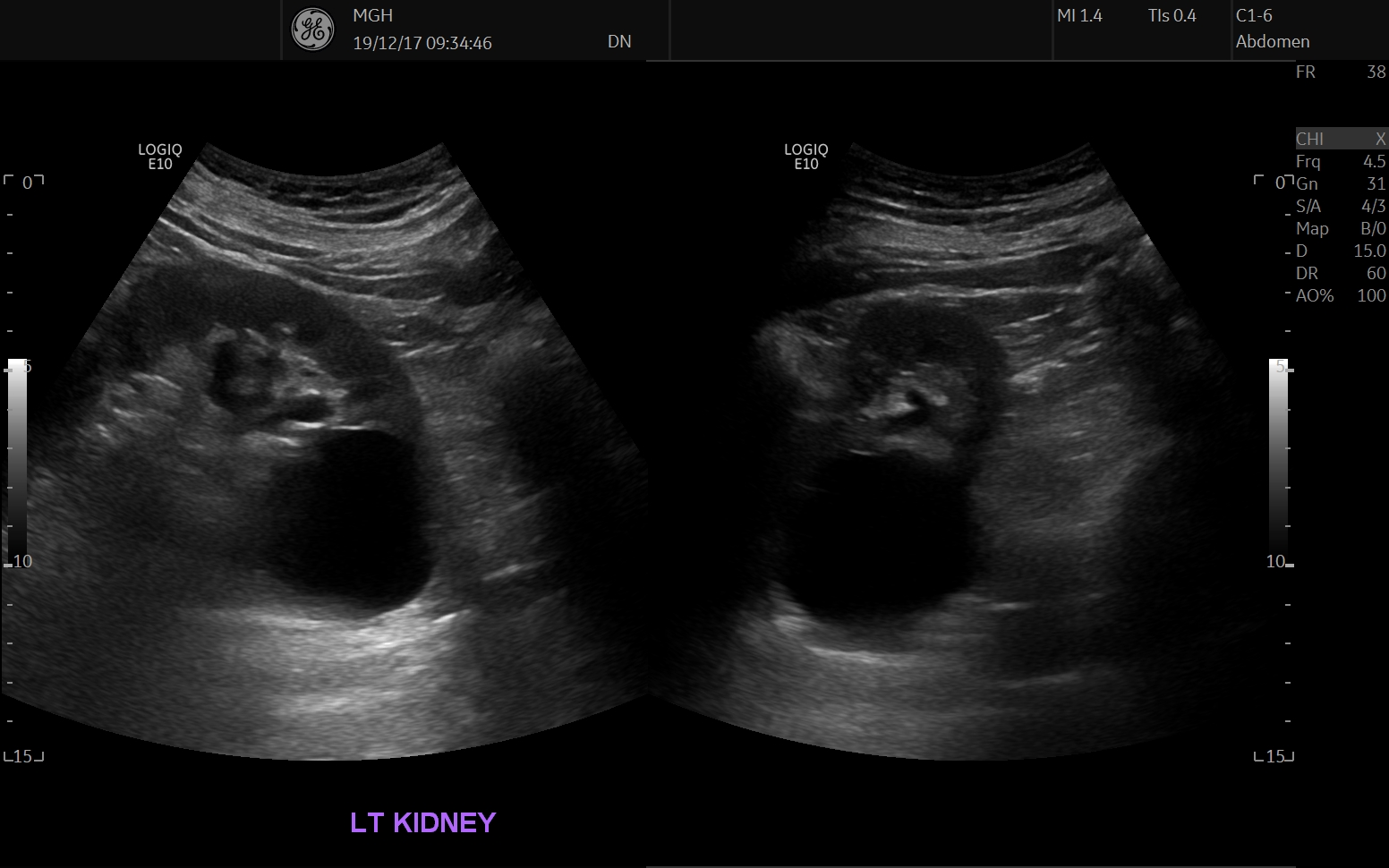
Renal cyst as seen on abdominal ultrasound

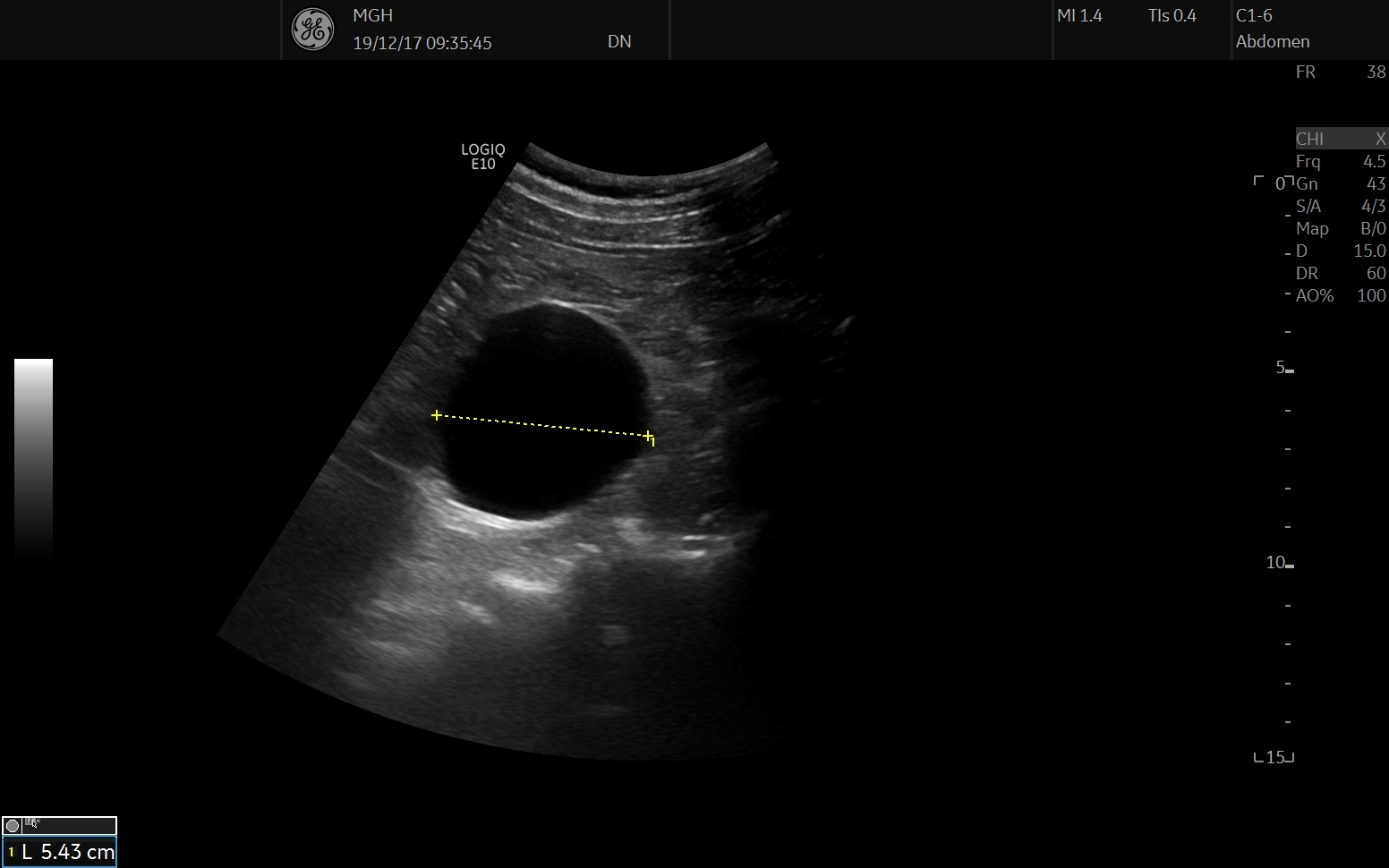
Renal cyst as seen on abdominal ultrasound

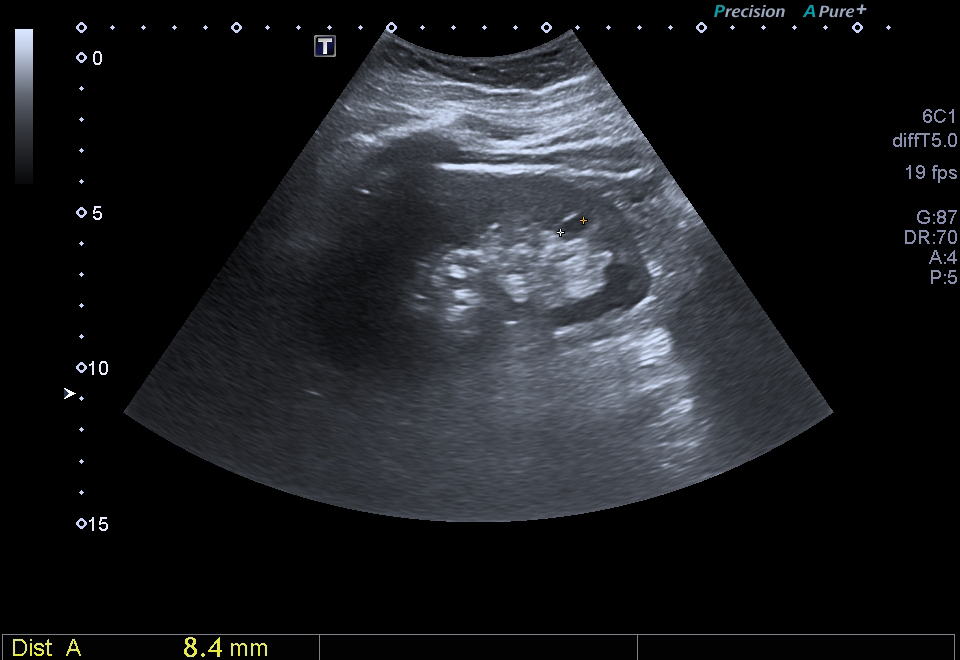
A very small (8 mm) simple renal cyst

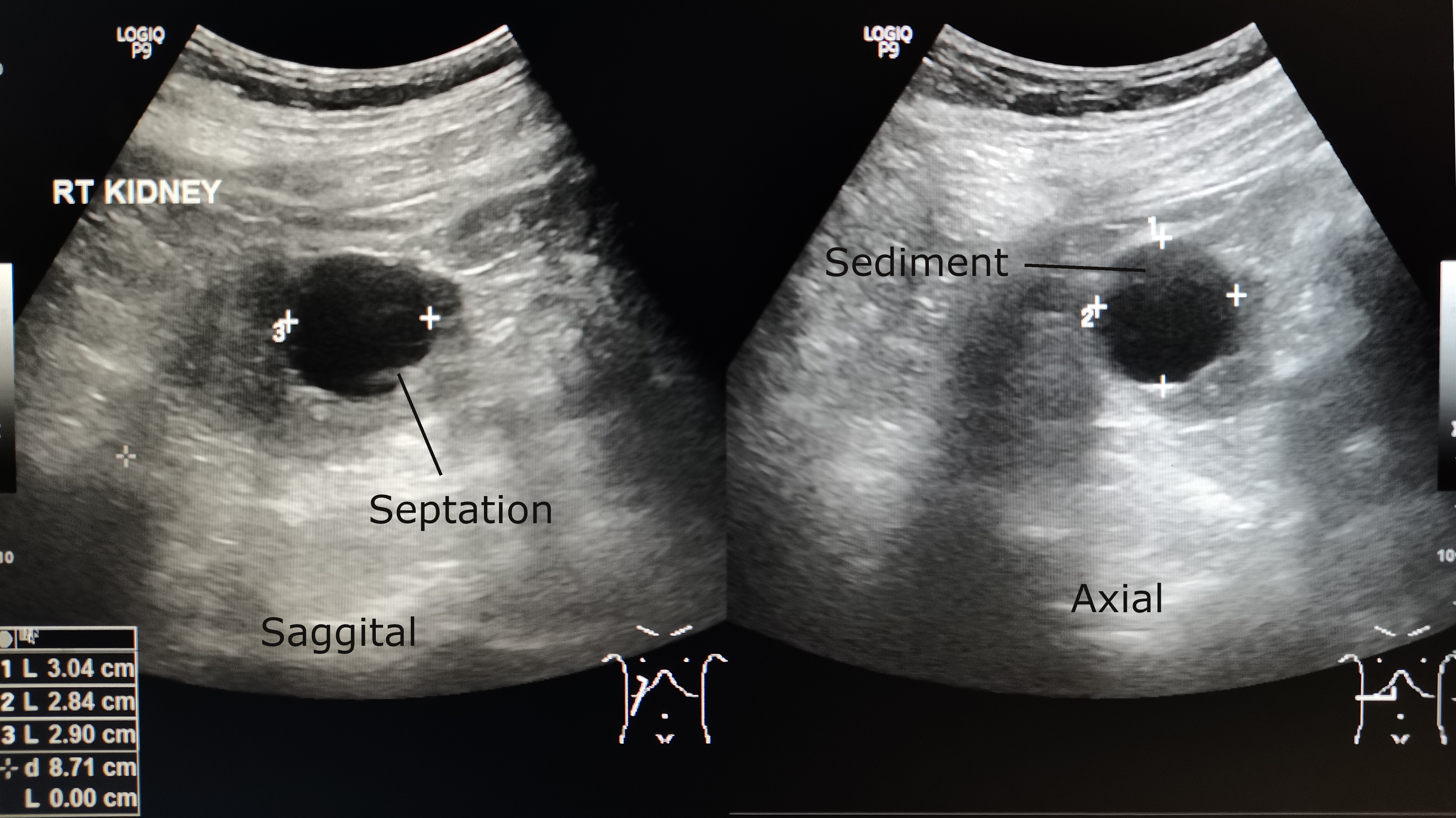
Bosniak II cyst at the lower pole of right kidney with septations within

== Treatment ==
This system is more directly focused on the most appropriate management. These alternatives are broadly to ignore the cyst, schedule follow-up or perform a surgical excision of it. When a cyst shows discrepancy in severity across categories, it is the most worrisome feature that is used in deciding about management. There is no established rule regarding the follow-up frequency, but one possibility is after 6 months, which can later be doubled if unchanged.

	Recommended management		
	Ignore	Follow	Excise
Calcification	Small, smooth and liquid (moves to lowest point when changing position)	Thick, nodular	
If radiodensity > 20 HU without radiocontrast	Sharp margin, < 3 cm, not completely intrarenal and homogenous; Must also be clearly cystic if seen on ultrasound	totally intrarenal; >3 cm	poorly defined; heterogeneous; solid on ultrasound
Septations	Thin and smooth	Slightly greater than hairline	thick; irregular; nodular
Enhancement (increase with radiocontrast)	< 10 HU	10–15 HU	> 15 HU
Multilocular		If infection	All others
Nodularity		Very small and nonenhancing	All others
Wall thickening		If infection	All others

=== Peripelvic versus parapelvic cysts ===
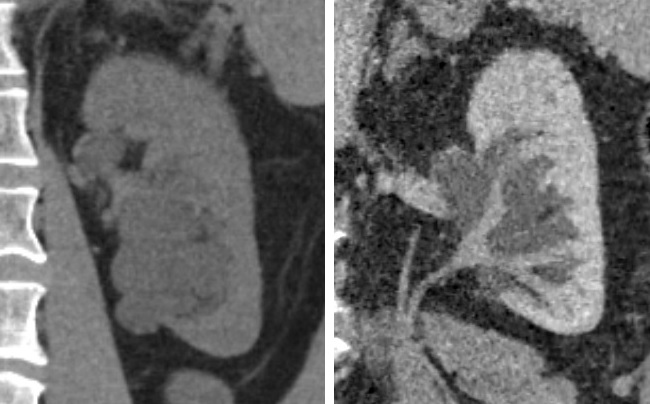
Non-contrast CT (at left) showing peripelvic fluid accumulations, which may be hydronephrosis. CT urography (at right) reveals non-dilated calyces and pelvises. The fluid accumulations are thus peripelvic cysts.

Parapelvic cysts originate from around the kidney at the adjacent renal parenchyma, and plunge into the renal sinus. Peripelvic cysts are contained entirely within the renal sinus, possibly related to dilated lymphatic channels. When viewed on CT in absence of contrast, they can mimic hydronephrosis. If symptomatic, they can be laparoscopically decorticated - removal of the outer layer or cortex.

== Epidemiology ==
Up to 27 percent of individuals older than 50 years may have simple renal cysts that cause no symptoms.

== See also ==
- Renal tumor
