= Morton A. Bosniak =

Radiologist and founder of Bosniak Classification System

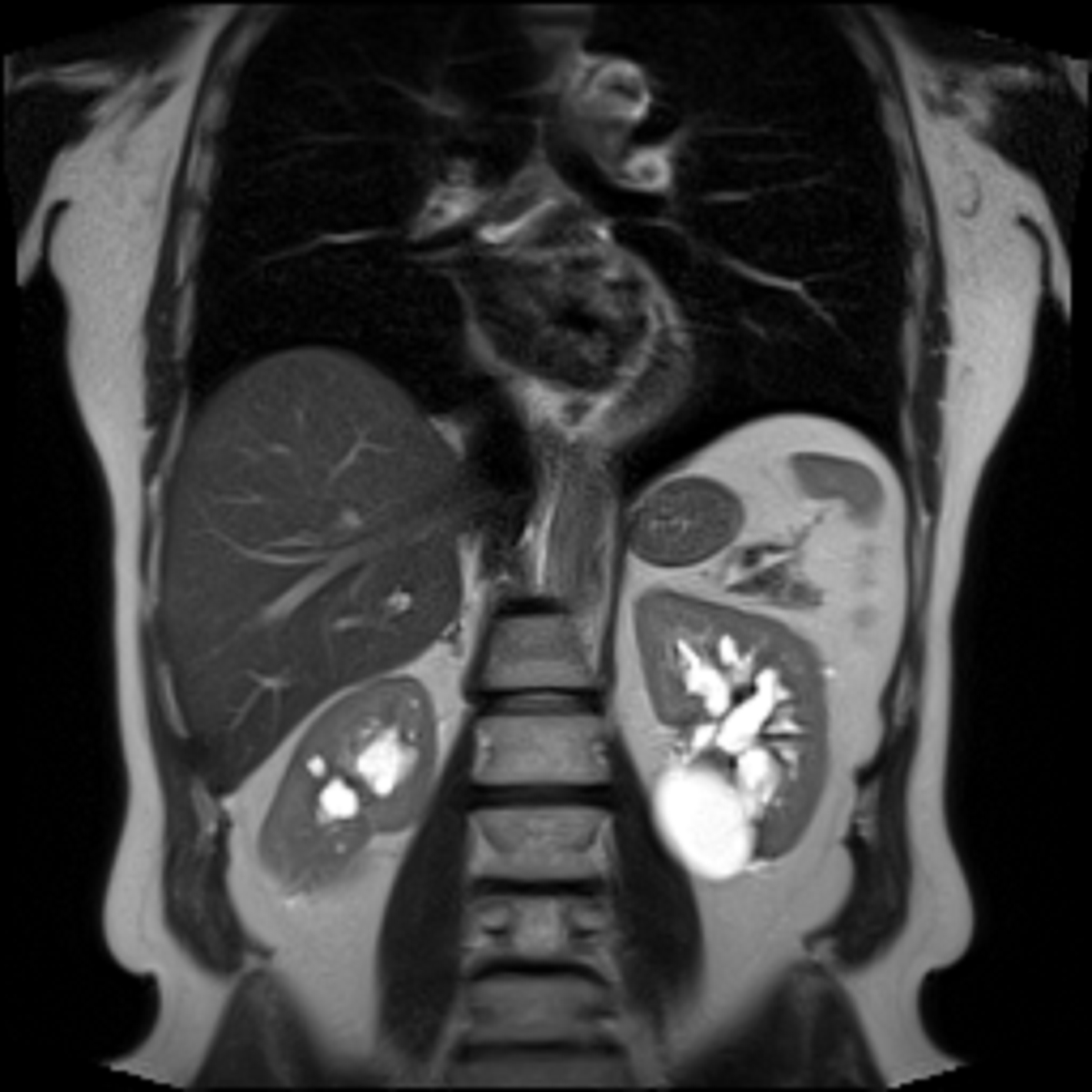
Bosniak, a radiologist, developed the Bosniak Classification system for renal cysts.

Morton A. Bosniak (born November 13, 1929 in New York City, died September 7, 2016 in New York City) was a radiologist best known for creating the Bosniak classification system of cystic renal masses.

== Education and training ==
Bosniak graduated from the Massachusetts Institute of Technology in 1951 with a Bachelor's of Science, and obtained his M.D. degree from the State University of New York (SUNY) Downstate Medical Center (Brooklyn, NY) in 1955. He began a radiology residency at New York Hospital (now Weill Cornell Medical Center), and spent two years in military service as a captain in the United States Air Force, before returning to complete his radiology residency.

== Career ==
He began his professional career in radiology in 1961 at Montefiore Medical Center in Bronx, NY. He held faculty positions at Montefiore Hospital, Boston University Medical School, and Albert Einstein School of Medicine. In 1969, he joined the New York University School of Medicine, where he stayed for the rest of his career, eventually retiring as Professor Emeritus of Radiology in 2002. During his tenure at NYU, he founded and chaired the Abdominal Imaging section at NYU, and created the first abdominal imaging fellowship in the United States. Bosniak served as president of the Society of Cardiovascular Imaging, the Society of Uroradiology, and the New York Roentgen Society.

== Impact ==
Bosniak was a pioneer in renal mass imaging, best known for developing a renal cyst classification system named in his honor. The Bosniak classification system for renal cysts has been widely adopted by radiologists and urologists as the gold standard for guiding the management of cystic renal lesions, sparing many patients from unnecessary surgery for benign lesions. Bosniak published works in many other aspects of genitourinary imaging, including renal angiography, and the safety of partial nephrectomy for renal cell carcinomas.

Bosniak published over 130 scientific papers, five textbooks, and over 30 book chapters over the course of his career. He was a visiting professor at over 120 different institutions. In 1981, he launched the first yearly NYU Head-To-Toe Body Imaging Conference, which hosted its 44th event in 2024. During his career at NYU, Bosniak mentored generations of trainees and faculty and helped launch the academic careers of many leaders in radiology. In retirement, as Professor Emeritus, he continued to teach incoming classes of radiology residents during lunchtime conferences, lectures and board reviews.

Since 2006, the Society for Abdominal Radiology has given an annual award named in his honor, the Morton A. Bosniak Research Award, in recognition of his contributions to advancing the subspecialty of Abdominal/Body imaging.

In 2017, the Radiological Society of North America (RSNA) dedicated its Annual Oration in Diagnostic Radiology in Bosniak's memory, at their yearly international RSNA conference in Chicago, Illinois.

== Awards ==
Bosniak received numerous awards, including the Radiological Society of North America (RSNA) Gold Medal in 1996, the New York Roentgen Society Distinguished Radiologist Award in 1998, and the Annual Gold Medal for the Society of Uroradiology in 2000. He posthumously received a Gold Medal from the Society of Computed Tomography and MR in September 2016.

== Personal life ==
Bosniak was born in New York City and was married to Tommie Hager Bosniak.

Bosniak died on September 7, 2016, while still a Professor Emeritus of Radiology at NYU Langone Medical Center.
