= AM-102 =

Clinical data
- Other names: AM102; AM-102 (Altamira Therapeutics)
- Drug class: NKCC1 inhibitor; Small molecule
- ATC code: none

Pharmacokinetic data
- Bioavailability: Not applicable
- Metabolism: Unknown
- Excretion: Unknown

AM-102 (also known as AM102) is an investigational small molecule drug candidate being developed by Altamira Therapeutics for the treatment of tinnitus.

== Development ==
According to company statements and patent filings, AM-102 acts as an inhibitor of the sodium–potassium–chloride co-transporter 1 (NKCC1), a mechanism thought to modulate neuronal chloride homeostasis involved in tinnitus perception.

The compound was developed by Altamira Therapeutics (formerly Auris Medical) in collaboration with King’s College London as part of a program to identify small-molecule drugs for tinnitus.

As of February 2024, there have been no publicly announced clinical trials or active development updates for AM-102 in tinnitus.

== Mechanism of action ==
AM-102 is reported to act via inhibition of the Na⁺K⁺2Cl⁻ co-transporter 1 (NKCC1), a transporter involved in chloride homeostasis in auditory cells.

By inhibiting NKCC1, it is hypothesised that the excitatory-inhibitory balance in inner-ear sensory neurons may be restored, potentially reducing the perception of tinnitus.

A relevant patent application describes the concept of NKCC1 antagonists for tinnitus, citing a link between injury-induced down-regulation of KCC2 (the chloride–potassium co-transporter) and tinnitus.

== Preclinical and clinical data ==
=== Preclinical studies ===
In animal models of noise-induced tinnitus (Mongolian gerbils), compounds of the NKCC1 inhibitor class significantly reduced behavioural markers of tinnitus and preserved inner hair-cell ribbon synapses.

=== Clinical development ===
While AM-102 specifically has limited disclosed trial data, a related compound AM‑101 (also from Auris Medical/Altamira) underwent a Phase-2 intratympanic study in tinnitus after noise trauma or otitis media.

The AM-101 study (0.81 mg/ml) showed statistically significant improvements for tinnitus loudness, annoyance, sleep disturbances and tinnitus impact, though the primary endpoint (minimum masking level) was not met.

== Patent and intellectual property ==
A patent application (ES2862673T3) describes the use of NKCC1 modulators (including bumetanide derivatives) for tinnitus treatment via chloride-transport modulation in auditory sensory cells. An allowed European patent application (NKCC1 inhibitor for tinnitus) was noted in Switzerland for Auris Medical in January 2020.

== Current considerations and outlook ==
Tinnitus remains a condition with high unmet medical need and no widely approved pharmacotherapy. Although AM-102 represents a mechanistically novel approach, its public development status appears stalled or undisclosed. Potential hurdles include demonstrating robust clinical efficacy, safety in humans, target engagement, and obtaining regulatory approval. Researchers also caution that preclinical models of tinnitus may not always predict human outcomes, so translation into meaningful patient benefit remains uncertain.

== See also ==
- List of investigational tinnitus drugs
