= List of investigational tinnitus drugs =

Investigational tinnitus drugs

This is a list of investigational tinnitus drugs, or drugs that are currently under development for clinical use in the treatment of tinnitus but are not yet approved.

Chemical/generic names are listed first, with developmental code names, synonyms, and brand names in parentheses. The format of list items is "Name (Synonyms) – Mechanism of Action [Reference]".

This list was last comprehensively updated in September 2025. It is likely to become outdated with time.

== Under development ==
=== Phase 2 ===
- Brexanolone (allopregnanolone; SAGE-547; SGE-102; Zulresso) – GABA_{A} receptor positive allosteric modulator and neurosteroid
- Ebselen (DR-3305; ebselene; ebseleno; ebselenum; harmokisane; PZ-51; SPI-1005; SPI-3005) – various actions

== Not under development ==
=== Suspended ===
- Esketamine ((S)-ketamine; AM-101; esketamine otic gel; Keyzilen) – ionotropic glutamate NMDA receptor antagonist

=== No development reported ===
- AM-102 (AM102) – sodium–potassium–chloride symporter inhibitor
- AUT-00063 – shaw potassium channel modulator
- Disufenton/acetylcysteine (disufenton/N-acetylcysteine; HPN-07/NAC; NHPN-1010; NXY-059/NAC) – free radical inhibitor and oxygen radical scavenger
- EGb-761 (GBE 761; Gingogink; Ginkgo biloba special extract; Tanakan; Tebonin; Tramisal) – various actions
- (R)-Ketoprofen – cyclooxygenase (COX) inhibitor and non-steroidal anti-inflammatory drug (NSAID)
- Research programme: fluorine-based therapeutics/radiolabelled diagnostics - OcuTerra Therapeutics (SF-0034) – various actions
- Seliforant (SENS-111; UR-63325) – histamine H_{4} receptor antagonist

=== Discontinued ===
- Gacyclidine intratympanic controlled release – ionotropic glutamate NMDA receptor antagonist
- Lidocaine transdermal patch (ADL-87223; LidoPAIN) – sodium channel blocker
- Neramexane (KRP-209; MRZ 2/579) – ionotropic glutamate NMDA receptor antagonist and nicotinic acetylcholine receptor negative allosteric modulator
- Selurampanel (BGG-492; BGG-492A) – ionotropic glutamate AMPA and kainate receptor antagonist
- Sodium phenylbutyrate slow-release (4-PB-D-alanin; LU-901; Lunaphen) – histone deacetylase (HDAC) inhibitor
- Vestipitant (GW-597599; GW-597599B) – neurokinin NK_{1} receptor antagonist

== Clinically used drugs ==
=== Approved drugs ===
- Caroverine (Spasmium, Tinnitin, Tinnex) – calcium channel blocker, NMDA receptor antagonist, and other actions
- Pentoxifylline (BL-191; Claudicat; Dospan Pento; Elorgan; oxpentifylline; Trental) – non-selective phosphodiesterase (PDE) inhibitor and adenosine receptor antagonist
- Trimetazidine (Adexor; Flavedon; Idaptan; Preductal; S-5016; Trimetazine; Vastarel; Vastinan) – long-chain 3-ketoacyl-CoA thiolase inhibitor and other actions

=== Off-label drugs ===
- Antidepressants (e.g., sertraline, nortriptyline, amitriptyline)
- Benzodiazepines (GABA_{A} receptor positive allosteric modulators) (e.g., alprazolam, clonazepam)
- Corticosteroids (e.g., dexamethasone)
- Gabapentinoids (α_{2}δ subunit-containing voltage-gated calcium channel ligands) (e.g., gabapentin)
- Others (e.g., acamprosate, melatonin)

== See also ==
- Lists of investigational drugs
