= Seliforant =

Clinical data
- Other names: SENS-111; SENS111; UR-63325; UR63325
- Routes of administration: Oral
- Drug class: Histamine H_{4} receptor antagonist

Legal status
- Legal status: Investigational

Identifiers
- CAS Number: 1164115-89-2
- PubChem CID: 44126305
- IUPHAR/BPS: 11072
- DrugBank: DB15220
- ChemSpider: 62848563
- UNII: B61N8R7TDH
- ChEMBL: ChEMBL5314396

Chemical and physical data
- Formula: C_{12}H_{21}N_{5}
- Molar mass: 235.335 g·mol^{−1}
- 3D model (JSmol): Interactive image
- SMILES: CC(C)CC1=NC(=CC(=N1)N2CC(C2)NC)N
- InChI: InChI=1S/C12H21N5/c1-8(2)4-11-15-10(13)5-12(16-11)17-6-9(7-17)14-3/h5,8-9,14H,4,6-7H2,1-3H3,(H2,13,15,16); Key:QRBVUFXEMHNIDB-UHFFFAOYSA-N

Seliforant (also known as SENS-111 or UR-63325) is an investigational small-molecule drug developed by Sensorion (originally by Palau Pharma) for inner-ear/vestibular disorders, particularly vertigo and vestibular neuritis, and has also been cited as having potential for tinnitus and hearing loss indications.

== Background and development ==
Seliforant was first developed as a first-in-class antagonist of the histamine H4 receptor (H4R), a receptor subtype implicated in immune modulation and potentially neurosensory signalling.

The drug was granted its International Non-Proprietary Name (INN) "seliforant" by the World Health Organization in 2018.

== Mechanism of action ==
Seliforant functions by antagonising the histamine H_{4} receptor (H4R). H4 receptors are expressed in several tissues including immune cells and may play roles in neurosensory signalling. The rationale for vestibular/ear indications is based on modulation of aberrant vestibular/inner-ear neuronal activity rather than conventional antihistamine pathways.

== Clinical trials and status ==
=== Vestibular disorders ===
A Phase 2 proof-of-concept trial (NCT03110458 / EudraCT 2016–003927–45) of seliforant in acute unilateral vestibulopathy was completed, but seliforant did not meet its primary efficacy endpoint.

Earlier Phase 2a trials in healthy volunteers assessing tolerability and pharmacodynamics reported that seliforant met tolerability endpoints (no sedation from anticholinergic effects) but efficacy in patients remains unsupported.

== Safety ==
In human Phase 1/2 volunteer studies, seliforant was reported to be well tolerated, with mild to moderate events and no sedation reported.

== See also ==
- List of investigational tinnitus drugs
