= Volume of distribution =

Theoretical drug measure in pharmacology

In pharmacology, the volume of distribution ($V_D$, also known as apparent volume of distribution or volume of dilution) is the theoretical volume that would be necessary to contain the total amount of an administered drug at the same concentration that it is observed in the blood plasma.

Roughly speaking, the $V_D$, as a property of a drug, measures the degree to which it is distributed in body tissue rather than the blood plasma. Drug properties which cause high $V_D$ include high lipid solubility (non-polarity), low rates of ionization, or low plasma protein binding capabilities. Disease states which increase $V_D$ include kidney failure (due to fluid retention) and liver failure (due to altered body fluid and plasma protein binding). Conversely, dehydration may decrease $V_D$.

The initial volume of distribution describes blood concentrations prior to attaining the apparent volume of distribution and uses the same formula.

== Motivation and equation ==
Suppose one administers an amount of drug $D$ intravascularly, then measures the drug concentration in blood $C_0$ (assuming enough time has elapsed for the drug to distribute, but not enough time for elimination). The volume of distribution is the quotient:

$V_D = \frac{D}{C_0}$

If the drug remains entirely intravascularly, $V_D$ will be identical to the blood volume $V_{blood}$. However, if a drug diffuses out of the intravascular space into the tissues or interstitium, the measured concentration will be lower-than-expected compared to a hypothetical intravascular-only drug. Therefore, $V_D>V_{blood}$, with a higher $V_D$ value corresponding to a greater tendency for the drug to exit the intravascular space.

One clinical utility is that the dose required $D$ to achieve a target plasma concentration $C_0$ can be determined if the $V_D$ for that drug is known.

The $V_D$ is not a physiological value; it is more a reflection of how a drug will distribute throughout the body depending on several physicochemical properties such as solubility, charge, size, etc.

The unit for $V_D$ may be reported extensively in litres (for a patient of given weight), or intensively as litres-per-kilogram.

The $V_D$ may also be used to determine how readily a drug will displace into the body tissue compartments relative to the blood:

$${V_{D}} = {V_{P}} + {V_{T}} \left(\frac{f_{u_P}}{f_{u_T}}\right)$$

Where:

- $V_P$: plasma volume
- $V_T$: apparent tissue volume
- $f_{u_P}$: fraction unbound in plasma
- $f_{u_T}$: fraction unbound in tissue

== Examples ==
For example, chloroquine has much greater affinity for body fat than blood, resulting in a $V_D\approx250L/kg$ compared to $V_{blood}\approx 0.08L/kg$.

Example $V_D$ values for a 70 kg man, with approximate blood volume 5-6L.
| Drug | $V_D$ | Comments |
| Warfarin | 8 L | Reflects a high degree of plasma protein binding, which sequesters the drug in the intravascular space. |
| Theophylline, Ethanol | 30 L | Represents distribution in total body water. |
| Chloroquine | 15000 L | Shows highly lipophilic molecules which sequester into total body fat. |
| NXY-059 | 8 L | Highly charged hydrophilic molecule. |
