= Ultrasound Localization Microscopy =

Advanced ultrasound imaging technique

Ultrasound Localization Microscopy (ULM) is an advanced ultrasound technique used for animal and human imaging. By localizing microbubbles, ULM overcomes the physical limit of diffraction, achieving sub-wavelength level resolution and qualifying as a super-resolution technique.

ULM is primarily utilized in vascular imaging. Because of its deep penetration depth and high resolution, micro-vessels deep within the tissue become visible, down to the capillary bed. This capability gives ULM a significant advantage in diagnosing diseases associated with microvascular development and angiogenesis, such as cancer, diabetes, and certain neurodegenerative diseases.

== Principle ==
ULM animation with progressive reconstruction of a rat brain's vascularity.

In imaging, resolution is the shortest distance between two structures that can be distinguished from each other. As in optical imaging, the resolution of ultrasound imaging is linked to the wavelength due to interference effects within this spatial scale. Depending on the imaging configuration and direction, the resolution limit is approximately half a wavelength. In ultrasound medical imaging, these wavelengths are on the order of millimeters, which often limits the resolution to a few hundred micrometers. Shortening the wavelength improves spatial resolution; however, this comes at the cost of increased attenuation, as higher-frequency waves (which correspond to shorter wavelengths) are more strongly absorbed or scattered by the medium.

Super-resolution imaging is the ability to distinguish objects closer than the diffraction limit. In optical microscopy, several super-resolution techniques have been proposed, such as STED, SOFI, or single-molecule localization microscopy (SMLM). The 2014 Nobel Prize in Chemistry was awarded for the development of these techniques. SMLM relies on the light emission from several nearby fluorophores at separate times. Since they do not interfere, their positions can be localized with subwavelength precision. The image resulting from the accumulation of these localizations is super-resolved.

ULM (Ultrasound Localization Microscopy) is the ultrasound analogue of SMLM. It uses microbubbles that scatter ultrasound waves, rather than fluorophores, which emit light. As microbubbles remains intravascular, their localization and tracking can yield a super-resolve map of the blood vessels. ULM requires multiple image frames that highlight microbubbles (MBs) and approximates the real vasculature by accumulating the located centroids of MBs across the frames. MBs, typically far smaller than the transmitted wavelength, act as point reflectors/emitters of ultrasonic waves, which re-emit waves in a nonlinear fashion. As such, their reflected ultrasound signals are strong and separable from the surrounding tissue, which has the effect of highlighting microvasculature. Their signals, however, are still subject to the diffraction limit, meaning that when two MBs are too close to each other (at a distance shorter than half of the transmitted wavelength), they become indistinguishable.

ULM overcomes this limitation by controlling the sparsity of MBs to ensure minimal interference or overlap in their responses. Computation techniques are then applied to determine the location of each MB, specifically the centroid of its response. The accumulation of these located centroids should closely resemble the actual vasculature.

The general workflow can be summarized as follows:

1. Acquire a video of the target area where MBs are flowing;
2. Isolate the MB signal from the surrounding tissue in each video frame;
3. Locate the centers of the isolated MBs;
4. Optional: Track the movement of each MB across the frames;
5. Accumulate the located centroids from all frames to form an image.

=== Microbubble Localization ===
The detection process in ULM focuses exclusively on signals originating from microbubbles (MBs), as background signals can impair the accuracy of localization and MB tracking. It is crucial to obtain clear images of MBs before proceeding with any downstream processing. Notably, MBs are in motion within vessels, whereas the surrounding tissue remains mostly static after motion correction. This spatial-temporal difference is captured in both the radio-frequency (RF) data and the consecutive frames of the acquired video. Different localization algorithms can be used to locate the MBs:

1. Deterministic

Common algorithms include frame-to-frame subtraction and singular value decomposition. The performance of different algorithms depends on the image data type and application. A benchmark comparison from 2022 ranks the performance of deterministic MB localization methods noting that Radial Symmetry and Gaussian fitting were the two localization algorithms consistently rated highly on every quantitative index; however, Gaussian fitting was almost 50 times slower than Radial Symmetry. As an alternative, trilateration based on RF data bypasses computational beamforming and shows promise to refine scatterer positions.

1. Deep Learning

With the increasing popularity of deep neural networks, their adoption for ULM generally improves the reliability of MB detection. To overcome long ULM processing times, networks are directly trained on RF data to precisely pinpoint wavefronts and skip beamforming.

Ultrasound Localization and tracking of microbubbles flowing through the microcirculation of a rat brain.

=== Tracking ===
Because MBs are exclusively intravascular, microbubble displacement can be interpolated between different localizations along a path. Essentially, if a series of localizations are close enough to one another in some limited number of successive frames, those localizations can be assumed to be the same microbubble along a certain path, and the path of those microbubbles may be interpolated from the data. Thus, the velocity and direction of the microbubbles (and thus blood) can be determined at a micrometer scale.

Difficulties arise with MB tracking with regard to limited microbubble detection; for example, a vessel with only a single microbubble detected might appear to be a 5 micrometer capillary but instead be a larger arteriole. As such, a certain number of tracks is necessary to properly image a vessel of a certain depth; that number is equal to the width of the vessel divided by the super-resolved pixel size. This further feeds into the balancing act of microbubble concentration—more microbubbles means more signals and localizations, but too many microbubbles will also restrict the efficacy of localization, reducing the super-resolution capabilities.

=== Motion Correction ===
Usually, there is an additional motion correction step to adjust for deformations caused by living subject. The motion artifact can be particularly problematic for clinical use. Though ULM achieves resolutions under 10 micrometers, "motion in the body or from the ultrasound transducer can be several orders of magnitudes beyond this level". For example, body motion could be on the scale of 0.5 mm, while ULM resolutions may be 5 to 10 micrometers. In addition, ULM requires "many localizations over many frames"—in other words, image acquisition times on the timescale of minutes with kilohertz frame rates. The movement to resolution ratio and long acquisition times required for ULM mean that motion correction is vitally important to improving the achievable image quality.

== Applications ==
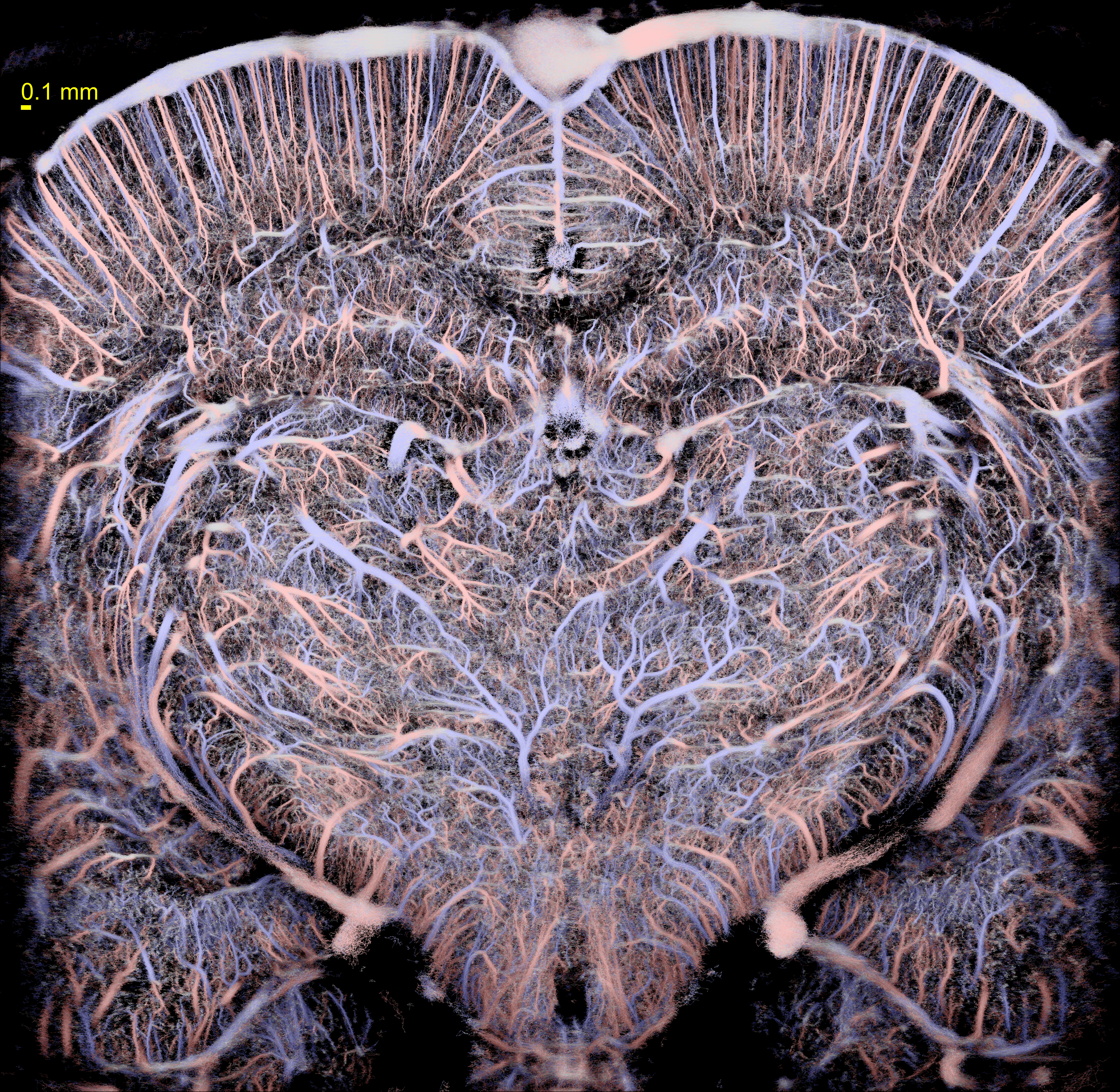
Ultrasound Localization Microscopy (ULM) of a rat brain with blood flow directions

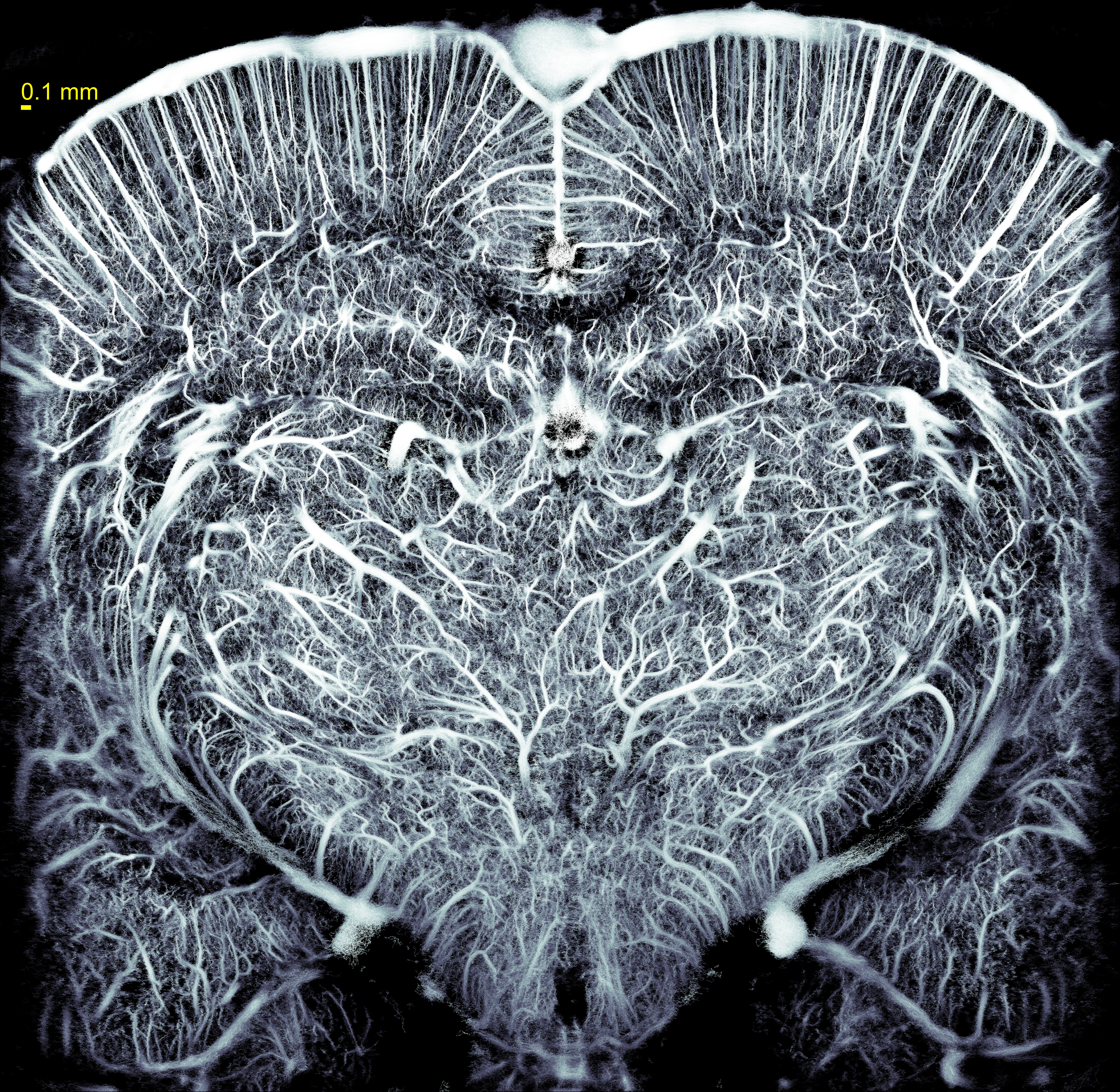
Ultrasound Localization Microscopy (ULM) of a rat brain (Amplitude contrast).

ULM provides "unprecedentedly detailed in-vivo microvascular architectures and robust hemodynamic parameters", and does so without Doppler angle dependence. In contrast to CEUS, ULM provides typically a 10x improvement in image resolution and provides direct and quantitative data regarding blood flow speed. In practice, ULM may be performed in addition to CEUS, as CEUS can be performed in real-time while ULM requires post-processing of data.

Common clinical applications which could benefit from the addition of ULM include imaging microvasculature in developing tumors, microvasculature imaging in liver/kidney disease, and microvasculature imaging of rheumatoid arthritis. Much research is currently being performed with regard to ULM for the imaging of brain microvasculature and coronary microvasculature, where the 10x improvement in resolution over CEUS and direct, quantitative hemodynamic information is critical to gleaning information with regard to microvascular structure and hemodynamic properties.

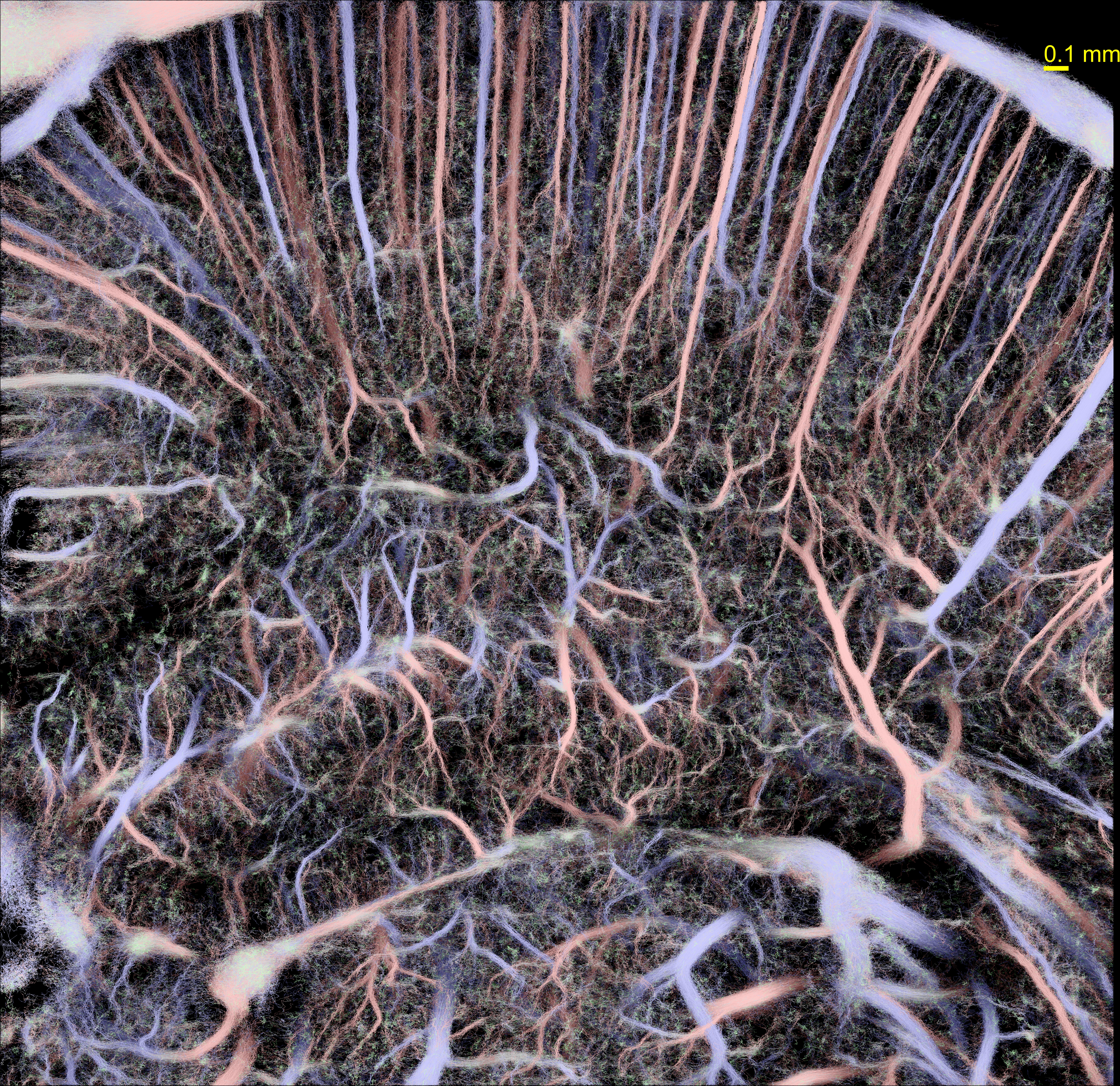
Ultrasound Localization Microscopy (ULM) of a rat brain with remanence mapped in green (axial flow directions in red and blue)

However, ULM has significant barriers in regard to common clinical application, namely high frame rates and intense computational demands. This is because ULM requires many localizations over many frames. As such, kilohertz frame rates over minutes are necessary to acquire a ULM dataset. This requires not only time and appropriate hardware but also an understanding of the proper MB concentrations for clinical use, which differs depending on the selected commercial contrast agents. Indeed, "complete control of the MB concentration in the blood stream cannot be achieved, and this varies in different organs, applications and patients, and in the different brands of MBs administered. Meanwhile, the 'ideal' MB concentration and MB count necessary for robust ULM imaging remains elusive, and requires further investigation". Furthermore, imaging validation for ULM in-vivo damage is currently limited, lacking a gold-standard. ULM also cannot be performed in real-time, as significant post-processing of data is required to actually reconstruct an image, which has a significant computational cost and is accordingly temporally expensive.

== See also ==
- Contrast-enhanced ultrasound
- Ultrasound
