= BIIB131 =

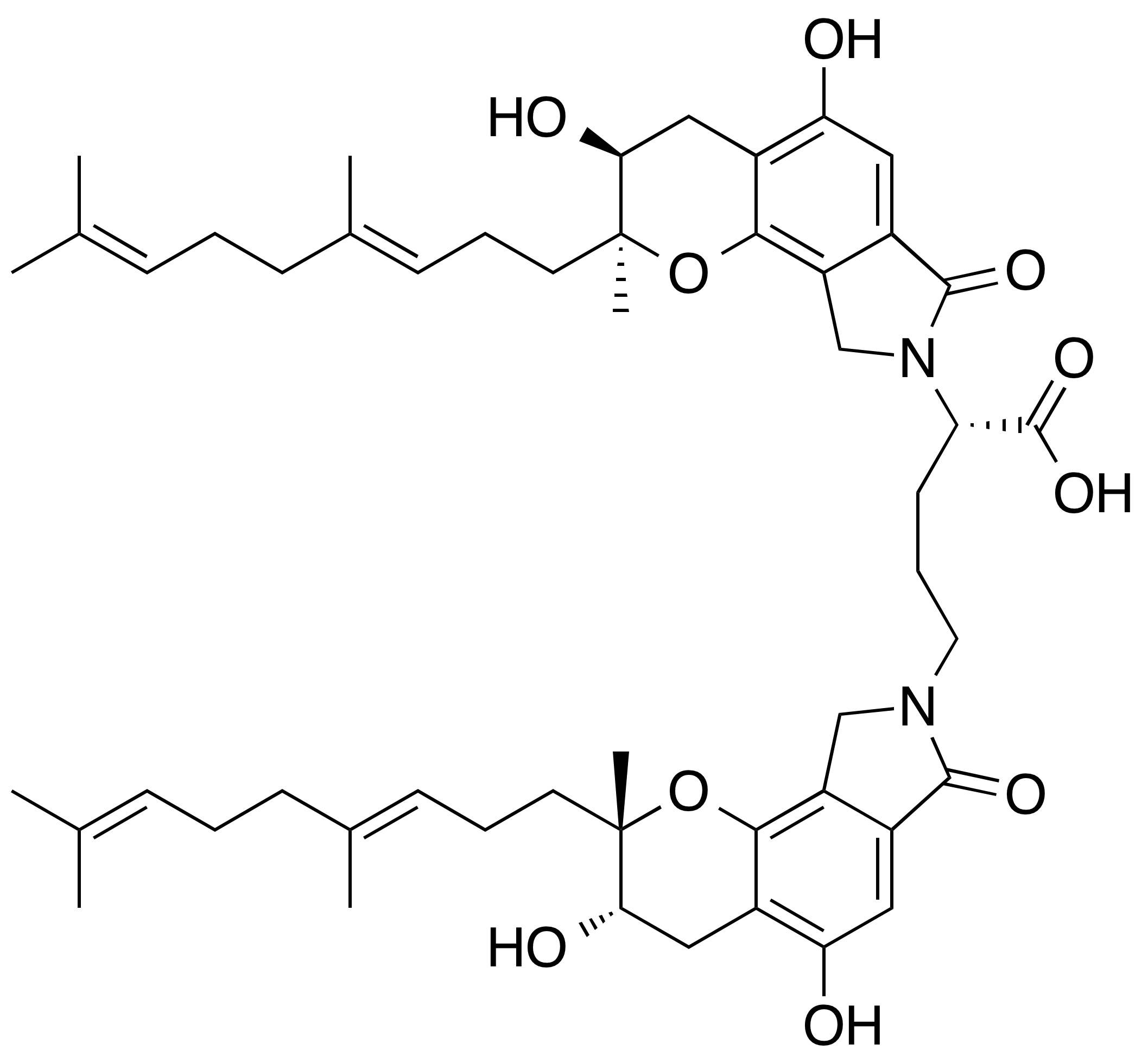

Names
- IUPAC name (2S)-2,5-bis[(2S,3S)-2-[(3E)-4,8-dimethylnona-3,7-dienyl]-3,5-dihydroxy-2-methyl-7-oxo-4,9-dihydro-3H-pyrano[2,3-e]isoindol-8-yl]pentanoic acid
- Other names: SMTP-7; TMS-007

Identifiers
3D model (JSmol)	Interactive image
PubChem CID	50898407
- InChI: InChI=1S/C51H68N2O10/c1-30(2)14-9-16-32(5)18-11-21-50(7)43(56)26-36-41(54)24-34-38(45(36)62-50)28-52(47(34)58)23-13-20-40(49(60)61)53-29-39-35(48(53)59)25-42(55)37-27-44(57)51(8,63-46(37)39)22-12-19-33(6)17-10-15-31(3)4/h14-15,18-19,24-25,40,43-44,54-57H,9-13,16-17,20-23,26-29H2,1-8H3,(H,60,61)/b32-18+,33-19+/t40-,43-,44-,50-,51-/m0/s1 Key: CRNDCHORWGDFGR-PXTWCNKMSA-N
- SMILES: CC(=CCC/C(=C/CC[C@]1([C@H](CC2=C(C=C3C(=C2O1)CN(C3=O)CCC[C@@H](C(=O)O)N4CC5=C6C(=C(C=C5C4=O)O)C[C@@H]([C@](O6)(C)CC/C=C(\C)/CCC=C(C)C)O)O)O)C)/C)C

Properties
Chemical formula	C_{51}H_{68}N_{2}O_{10}
Molar mass	869.109 g·mol^{−1}
- Except where otherwise noted, data are given for materials in their standard state (at 25 °C [77 °F], 100 kPa). Infobox references

BIIB131 (also known as SMTP-7 or TMS-007) is a prothrombolytic small-molecule drug developed by Biogen for acute ischemic stroke.
