= 3K3A-Activated Protein C =

Experimental drug for the treatment of stroke

Clinical data
- Other names: 3K3A-APC
- Routes of administration: Intravenous

Legal status
- Legal status: Investigational

Identifiers
- CAS Number: 1421330-93-9

3K3A-Activated Protein C (3K3A-APC) is an experimental drug for the treatment of stroke developed by ZZ Biotech, a company founded by Berislav Zlokovic.

It is a genetically engineered variant of activated protein C designed to reduce anticoagulant activity while preserving its cytoprotective and anti-inflammatory properties. This recombinant protein is created by substituting three lysine residues with alanines, thereby minimizing the risk of bleeding associated with native activated protein C. 3K3A-APC exerts its therapeutic effects by targeting protease-activated receptor 1 (PAR1) pathway.

A Phase 3 clinical trial was scheduled to start when the NIH paused the trial on November 16, 2023, due to concerns about falsification of data in the studies supporting the clinical trial. The drug was also being assessed for the treatment of Alzheimer's disease, and is currently being evaluated by Dermatherix for wound care.

== In stroke treatment ==
The only drug currently approved for stroke treatment is tPA, which can cause dangerous brain bleeding. In 2005, Griffin et al proposed using Activated Protein C in conjunction with tPA to protect the brain from tPA’s harmful side-effects. APC activates protease-activated receptor 1 (PAR-1), which plays a role in the interaction of coagulation and inflammation. The 3K3A-APC was designed to have more activity at protease-activated receptor 1 (PAR-1) and less anticoagulative effect than activated protein C.

The phase 2 trial, RHAPSODY, was performed in the lab of Berislav Zlokovic, the scientific founder of ZZ Biotech, to determine safety and tolerability of the drug. A phase 3 $30 million trial, RHAPSODY-2, was planned to determine safety and efficacy for treatment of ischemic stroke. However, on November 16, 2023, the National Institutes of Health (NIH) paused the start of the human trial of 3K3A-APC after an investigation by Science Magazine.

== Controversy ==
The investigation by Science and the NIH was triggered by whistleblowers who delivered a 113 page dossier to Science. The dossier presented evidence that patients treated with 3K3A-APC died at a higher rate in the first week following treatment than those on the placebo (6 out of 66 versue 1 out 44). Also, patients on the drug suffered more disability. The dossier also claimed that data had been doctored in dozens of papers from Zlokovic's lab.

Wade Smith, a University of California, San Francisco neurologist and StrokeNet principal investigator said that “I think pausing the trial until any impact of potential impropriety in preclinical drug testing is resolved to ensure the compound is safe for humans is the correct pathway to follow. This drug may work in humans so discarding it would be a shame,” he adds. “Alternatively, moving forward with a compound that may be unsafe is worse.”

== Other uses ==
In 2019, the Alzheimer’s drug discovery foundation suggested studying the drug for benefits for Alzheimer’s patients.

In 2021, a phase 2 trial began at Macquarie University in Sydney, Australia, for treatment of ALS.

Currently, Dermatherix is a biotech company studying the use of 3K3A-SPC for wound therapy.
