= AUT-00063 =

AUT00063

Clinical data
- Other names: AUT-00063
- Routes of administration: Oral
- Drug class: Small molecule; Kv3 potassium-channel modulator
- ATC code: none

Legal status
- Legal status: Investigational

Identifiers
- IUPAC name: 5,5-Dimethyl-3-[6-[(4-methyl-3,4-dihydro-2H-chromen-5-yl)oxy]-3-pyridinyl]imidazolidine-2,4-dione
- PubChem CID: 57410704

Chemical and physical data
- Formula: C_{20}H_{21}N_{3}O_{4}
- Molar mass: 367.405 g·mol^{−1}

AUT00063 (also called AUT-00063) is an investigational small-molecule compound developed by Autifony Therapeutics for hearing loss and tinnitus.

== Background and development ==
AUT00063 was identified as a modulator of Kv3 (Shaw) family potassium channels, which play a role in the firing properties of auditory neurons and are implicated in central auditory hyper-activity hypotheses of tinnitus.

In June 2014 Autifony announced that it had been awarded a £2.2 million grant from the UK's Technology Strategy Board (now Innovate UK) toward a Phase IIa clinical trial in tinnitus patients.

== Clinical trials ==
=== Tinnitus (QUIET-1) ===
A randomised, double-blind, placebo-controlled Phase IIa study (EudraCT 2014–002179–27) titled "QUIET-1" enrolled participants with subjective tinnitus to assess efficacy and safety of AUT00063 versus placebo.

However, the trial was terminated early for futility: Autifony announced on 28 April 2016 that headline data from QUIET-1 "confirm lack of efficacy of AUT00063 in the treatment of people with mild-to-moderate tinnitus.".

== Mechanism of action ==
AUT00063 targets Kv3 (Shaw) potassium channels, which are voltage-gated channels expressed in the central auditory pathway and help control rapid repolarization and high-frequency firing of neurons. By modulating these channels, the drug aimed to reduce abnormal spontaneous activity (a proposed substrate of tinnitus) in central auditory circuits.

== See also ==
- List of investigational tinnitus drugs
