= EGb-761 =

Clinical data
- Trade names: Gingogink; Tebonin; Tramisal
- Other names: GBE 761; Ginkgo biloba special extract; EGb761
- Routes of administration: Oral
- ATC code: N06AX07 (WHO)

Legal status
- Legal status: OTC in some territories / dietary supplement‐status in others

Pharmacokinetic data
- Bioavailability: Not fully established
- Metabolism: Not fully established

Identifiers
- CAS Number: (for Ginkgo biloba extract) 90045-36-6 (for Ginkgo biloba extract)
- UNII: 19FUJ2C58T

EGb-761 (also written EGb 761, branded Gingogink, Tebonin, Tramisal) is a standardised extract of the leaves of the tree Ginkgo biloba, containing flavonoid glycosides and terpene lactones, and used in some countries for symptoms such as cognitive decline, peripheral circulatory disorders, tinnitus and vertigo.

== Mechanism of action ==
The pharmacological effects of EGb-761 are attributed to multiple mechanisms: antioxidant and free-radical-scavenging actions, modulation of micro-circulation (hemorheological effects), protective effects on mitochondrial function, and possible effects on neuronal signalling and excitotoxicity.

In relation to auditory disorders and tinnitus, it has been proposed that EGb-761 may help stabilize inner-ear microcirculation, reduce oxidative stress, and modulate neuro-auditory pathways.

A systematic review concluded that "there is evidence of efficacy for the standardised extract, EGb 761, ... in the treatment of tinnitus".

== See also ==
- List of investigational tinnitus drugs
