= Perfluorocarbon emulsions =

Perfluorocarbon emulsions are emulsions containing either bubbles or droplets which have perfluorocarbons inside them. Some of them are commonly used in medicine as ultrasound contrast agents, and others have been studied for use as oxygen therapeutics.

== Ultrasound contrast agents ==
The most common use of perfluorocarbon emulsions is as ultrasound contrast agents. In this application, microscopic bubbles containing perfluorocarbon gas are injected intravenously and flow through the bloodstream. An ultrasound machine then sends soundwaves through a tissue of interest, and the bubbles reflect the soundwaves to a greater extent than the surrounding tissues, thereby giving the blood greater contrast on ultrasound viewers. This can allow greater visibility of the structure of an organ of interest, or a better indication of the level of blood perfusion or blood volume in an area of interest. The bubbles persist in the blood stream with half-lives of minutes before the perfluorocarbon molecules leave the bubbles and enter the surrounding fluids, before eventually passing through the lungs where they are exhaled. Notable ultrasound contrast agents include Definity and Optison which are FDA approved, Sonazoid which is approved in Japan, and EchoGen which was formerly approved in Europe but never marketed.

== Oxygen therapeutics ==
Other perfluorocarbon emulsions have been tested as oxygen therapeutics. When perfluorocarbons are exposed to high concentrations of oxygen, large amounts of oxygen dissolve into the perfluorocarbons. If the perfluorocarbon/oxygen solution is then exposed to a low oxygen environment, then oxygen diffuses out of the solution. Three different approaches sought to utilize this characteristic to improve oxygen delivery to tissue.

Early perfluorocarbon emulsions for oxygen delivery were developed as blood substitutes. They used large-molecule perfluorocarbons with boiling points higher than body temperature which were formed into liquid emulsion droplets. The emulsions were injected intravenously and circulated through the bloodstream, and the droplets picked up oxygen when passing through the lungs and offloaded oxygen when passing through the capillaries in other tissues. The primary form of excretion of the perfluorocarbon was through the reticulo-endothelial system: the droplets would remain in the bloodstream until recognized by the immune system, taken up by phagocytes, and broken down, ultimately being exhaled through the lungs. These high boiling point perfluorocarbons typically had half-lives measured in hours or days. Relatively large doses were required, but such doses could have side effects including pneumonia. Despite these challenges, Fluosol-DA was approved by the FDA and was marketed as a blood substitute in the United States from 1989 through 1994 when it was withdrawn from the market due to poor sales. Perftoran was approved in the Soviet Union in 1994 and remained in limited use in Russia at least as late as 2019.

The second approach to oxygen delivery tested a perfluorocarbon emulsion not as a blood substitute, but rather as a cerebrospinal fluid (CSF) substitute. In order to increase oxygen delivery to the brains of patients that had reduced blood flow due to acute ischemic stroke, artificial CSF mixed with pre-oxygenated perfluorocarbon emulsion was continuously added into the skull by a ventricular catheter while CSF was continuously removed by a lumbar catheter. Animal studies in cats with acute ischemic stroke showed very strong results, so a clinical trial in four humans was conducted. All four patients survived for 30 days to 2 years before dying of other causes. Enrollment in the trial was slow however, which caused the funding for the project to be cut.

A third approach to oxygen delivery is to move perfluorocarbon molecules into positions where they can enhance the flow of oxygen through the lower parts of the oxygen cascade. While it is difficult to observe the positioning of the perfluorocarbon molecules directly, molecules positioned in the right places between red blood cells and mitochondria may reduce resistance to oxygen flow. In cases where the oxygen tension at the mitochondria are very low, this would expose nearby red blood cells to lower oxygen tensions and cause them to offload more oxygen as described by the oxygen–hemoglobin dissociation curve. The most notable example is dodecafluoropentane emulsion (DDFPe, formerly EchoGen, now NanO_{2}). The drug is injected intravenously then the perfluorocarbon molecules spread widely before eventually passing through the lungs whey they are evaporated and exhaled. The drug showed very strong results in animal studies of acute ischemic stroke, heart attack and other indications. The drug was tested in a Phase Ib/II clinical trial in 24 patients who had reduced blood flow to the brain due to acute ischemic stroke, where it was intended to increase oxygen delivery to the brain to keep the tissue alive until blood flow could be normalized. The high dose group of patients in the clinical trial had improved functional independence compared to placebo, though the number of patients tested was small and there were confounding factors including differences in stroke severity, so larger clinical trials are needed to confirm the effect. Another perfluorocarbon, perfluorooctyl bromide, has been shown in animal studies to collect in tumor tissue and increase oxygenation of those tumors, potentially by improving the flow of oxygen from red blood cells.

=== Notable perfluorocarbon emulsions ===
Table 1: Notable perfluorocarbon emulsions and their properties
Perfluorocarbon(s)	Boiling Point (°C)	Bubble or Droplet	Scientific name of Perfluorocarbon	Trade Names of Emulsion	Company	Primary Uses	Status
C_{3}F_{8}	-36.7	Bubble	Octafluoropropane, or perflutren	Definity, Luminity, Optison	Lantheus Medical Imaging, GE Healthcare	Ultrasound Contrast Agents	Approved in the US and Europe
C_{4}F_{10}	-1.9	Bubble	Perfluorobutane	Sonazoid	Daiichi Sankyo	Ultrasound Contrast Agent	Approved in Japan, available in Korea, Norway, Taiwan, and China
C_{5}F_{12}	29	Bubble and/or Droplet	Dodecafluoropentane Emulsion, DDFPe	NanO_{2}, NVX-108, NVX-208, EchoGen	NuvOx Pharma, Sonus Pharmaceuticals	Oxygen Therapeutic - Oxygen Flow Enhancer, or Ultrasound Contrast Agent	Phase Ib/II complete in acute ischemic stroke
C_{8}Cl_{2}F_{16}	115	Droplet	Perfluorodichlorooctane	Oxyfluor	HemaGen	Oxygen Therapeutic - Blood Substitute	Discontinued during Phase II trial
C_{8}BrF_{17}	142	Bubble (when mixed with nitrogen gas), or Droplet	Perfluorooctyl bromide	Imagent	Alliance Pharmaceuticals	Ultrasound contrast agent, contrast for MRI and CT, and Oxygen Therapeutic - Oxygen Flow Enhancer	Discontinued clinical development, continuing pre-clinical development
C_{8}BrF_{17}, and C_{10}F_{21}Br	142, 185	Droplet	Perfluorooctyl bromide and perfluorodecylbromide	Oxygent	Alliance Pharmaceuticals	Oxygen Therapeutic - Blood Substitute	Discontinued
C_{10}H_{2}F_{18}	64.3	Droplet	Bis-perfluorobutylethelene	oxygenated fluorocarbon nutrient emulsion (OFNE)	Integra LifeSciences	Oxygen Therapeutic - CSF Substitute	Discontinued
C_{10}F_{18}, and C_{9}F_{21}N	142	Droplet	Perfluorodecalin and Perfluorotripropylamine	Fluosol, Fluosol-DA	Green Cross Corporation	Oxygen Therapeutic - Blood Substitute	Discontinued
C_{10}F_{20}	148.5	Droplet	Perfluorodecene	ABL-101, Oxycyte	Aurum Biosciences, Tenax Therapeutics, Oxygen Biotherapeutics	Oxygen Therapeutic - Blood Substitute	Phase I clinical trial in acute ischemic stroke
C_{22}F_{41}N	172	Droplet	Perftoran	Perftoran, or VIDAPHOR	FluorO2	Oxygen Therapeutic - Blood Substitute	Approved in Russia
