= Disufenton sodium =

Chemical compound

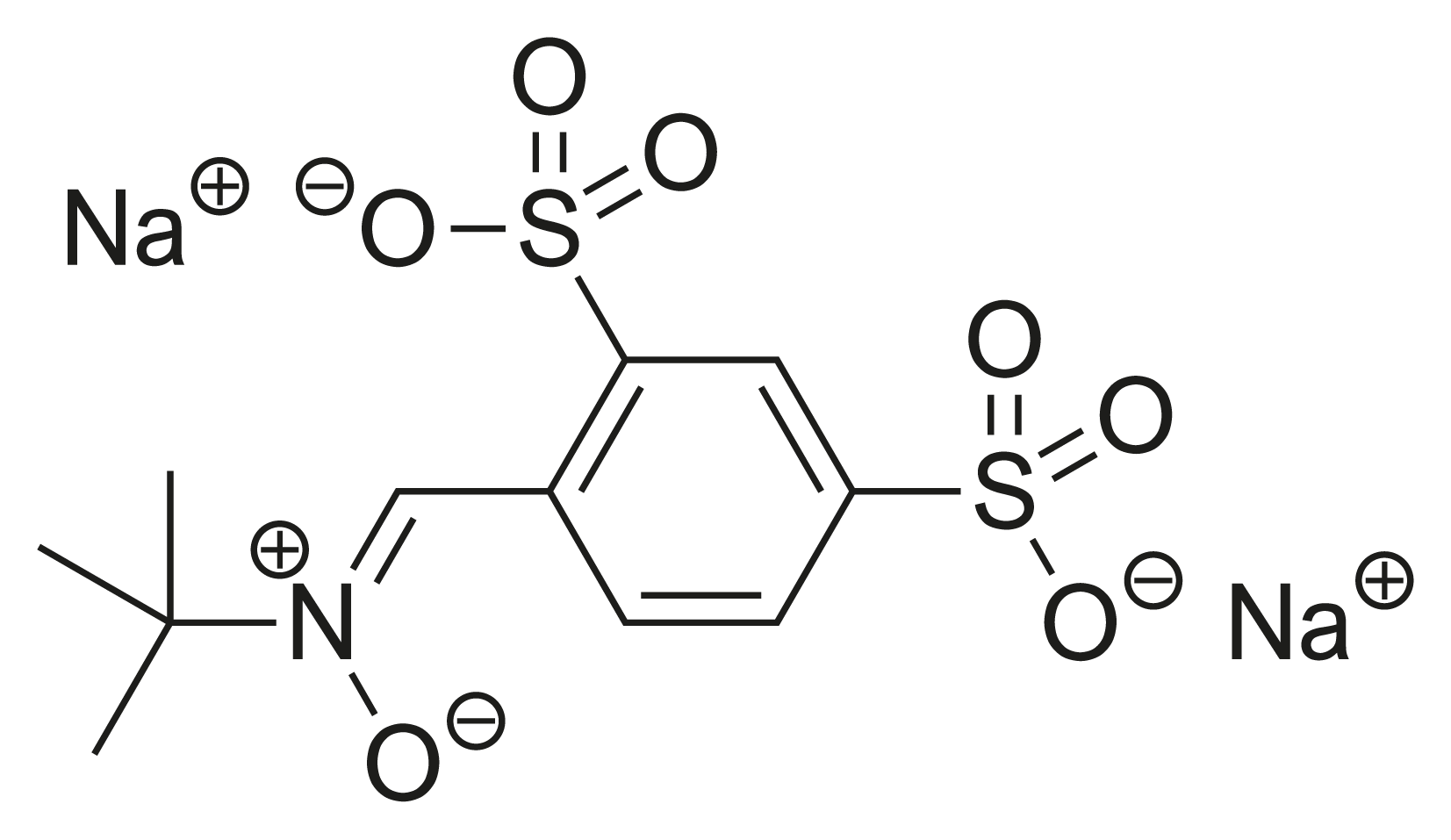

Clinical data
- ATC code: none

Identifiers
- IUPAC name: Disodium 4-[(Z)-(tert-butyl-oxidoazaniumylidene)methyl]benzene-1,3-disulfonate
- CAS Number: 168021-79-2
- PubChem CID: 6440181
- ChemSpider: 28530805
- UNII: 7M1J3HN9VO
- KEGG: D03875
- ChEMBL: ChEMBL1627056

Chemical and physical data
- Formula: C_{11}H_{13}NNa_{2}O_{7}S_{2}
- Molar mass: 381.32 g·mol^{−1}
- 3D model (JSmol): Interactive image
- SMILES: CC(C)(C)[N+]([O-])=Cc1ccc(cc1S(=O)(=O)[O-])S(=O)(=O)[O-].[Na+].[Na+]
- InChI: InChI=1S/C11H15NO7S2.2Na/c1-11(2,3)12(13)7-8-4-5-9(20(14,15)16)6-10(8)21(17,18)19;;/h4-7H,1-3H3,(H,14,15,16)(H,17,18,19);;/q;2*+1/p-2; Key:XLZOVRYBVCMCGL-UHFFFAOYSA-L

Disufenton sodium (Cerovive, OKN-007, NXY-059, HPN-07) is a free radical trapping nitrone-based antioxidant compound that has been under development for several medical conditions.

== Chemistry ==
Disufenton sodium is the disulfonyl derivative of the neuroprotective nitrone spin trap phenylbutylnitrone or "PBN". PBN and its derivatives hydrolyze and oxidize in vitro to form respectively MNP-OH (AKA, NtBHA) and its parent spin-trap MNP.

== Research ==
Disufenton sodium was under development at the drug company AstraZeneca. A 2005 phase-3 clinical trial called "SAINT-1" reported some efficacy in the acute treatment of ischemia injury due to stroke. However, a 2006 attempt to repeat this trial indicated no significant activity. After ruling out other causes, the authors tentatively attributed the positive results in the first trial to "chance". AstraZeneca then terminated the development programme.

Disufenton sodium has been researched as a potential treatment for use in brain tumors and cancers, including diffuse intrinsic pontine glioma (DIPG) and glioblastoma.

A compound (NHPN-1010) containing a combination of disufenton sodium and acetylcysteine has been researched as a potential treatment for tinnitus and hearing loss.
