= Dielectric gas =

Gas separating electrical conductors from each other

A dielectric gas, or insulating gas, is a dielectric material in gaseous state. Its main purpose is to prevent or rapidly quench electric discharges. Dielectric gases are used as electrical insulators in high voltage applications, e.g. transformers, circuit breakers (namely sulfur hexafluoride circuit breakers), switchgear (namely high voltage switchgear), radar waveguides, etc.

For high voltage applications, a good dielectric gas should have high dielectric strength, high thermal stability and chemical inertness against the construction materials used, non-flammability and low toxicity, low boiling point, good heat transfer properties, and low cost.

The most common dielectric gas is air, due to its ubiquity and low cost. Another commonly used gas is a dry nitrogen.

In special cases, e.g., high voltage switches, gases with good dielectric properties and very high breakdown voltages are needed. Highly electronegative elements, e.g., halogens, are favored as they rapidly recombine with the ions present in the discharge channel. The halogen gases are highly corrosive. Other compounds, which dissociate only in the discharge pathway, are therefore preferred; sulfur hexafluoride, organofluorides (especially perfluorocarbons) and chlorofluorocarbons are the most common.

The breakdown voltage of gases is roughly proportional to their density. Breakdown voltages also increase with the gas pressure. Many gases have limited upper pressure due to their liquefaction.

The decomposition products of halogenated compounds are highly corrosive, hence the occurrence of corona discharge should be prevented.

Build-up of moisture can degrade dielectric properties of the gas. Moisture analysis is used for early detection of this.

Dielectric gases can also serve as coolants.

Vacuum is an alternative for gas in some applications.

Mixtures of gases can be used where appropriate. Addition of sulfur hexafluoride can dramatically improve the dielectric properties of poorer insulators, e.g. helium or nitrogen. Multicomponent gas mixtures can offer superior dielectric properties; the optimum mixtures combine the electron attaching gases (sulfur hexafluoride, octafluorocyclobutane) with molecules capable of thermalizing (slowing) accelerated electrons (e.g. tetrafluoromethane, fluoroform). The insulator properties of the gas are controlled by the combination of electron attachment, electron scattering, and electron ionization.

Atmospheric pressure significantly influences the insulation properties of air. High-voltage applications, e.g. xenon flash lamps, can experience electrical breakdowns at high altitudes.

Relative spark breakdown voltages of insulating gases at 1 atm
Gas	Formula	Breakdown voltage relative to air	Molecular weight (g/mol)	Density^{*} (g/L)	ODP	GWP	Electron-attaching	Properties
Sulfur hexafluoride	SF_{6}	3.0	146.06	6.164		22800		The most popular insulating gas. It is dense and rich in fluorine, which is a good discharge quencher. Good cooling properties. Excellent arc quenching. Corrosive decomposition products. Although most of the decomposition products tend to quickly re-form SF_{6}, arcing or corona can produce disulfur decafluoride (S_{2}F_{10}), a highly toxic gas, with toxicity similar to phosgene. Sulfur hexafluoride in an electric arc may also react with other materials and produce toxic compounds, e.g. beryllium fluoride from beryllium oxide ceramics. Frequently used in mixtures with e.g. nitrogen or air.
Nitrogen	N_{2}	1.15	28	1.251	–	–	not	Often used at high pressure. Does not facilitate combustion. Can be used with 10–20% of SF_{6} as a lower-cost alternative to SF_{6}. Can be used standalone or in combination with CO_{2}. Non-electron attaching, efficient in slowing electrons.
Air	29/mixture	1		1.2	–	–		Breakdown voltage 30 kV/cm at 1 atm. Very well-researched. When subjected to an electrical discharge, forms corrosive nitrogen oxides and other compounds, especially in presence of water. Corrosive decomposition products. Can facilitate combustion, especially when compressed.
Ammonia	NH_{3}	1	17.031	0.86				
Carbon dioxide	CO_{2}	0.95	44.01	1.977	–	1	weak	
Carbon monoxide	CO	1.2					weak	Effective in slowing electrons. Toxic.
Hydrogen sulfide	H_{2}S	0.9	34.082	1.363				
Oxygen	O_{2}	0.85	32.0	1.429	–	–		Very effectively facilitates combustion. Dangerous especially when high-concentration or compressed.
Chlorine	Cl_{2}	0.85	70.9	3.2				
Hydrogen	H_{2}	0.65	2.016	0.09			virtually not	Low breakdown voltage but high thermal capacity and very low viscosity. Used for cooling of e.g. hydrogen-cooled turbogenerators. Handling and safety problems. Very fast deexcitation, can be used in high repetition rate spark gaps and fast thyratrons.
Sulfur dioxide	SO_{2}	0.30	64.07	2.551				
Nitrous oxide	N_{2}O	~1.3					weak	Weakly electron-attaching. Efficient in slowing electrons.
1,2-Dichlorotetrafluoroethane (R-114)	CF_{2}ClCF_{2}Cl	3.2	170.92	1.455	?		strong	Saturated pressure at 23 °C is about 2 atm, yielding breakdown voltage 5.6 times higher than nitrogen at 1 atm. Corrosive decomposition products.
Dichlorodifluoromethane (R-12)	CF_{2}Cl_{2}	2.9	120.91	6	1	8100	strong	Vapor pressure 90 psi (6.1 atm) at 23 °C, yielding breakdown voltage 17 times higher than air at 1 atm. Higher breakdown voltages can be achieved by increasing pressure by adding nitrogen. Corrosive decomposition products.
Trifluoromethane	CF_{3}H	0.8					weak	
1,1,1,3,3,3-Hexafluoropropane (R-236fa)	CF_{3}CH_{2}CF_{3}		152.05			6300	strong	Corrosive decomposition products.
Carbon tetrafluoride (R-14)	CF_{4}	1.01	88.0	3.72	–	6500		Poor insulator when used alone. In mixture with SF_{6} somewhat decreases sulfur hexafluoride's dielectric properties, but significantly lowers the mixture's boiling point and prevents condensation at extremely low temperatures. Lowers the cost, toxicity and corrosiveness of pure SF_{6}.
Hexafluoroethane (R-116)	C_{2}F_{6}	2.02	138	5.734	–	9200	strong	
1,1,1,2-Tetrafluoroethane (R-134a)	C_{2}H_{2}F_{4}						strong	Possible alternative of SF_{6}. Its arc-quenching properties are poor, but its dielectric properties are fairly good.
Perfluoropropane (R-218)	C_{3}F_{8}	2.2	188	8.17	–	?	strong	
Octafluorocyclobutane (R-C318)	C_{4}F_{8}	3.6	200	7.33	–	?	strong	Possible alternative of SF_{6}.
Perfluorobutane (R-3-1-10)	C_{4}F_{10}	2.6	238	11.21	–	?	strong	
30% SF_{6}/70% air		2.0						
Helium	He						Not	Non-electron attaching, not efficient in slowing electrons.
Neon	Ne	0.02					Not	Non-electron attaching, not efficient in slowing electrons.
Argon	Ar	0.2					Not	Non-electron attaching, not efficient in slowing electrons.
vacuum								High vacuum is used in capacitors and switches. Problems with vacuum maintenance. Higher voltages may lead to production of x-rays.

^{*} The density is approximate; it is normally specified at atmospheric pressure, the temperature may vary, though it is mostly 0 °C.
