= Hexafluoroethane =

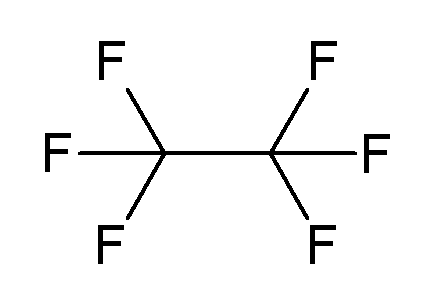

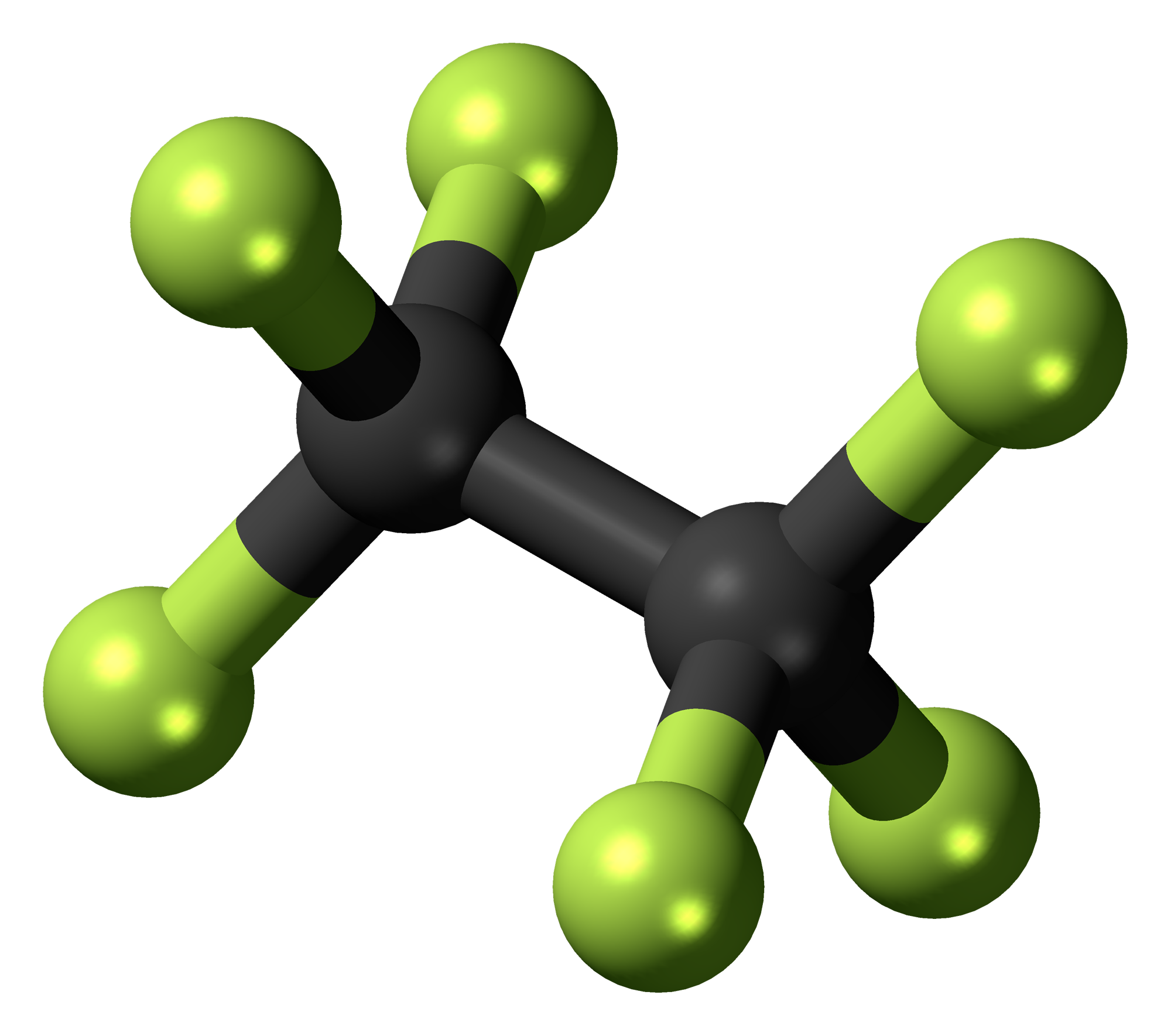

Names
- Preferred IUPAC name Hexafluoroethane
- Other names: Carbon hexafluoride; 1,1,1,2,2,2-Hexafluoroethane; Perfluoroethane; Ethforane; Halocarbon 116; PFC-116; CFC-116; R-116; Arcton 116; Halon 2600; UN 2193

Identifiers
| CAS Number | 76-16-4 |
| 3D model (JSmol) | Interactive image |
| ChEBI | CHEBI:32905 |
| ChEMBL | ChEMBL116574 |
| ChemSpider | 6191 |
| ECHA InfoCard | 100.000.855 |
| EC Number | 200-939-8 |
| PubChem CID | 6431 |
| RTECS number | KI4110000 |
| UNII | 7VL5Z0IY3A |
| UN number | 2193 |
| CompTox Dashboard (EPA) | DTXSID2041915 |
- InChI: InChI=1S/C2F6/c3-1(4,5)2(6,7)8 Key: WMIYKQLTONQJES-UHFFFAOYSA-N; InChI=1/C2F6/c3-1(4,5)2(6,7)8 Key: WMIYKQLTONQJES-UHFFFAOYAP
- SMILES: FC(F)(F)C(F)(F)F

Properties
| Chemical formula | C_{2}F_{6} |
| Molar mass | 138.012 g·mol^{−1} |
| Appearance | Colorless odorless gas |
| Density | 5.734 kg/m^{3} at 24 °C |
| Melting point | −100.6 °C (−149.1 °F; 172.6 K) |
| Boiling point | −78.2 °C (−108.8 °F; 195.0 K) |
| Solubility in water | 0.0015% |
| log P | 2 |
| Henry's law constant (k_{H}) | 0.000058 mol/(kg·bar) |

Hazards
| NFPA 704 (fire diamond) | 1 0 0 |
| Flash point | Non-flammable |

Related compounds
| Related compounds | Carbon tetrafluoride; Octafluoropropane; Perfluorobutane; Perfluoropentane; Perfluorohexane; Perfluoroheptane; Perfluorooctane; Ethane; Difluoroacetylene; Tetrafluoroethylene; Tetrachloro-1,1-difluoroethane; Tetrachloro-1,2-difluoroethane; Tetrachloro-1,1-difluoroethane; 1,1,2-Trichloro-1,2,2-trifluoroethane; 1,1,1-Trichloro-2,2,2-trifluoroethane; Pentachlorofluoroethane; Hexachloroethane; Hexabromoethane; Hexaiodoethane |

Supplementary data page
- Hexafluoroethane (data page)
- Except where otherwise noted, data are given for materials in their standard state (at 25 °C [77 °F], 100 kPa). verify (what is ?) Infobox references

Hexafluoroethane is an organofluorine compound with the chemical formula C_{2}F_{6}. It is a non-flammable colorless odorless gas negligibly soluble in water and slightly soluble in methanol. Its structure is F_{3}C−CF_{3}. It is an extremely potent and long-lived greenhouse gas. It is the perfluorocarbon counterpart to the hydrocarbon ethane.

== Physical properties ==
Hexafluoroethane's solid phase has two polymorphs. In the scientific literature, different phase transition temperatures have been stated. The latest works assign it at 103 K (−170 °C). Below 103 K it has a slightly disordered structure, and over the transition point, it has a body centered cubic structure. The critical point is at 19.89 °C (293.04 K) and 30.39 bar.

Table of densities:

| State, temperature | Density (kg/m^{3}) |
|---|---|
| liquid, −78.2 °C | 16.08 |
| gas, −78.2 °C | 8.86 |
| gas, 15 °C | 5.84 |
| gas, 20.1 °C | 5.716 |
| gas, 24 °C | 5.734 |

Vapor density is 4.823 (air = 1), specific gravity at 21 °C is 4.773 (air = 1) and specific volume at 21 °C is 0.1748 m^{3}/kg.

== Uses ==
Hexafluoroethane is used as a versatile etchant in semiconductor manufacturing. It can be used for selective etching of metal silicides and oxides versus their metal substrates and also for etching of silicon dioxide over silicon. The primary aluminium and the semiconductor manufacturing industries are the major emitters of hexafluoroethane using the Hall-Héroult process.

Together with trifluoromethane it is used in refrigerants R508A (61%) and R508B (54%).

It is used as a tamponade to assist in retinal reattachment following vitreoretinal surgery.

== Environmental effects ==
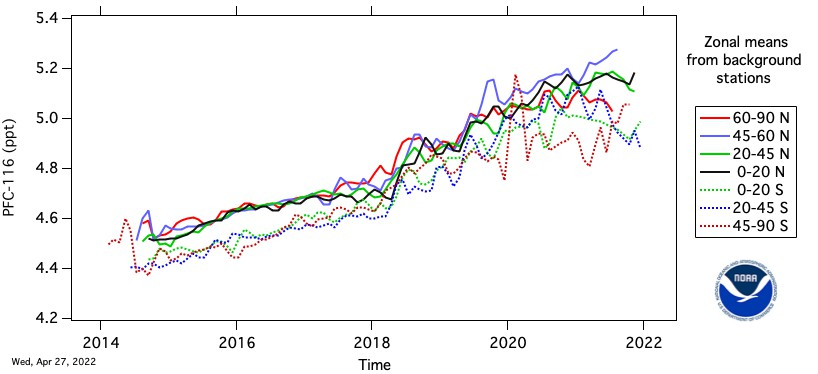
Hexafluoroethane timeseries at various latitudes.

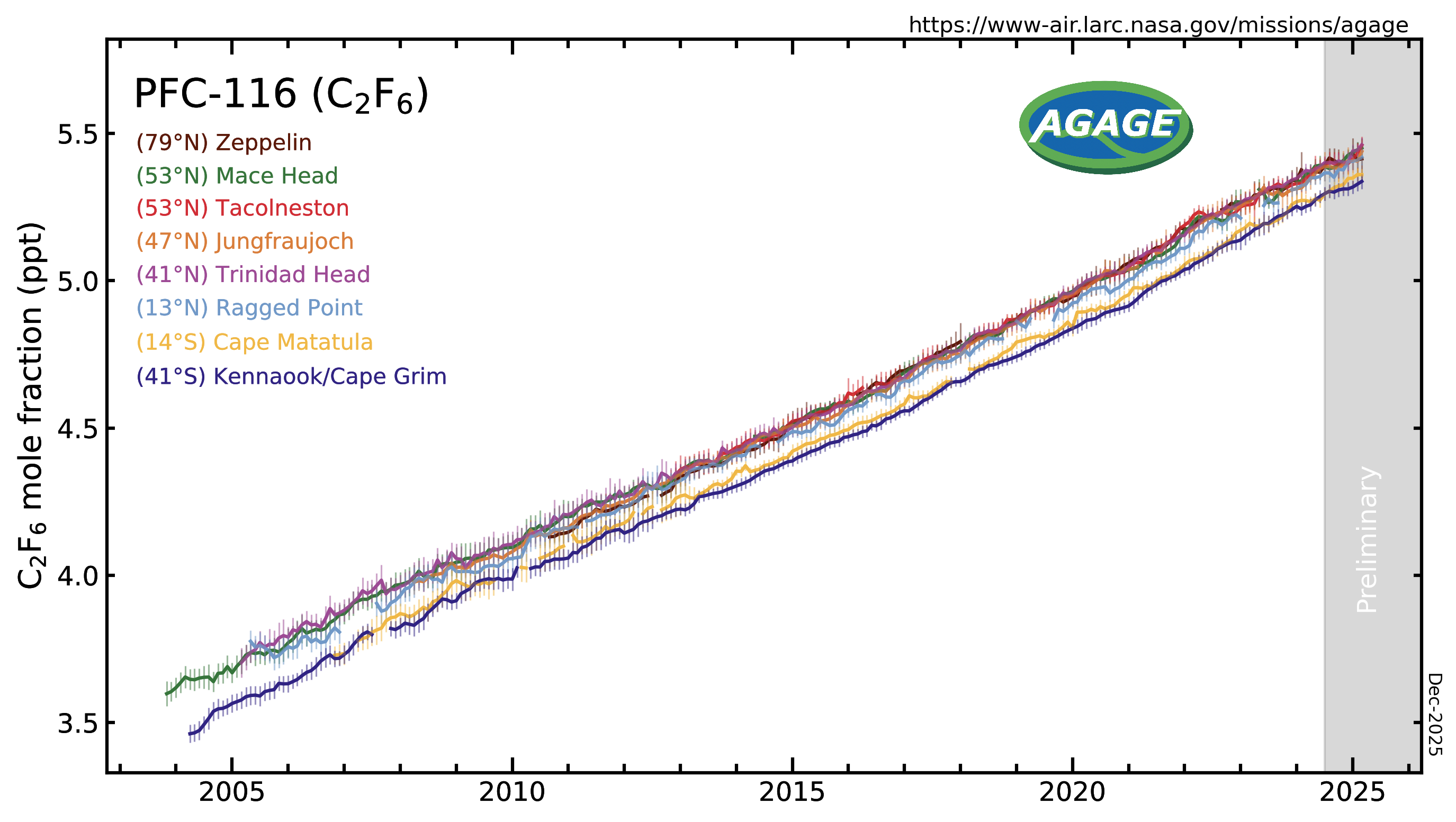
PFC-116 measured by the Advanced Global Atmospheric Gases Experiment (AGAGE) in the lower atmosphere (troposphere) at stations around the world. Abundances are given as pollution free monthly mean mole fractions in parts-per-trillion.

Due to the high energy of C−F bonds, hexafluoroethane is nearly inert and thus acts as an extremely stable greenhouse gas, with an atmospheric lifetime of 10,000 years (other sources: 500 years). It has a global warming potential (GWP) of 9200 and an ozone depletion potential (ODP) of 0. Hexafluoroethane is included in the IPCC list of greenhouse gases.

Hexafluoroethane did not exist in significant amounts in the environment prior to industrial-scale manufacturing. Its absorption bands in the infrared part of the spectrum cause a radiative forcing of about 0.001 W/m^{2}.

== Health risks ==
Due to its high relative density, it gathers in low-lying areas, and at high concentrations it can cause asphyxiation.

== See also ==
- Carbon tetrafluoride
- Octafluoropropane
- Tetrafluoroethene
- Hexachloroethane
