= Perfluorobutane =

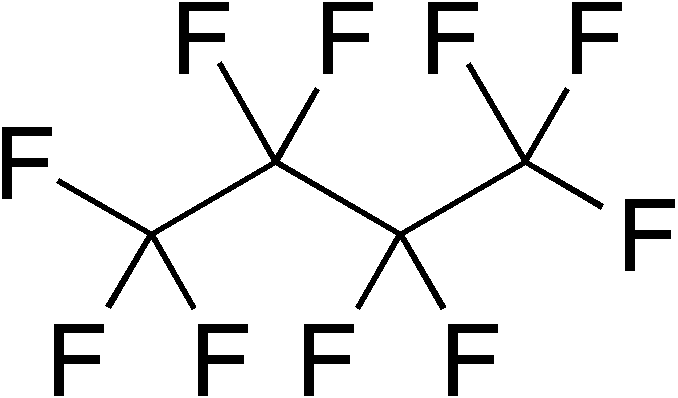

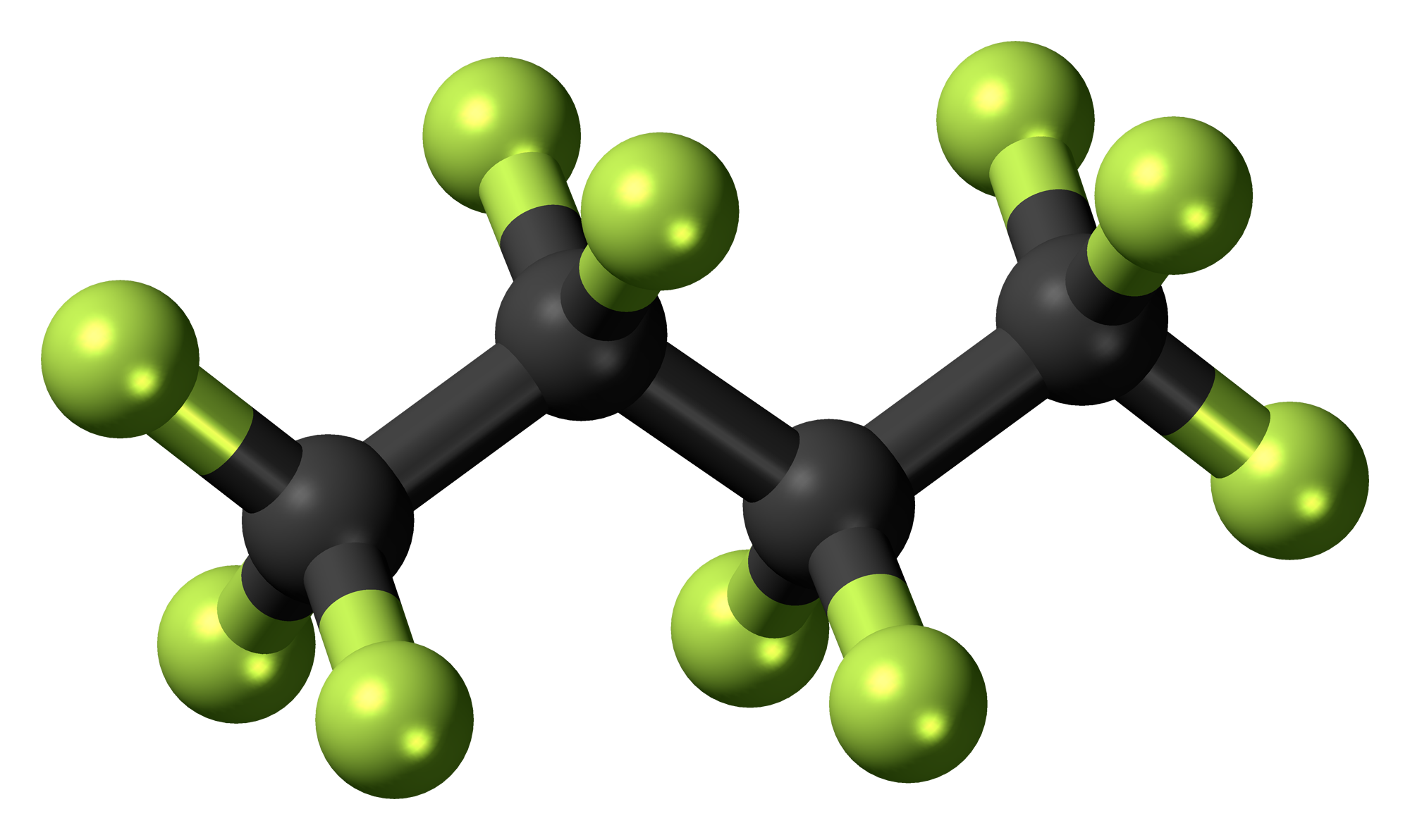

Names
- Preferred IUPAC name Decafluorobutane
- Other names: Perflubutane (USAN); DFB; Halocarbon 610; R610

Identifiers
CAS Number	355-25-9
3D model (JSmol)	Interactive image
ChEBI	CHEBI:134964
ChemSpider	13862701
ECHA InfoCard	100.005.983
EC Number	206-580-3
KEGG	D05440
PubChem CID	9638
UNII	SE4TWR0K2C
CompTox Dashboard (EPA)	DTXSID5059876
- InChI: InChI=1S/C4F10/c5-1(6,3(9,10)11)2(7,8)4(12,13)14 Key: KAVGMUDTWQVPDF-UHFFFAOYSA-N; InChI=1/C4F10/c5-1(6,3(9,10)11)2(7,8)4(12,13)14 Key: KAVGMUDTWQVPDF-UHFFFAOYAC
- SMILES: C(C(C(F)(F)F)(F)F)(C(F)(F)F)(F)F

Properties
Chemical formula	C_{4}F_{10}
Molar mass	238.028 g·mol^{−1}
Appearance	Colorless gas
Density	11.21 g/L (gas); 1.594 g/cm^{3} (liquid)
Melting point	−128 °C (−198 °F; 145 K)
Boiling point	−1.7 °C (28.9 °F; 271.4 K)
Solubility in water	1.5 mg/L
log P	3.93
Vapor pressure	330.3 kPa (47.91 psi)
Viscosity	0.01218 cP

Hazards
Safety data sheet (SDS)	MSDS at Linde Gas

Related compounds
Related compounds	Tetrafluoromethane; Perfluoroethane; Perfluoropropane; Perfluoropentane; Perfluorohexane; Perfluoroheptane; Perfluorooctane
- Except where otherwise noted, data are given for materials in their standard state (at 25 °C [77 °F], 100 kPa). verify (what is ?) Infobox references

Perfluorobutane (PFB) is an inert, high-density colorless gas. It is a simple fluorocarbon with a n-butane skeleton and all the hydrogen atoms replaced with fluorine atoms.

== Uses ==
Perfluorobutane can replace Halon 1301 in fire extinguishers, as well as the gas component for newer generation microbubble ultrasound contrast agents. Sonazoid is one such microbubble formulation developed by Amersham Health that uses perfluorobutane for the gas core.

== Environmental impacts ==
If perfluorobutane is released to the environment, it will not be broken down in air. It is not expected to be broken down by sunlight. It will move into air from soil and water surfaces. If it is exposed to conditions of extreme heat from misuse, equipment failure, etc., toxic decomposition products including hydrogen fluoride can be produced.

Perfluorobutane has an estimated lifetime greater than 2600 years and a high global warming potential value of 10,000 over 100 years.
