= Perfluoromethyldecalin =

Perfluoro-1-methyldecalin
Perfluoro-2-methyldecalin

Names
- IUPAC names: 1-methyl: 1,1,2,2,3,3,4,4,4a,5,5,6,6,7,7,8,8a-heptadecafluorodecahydro-8-(trifluoromethyl)naphthalene; 2-methyl: 1,1,2,2,3,3,4,4,4a,5,5,6,6,7,8,8,8a-heptadecafluorodecahydro-7-(trifluoromethyl)naphthalene
- Other names Flutec PP9

Identifiers
- Compounds; Mixture; 1-methyl: Perfluoro-1-methyldecalin; 2-methyl: Perfluoro-2-methyldecalin
CAS Number	Mixture: 51294-16-7; 1-methyl: 306-92-3; 2-methyl: 306-95-6
3D model (JSmol)	1-methyl: Interactive image; 2-methyl: Interactive image
ChemSpider	Mixture: 17340230
ECHA InfoCard	100.005.630
EC Number	Mixture: 206-191-9
PubChem CID	Mixture: 39977
UNII	Mixture: VWJ68OB6TM
CompTox Dashboard (EPA)	Mixture: DTXSID30897561
- InChI: 1-methyl: InChI=1S/C11F20/c12-1-2(13,6(19,20)10(27,28)9(25,26)4(1,15)16)5(17,18)8(23,24)7(21,22)3(1,14)11(29,30)31 Key: LWRNQOBXRHWPGE-UHFFFAOYSA-N; 2-methyl: InChI=1S/C12F22/c13-1-2(14,11(29,30)31)4(16,12(32,33)34)8(23,24)6(19,20)3(1,15)7(21,22)10(27,28)9(25,26)5(1,17)18 Key: UYXKOSTWUQXOMT-UHFFFAOYSA-N
- SMILES: 1-methyl: FC1(C(F)(C2(C(F)(C(F)(C(F)(C(F)(C2(C(F)(C1(F)F)F)F)F)F)F)F)F)C(F)(F)F)F; 2-methyl: FC(F)(F)C1(F)C(F)(F)C2(F)C(F)(F)C(F)(F)C(F)(F)C(F)(F)C2(F)C(F)(F)C1(F)F

Properties
Chemical formula	C_{11}F_{20}
Molar mass	512.089 g·mol^{−1}
Appearance	Clear, colorless liquid
Density	1.972 g/mL
Melting point	−70 °C (−94 °F; 203 K)
Boiling point	160 °C (320 °F; 433 K)
Solubility in water	10 ppm

Hazards
- Occupational safety and health (OHS/OSH)
Main hazards	None
Flash point	None
Autoignition temperature	None
- Except where otherwise noted, data are given for materials in their standard state (at 25 °C [77 °F], 100 kPa). Infobox references

Perfluoromethyldecalin is a fluorocarbon liquid—a perfluorinated derivative of the hydrocarbon methyldecalin. It is chemically and biologically inert. It is mainly of interest as a blood substitute, exploiting the high solubility of air in this solvent.

== Structural isomers ==
Commercially available perfluoromethyldecalin can consist of mixtures of both perfluoro-1-methyldecalin and perfluoro-2-methyldecalin or each isomer individually. Each structural isomer has its own CAS registry number, as does the mixture.

== Manufacture ==
Perfluoromethyldecalin can be manufactured by the Fowler process, which involves moderating the action of elemental fluorine with cobalt fluoride in the gas phase from methylnaphthalene. Methylnaphthalene is preferred as the starting material vs methyldecalin as is consumes less fluorine.

== Properties ==
Perfluoromethyldecalin is chemically inert and thermally stable (to over 400 °C). It has been evaluated as a blood substitute.

It is a colorless liquid, with a relatively high density, low viscosity, and low surface tension that evaporates rapidly for a compounds with its high molecular weight. It is a relatively good solvent for gases, but a poor solvent for solids and liquids.

In common with other cyclic perfluorocarbons, perfluorodecalin can be detected at extremely low concentrations; it has therefore been proposed for use as a perfluorocarbon tracer. Its higher boiling makes it suitable for use in water flow.

Other applications include use as a heat transfer agent and a dielectric fluid.
