= Perfluorotoluene =

- Perfluorotoluene

Names
- Preferred IUPAC name Pentafluoro(trifluoromethyl)benzene
- Other names Octafluorotoluene, Benzene, pentafluoro(trifluoromethyl)-, Pentafluorobenzotrifluoride

Identifiers
CAS Number	434-64-0
3D model (JSmol)	Interactive image
ChEMBL	ChEMBL455799
ChemSpider	9522
ECHA InfoCard	100.006.460
EC Number	207-104-7
PubChem CID	9906
UNII	4EFB94M9FV
CompTox Dashboard (EPA)	DTXSID1059993
- InChI: InChI=1S/C7F8/c8-2-1(7(13,14)15)3(9)5(11)6(12)4(2)10 Key: USPWUOFNOTUBAD-UHFFFAOYSA-N
- SMILES: FC1=C(F)C(F)=C(C(F)=C1F)C(F)(F)F

Properties
Chemical formula	C_{7}F_{8}
Molar mass	236.064 g·mol^{−1}
Appearance	Clear light yellow liquid
Density	1.666 g/cm^{3}
Melting point	−65.6 °C (−86.1 °F; 207.6 K)
Boiling point	104 °C (219 °F; 377 K)
Solubility	Miscible with Organic compounds
Vapor pressure	26 mmHg

Hazards
- Occupational safety and health (OHS/OSH)
Main hazards	Irritant, Highly Flammable
- GHS labelling
Pictograms	(GHS07: Exclamation mark) (GHS06: Toxic) (GHS02: Flammable)
Signal word	Warning
NFPA 704 (fire diamond)	1 3 0
Flash point	20 °C (68 °F; 293 K)
Safety data sheet (SDS)	MSDS

Related compounds
Related compounds	Fluorocarbon
- Except where otherwise noted, data are given for materials in their standard state (at 25 °C [77 °F], 100 kPa). verify (what is ?) Infobox references

Perfluorotoluene or octafluorotoluene is a chemical which belongs to the class of fluorocarbons, specifically a perfluorocarbon. Fluorocarbons and their derivatives are useful fluoropolymers, refrigerants, solvents, and anesthetics.

More specifically, perfluorotoluene is a perfluoroaromatic compound, which is perfluorocarbon containing an aromatic ring. Other examples include hexafluorobenzene and octafluoronaphthalene. Perfluorotoluene is commonly used as industrial solvent and can be prepared by defluorination of perfluoromethylcyclohexane by heating to 500 °C with a nickel or iron catalyst.
