= Perfluoro-1,3-dimethylcyclohexane =

Names
- IUPAC name 1,1,2,2,3,3,4,5,5,6-Decafluoro-4,6-bis(trifluoromethyl)cyclohexane
- Other names Flutec PP3

Identifiers
CAS Number	335-27-3
3D model (JSmol)	Interactive image
ChemSpider	10628076
ECHA InfoCard	100.005.807
EC Number	206-386-9
PubChem CID	78975
UNII	Q1Y54IOL0P
CompTox Dashboard (EPA)	DTXSID0036926
- InChI: Key: LOQGSOTUHASIHI-UHFFFAOYSA-N
- SMILES: FC(F)(F)C1(F)C(F)(F)C(F)(F)C(F)(F)C(F)(C(F)(F)F)C1(F)F

Properties
Chemical formula	C_{8}F_{16}
Molar mass	400.062 g·mol^{−1}
Appearance	Clear, colorless liquid
Density	1.828 g/mL
Melting point	−70 °C (−94 °F; 203 K)
Boiling point	102 °C (216 °F; 375 K)
Solubility in water	10 ppm

Hazards
- Occupational safety and health (OHS/OSH)
Main hazards	None
Flash point	None
- Except where otherwise noted, data are given for materials in their standard state (at 25 °C [77 °F], 100 kPa). Infobox references

Perfluoro-1,3-dimethylcyclohexane is a fluorocarbon liquid—a perfluorinated derivative of the hydrocarbon 1,3-dimethylcyclohexane. It is chemically and biologically inert.

== Manufacture ==
Perfluoro-1,3-dimethylcyclohexane can be manufactured by the Fowler process, which involves moderating the action of elemental fluorine with cobalt fluoride in the gas phase from meta-xylene. This is preferred as the starting material over 1,3-dimethylcyclohexane as less fluorine is required.

== Properties ==
Perfluoro-1,3-dimethylcyclohexane is chemically inert and thermally stable (to over 400 °C).

It is a clear, colorless liquid, with a relatively high density, low viscosity and low surface tension that will rapidly evaporate. It is a relatively good solvent for gases, but a poor solvent for solids and liquids.

In common with other cyclic perfluorocarbons, perfluoro-1,3-dimethylcyclohexane can be detected at extremely low concentrations, making it ideal as a tracer.

== Applications ==
- Heat transfer agent
- Dielectric fluid
- Perfluorocarbon tracer
