= Perfluoromethylcyclohexane =

Names
- Preferred IUPAC name Undecafluoro(trifluoromethyl)cyclohexane
- Other names Flutec PP2

Identifiers
CAS Number	355-02-2
3D model (JSmol)	Interactive image
ChemSpider	9260
ECHA InfoCard	100.005.976
EC Number	206-386-9
PubChem CID	9637
UNII	VJ9772YW63
CompTox Dashboard (EPA)	DTXSID5059874
- InChI: InChI=1S/C7F14/c8-1(7(19,20)21)2(9,10)4(13,14)6(17,18)5(15,16)3(1,11)12 Key: QIROQPWSJUXOJC-UHFFFAOYSA-N
- SMILES: FC(F)(F)C1(F)C(F)(F)C(F)(F)C(F)(F)C(F)(F)C1(F)F

Properties
Chemical formula	C_{7}F_{14}
Molar mass	350.055 g·mol^{−1}
Appearance	Clear, colorless liquid
Density	1.788 g/mL
Melting point	−37 °C (−35 °F; 236 K)
Boiling point	76 °C (169 °F; 349 K)
Solubility in water	10 ppm

Hazards
- Occupational safety and health (OHS/OSH)
Main hazards	None
Flash point	None
Autoignition temperature	None
- Except where otherwise noted, data are given for materials in their standard state (at 25 °C [77 °F], 100 kPa). Infobox references

Perfluoromethylcyclohexane is a fluorocarbon liquid—a perfluorinated derivative of the hydrocarbon methylcyclohexane. It is chemically and biologically inert.

== Manufacture ==
Perfluoromethylcyclohexane can be manufactured by the Fowler process, which involves moderating the action of elemental fluorine with cobalt fluoride in the gas phase from toluene. This is preferred as the starting material over methylcyclohexane as less fluorine is required.

== Properties ==
Perfluoromethylcyclohexane is chemically inert and thermally stable (to over 400 °C). It is non-toxic.

It is a clear, colorless liquid, with a relatively high density, low viscosity and low surface tension that will rapidly evaporate. It is a relatively good solvent for gases, but a poor solvent for solids and liquids.

In common with other cyclic perfluorocarbons, perfluoromethylcyclohexane can be detected at extremely low concentrations, making it ideal as a tracer.

== Applications ==
- Heat transfer agent
- Dielectric fluid
- Perfluorocarbon tracer
