= Octafluoropropane =

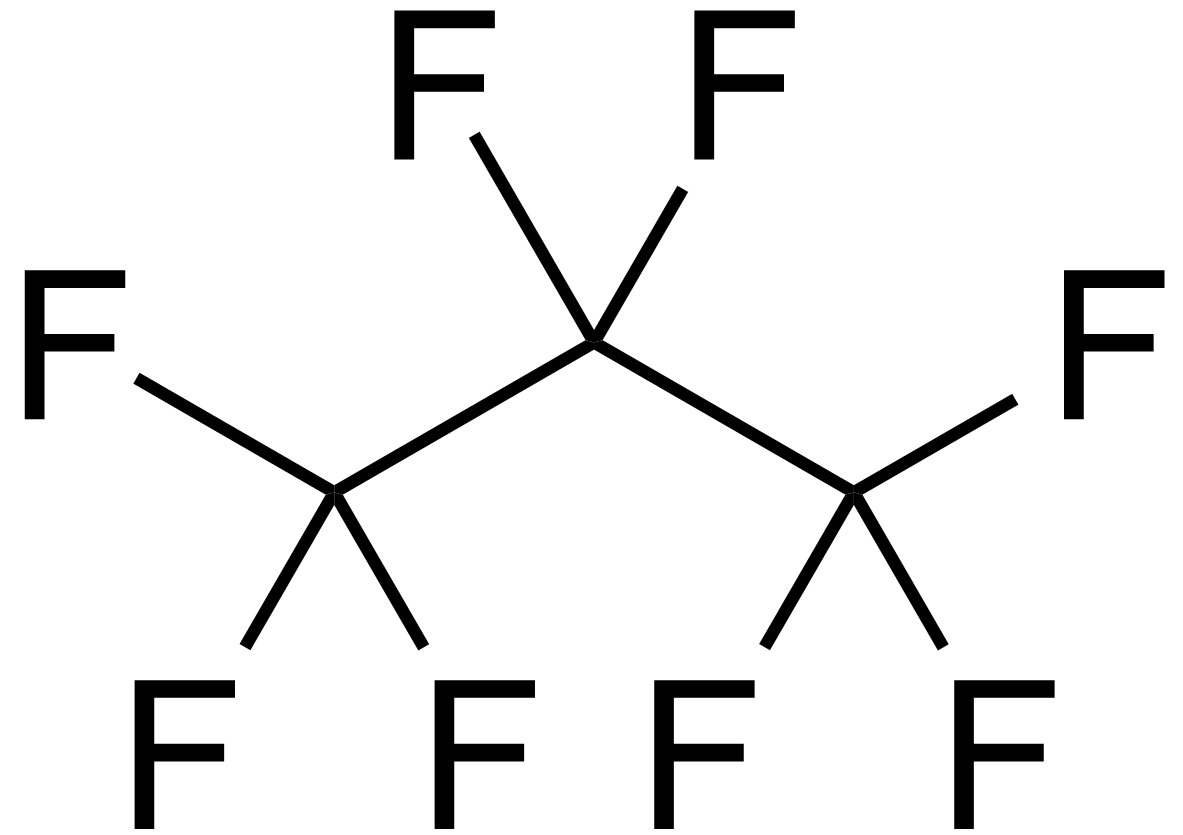

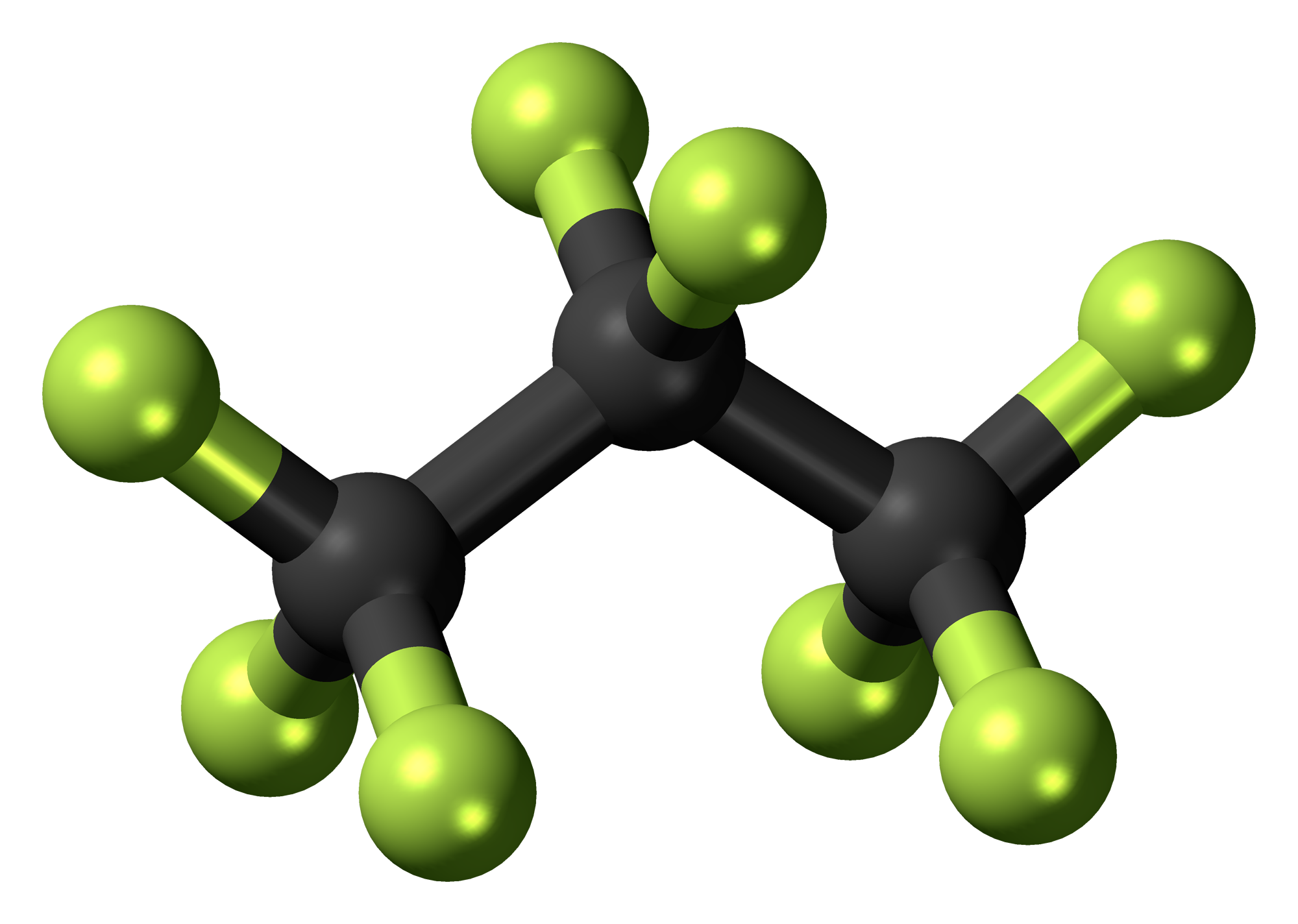

Names
- Preferred IUPAC name Octafluoropropane
- Other names Freon 218; Perfluoropropane; RC 218, PFC 218; R-218; Flutec PP30; Genetron 218

Identifiers
CAS Number	76-19-7
3D model (JSmol)	Interactive image
ChEBI	CHEBI:31980
ChEMBL	ChEMBL1663
ChemSpider	6192
DrugBank	DB00556
ECHA InfoCard	100.000.857
KEGG	D01738
PubChem CID	6432
RTECS number	TZ5255000
UNII	CK0N3WH0SR
CompTox Dashboard (EPA)	DTXSID9052503
- InChI: InChI=1S/C3F8/c4-1(5,2(6,7)8)3(9,10)11 Key: QYSGYZVSCZSLHT-UHFFFAOYSA-N; InChI=1/C3F8/c4-1(5,2(6,7)8)3(9,10)11 Key: QYSGYZVSCZSLHT-UHFFFAOYAL
- SMILES: FC(F)(F)C(F)(F)C(F)(F)F

Properties
Chemical formula	C_{3}F_{8}
Molar mass	188.020 g·mol^{−1}
Appearance	Colorless gas
Density	8.17 g/L
Melting point	−147.6 °C (−233.7 °F; 125.5 K)
Boiling point	−36.7 °C (−34.1 °F; 236.5 K)
Critical point (T, P)	345.05 K (71.90 °C), 26.8 bar
Vapor pressure	792 kPa (21.1 °C)
Thermal conductivity	13.8 mW/(m·K)
Viscosity	0.000125 Poise (0 °C)

Structure
Dipole moment	0.014 D

Thermochemistry
Heat capacity (C)	149 J/(mol·K)

Hazards
- Occupational safety and health (OHS/OSH)
Main hazards	Simple asphyxiant and greenhouse gas
- GHS labelling
Pictograms	(GHS04: Compressed Gas)
Hazard statements	H280
Precautionary statements	P410+P403
NFPA 704 (fire diamond)	1 0 0 SA
Flash point	N/A

Related compounds
Related halocarbons	Tetrafluoromethane; Hexafluoroethane; Perfluorobutane
Related compounds	Propane

Supplementary data page
- Octafluoropropane (data page)
- Except where otherwise noted, data are given for materials in their standard state (at 25 °C [77 °F], 100 kPa). verify (what is ?) Infobox references

Octafluoropropane (C_{3}F_{8}) is the perfluorocarbon counterpart to the hydrocarbon propane. This non-flammable and non-toxic synthetic substance has applications in semiconductor production and medicine. It is also an extremely potent greenhouse gas.

== Manufacture ==
Octafluoropropane can be produced either by electrochemical fluorination or by the Fowler process using cobalt fluoride.

== Applications ==
In the electronics industry, octafluoropropane is mixed with oxygen and used as a plasma etching material for SiO_{2} layers in semiconductor applications, as oxides are selectively etched versus their metal substrates.

In medicine, octafluoropropane may compose the gas cores of microbubble contrast agents used in contrast-enhanced ultrasound. Octafluoropropane microbubbles reflect sound waves well and are used to improve the ultrasound signal backscatter.

It is used in eye surgery, such as pars plana vitrectomy procedures where a retina hole or tear is repaired. The gas provides a long-term tamponade, or plug, of a retinal hole or tear and allows re-attachment of the retina to occur over the several days following the procedure.

Under the name R-218, octafluoropropane is used in other industries as a component of refrigeration mixtures.

It has been featured in some plans for terraforming Mars. With a greenhouse gas effect 24,000 times greater than carbon dioxide (CO_{2}), octafluoropropane could dramatically reduce the time and resources it takes to terraform Mars.

It is the active liquid in the detectors used in the PICO dark matter search experiment, including the under-construction PICO-500 detector.

== Gallery ==
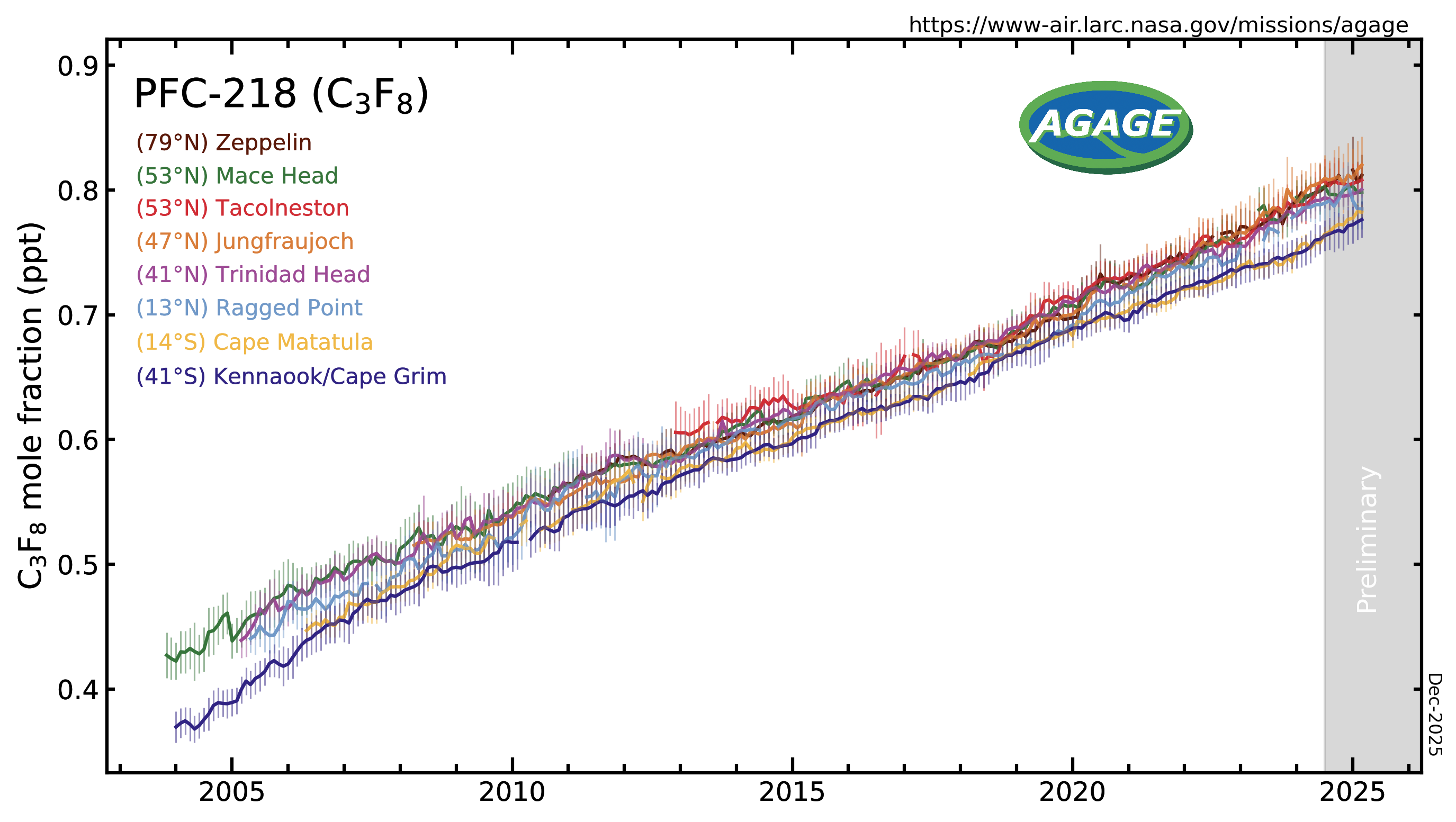
PFC-218 measured by the Advanced Global Atmospheric Gases Experiment (AGAGE) in the lower atmosphere (troposphere) at stations around the world. Abundances are given as pollution free monthly mean mole fractions in parts-per-trillion.
