= Flow tracer =

Any fluid property used to track flow

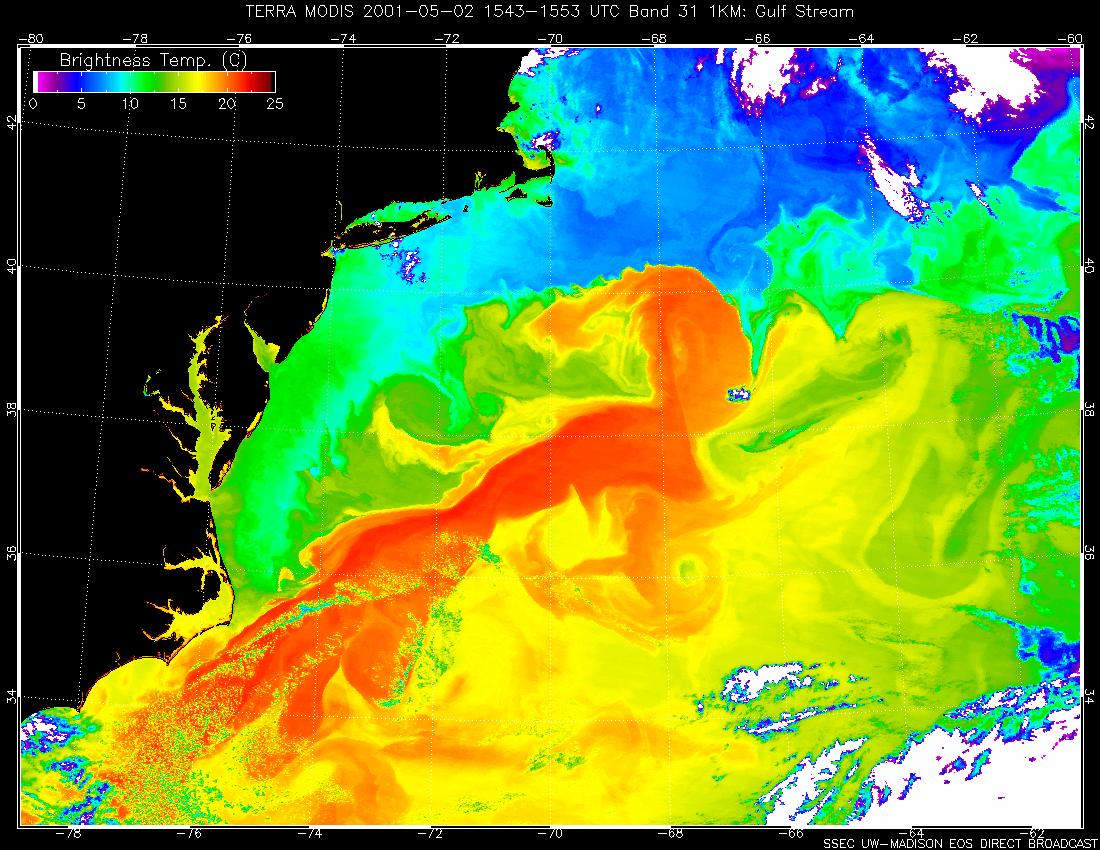
Image of the Gulf Stream obtained by the Moderate-Resolution Imaging Spectroradiometer. The false colors in the image represent "brightness temperature" observed at the top of the atmosphere in the 10.780-11.280 μm band. The brightness temperature values represent heat radiation from a combination of the sea surface and overlying moist atmosphere.

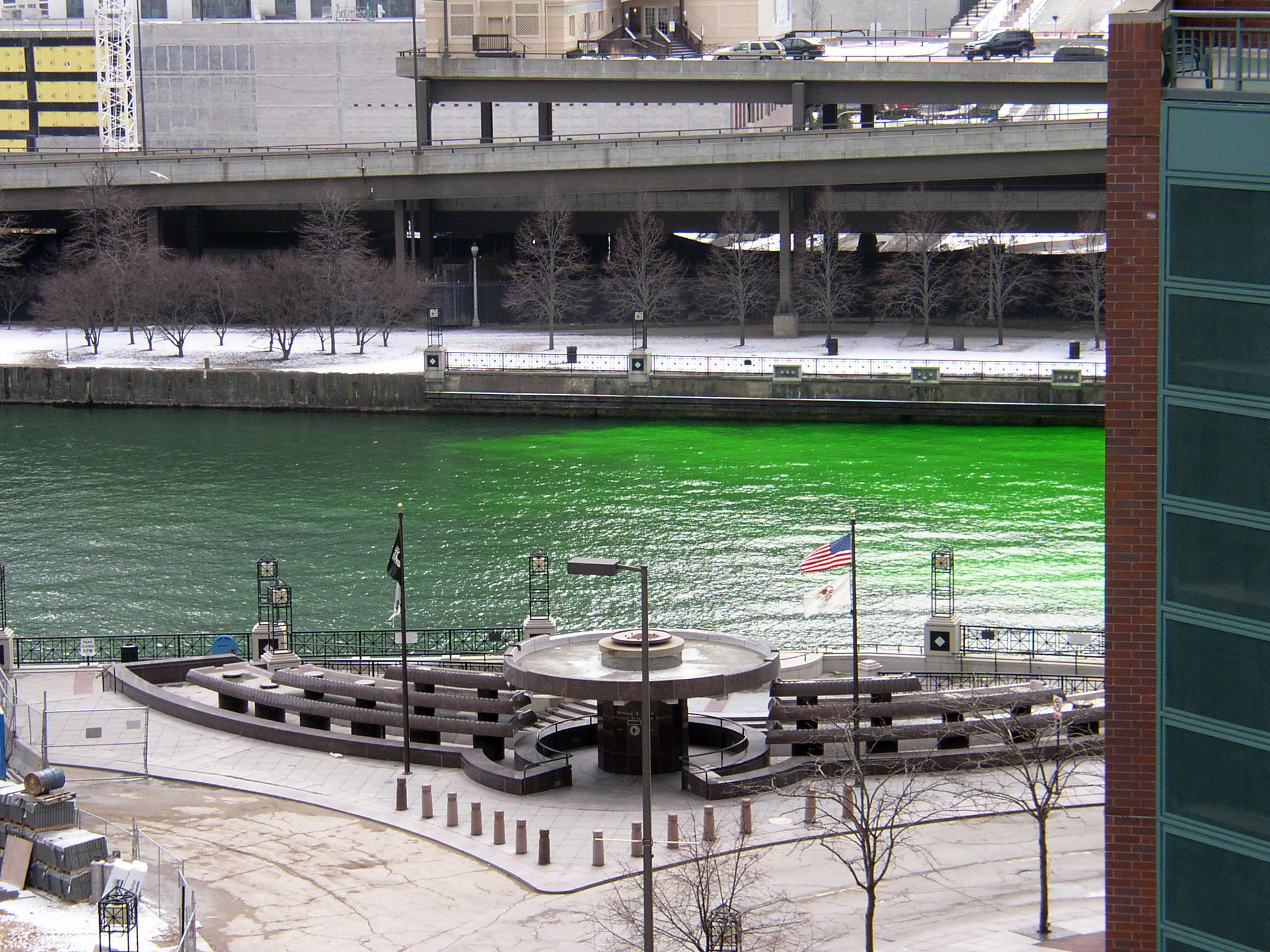
Fluorescein in the Chicago River on the St. Patrick's Day (added for celebration, rather than tracing).

A flow tracer is any fluid property used to track the flow velocity (i.e., flow magnitude and direction) and circulation patterns. Tracers can be chemical properties, such as radioactive material, or chemical compounds, physical properties, such as density, temperature, salinity, or dyes, and can be natural or artificially induced. Flow tracers are used in many fields, such as physics, hydrology, limnology, oceanography, environmental studies and atmospheric studies.

Conservative tracers remain constant following fluid parcels, whereas reactive tracers (such as compounds undergoing a mutual chemical reaction) grow or decay with time. Active tracers dynamically alter the flow of the fluid by changing fluid properties which appear in the equation of motion such as density or viscosity, while passive tracers have no influence on flow.

== Uses in oceanography ==
Ocean tracers are used to deduce small scale flow patterns, large-scale ocean circulation, water mass formation and changes, "dating" of water masses, and carbon dioxide storage and uptake.

Temperature, salinity, density, and other conservative tracers are often used to track currents, circulation and water mass mixing. An interesting example was when 28,000 plastic ducks fell over board from a container ship in the middle of the Pacific Ocean. The following twelve years oceanographers recorded where the ducks washed ashore, some thousands of miles from the spill site, and this data was used to calibrate and verify the circulation patterns of the North Pacific Gyre.

Transient tracers change over time, such as radioactive material (Tritium and Cesium-137) and chemical concentrations (CFCs and SF6), which are used to date water masses and can also track mixing. In the mid-1900s, Nuclear weapons testing and chemical production released tons of compounds that are not naturally found in the environment. While extremely unfortunate, scientists were able to use the concentrations of anthropogenic compounds and half-lives of radioactive material to determine how old a water body is. The Fukushima nuclear disaster was really well studied by oceanographers, who tracked the radioactive material spread throughout the Pacific Ocean, and used that to better understand ocean currents and mixing patterns.

Biological tracers can also be used to track water masses in the ocean. Phytoplankton blooms can be seen by satellites and move with the changing currents. They can be used as a "check point" to see how well water masses are mixing. Subtropical water is often warm, which is ideal for phytoplankton, but nutrient poor, which inhibits their growth, while subpolar water is cold and nutrient rich. When these two types of water masses mix, such as the Kuroshio Current in the north Pacific, it often causes huge phytoplankton blooms, because they now how conditions they need to grow—warm temperatures and high nutrients. Vertical mixing and eddy formation can also cause phytoplankton blooms, and these blooms are tracked by satellites to observe current patterns and mixing.

== See also ==
- Perfluorocarbon tracer
