= Perfluorocyclohexane =

- Perfluorocyclohexane

Names
- Preferred IUPAC name Dodecafluorocyclohexane
- Other names 1,1,2,2,3,3,4,4,5,5,6,6-Dodecafluorocyclohexane, Cyclohexane, dodecafluoro-

Identifiers
CAS Number	355-68-0
3D model (JSmol)	Interactive image
ChemSpider	9263
ECHA InfoCard	100.005.993
EC Number	206-591-3
PubChem CID	9640
CompTox Dashboard (EPA)	DTXSID5075232
- InChI: InChI=1S/C6F12/c7-1(8)2(9,10)4(13,14)6(17,18)5(15,16)3(1,11)12 Key: RKIMETXDACNTIE-UHFFFAOYSA-N
- SMILES: C1(C(C(C(C(C1(F)F)(F)F)(F)F)(F)F)(F)F)(F)F

Properties
Chemical formula	C_{6}F_{12}
Molar mass	300.047 g·mol^{−1}
Appearance	clear, waxy solid
Density	1.684 g/cm^{3}
Melting point	52 °C (126 °F; 325 K)
Boiling point	59–60 °C (138–140 °F; 332–333 K)
Solubility	Miscible with organic compounds

Hazards
- Occupational safety and health (OHS/OSH)
Main hazards	Irritant
- GHS labelling
Pictograms	(GHS07: Exclamation mark)
Signal word	Warning
Hazard statements	H315, H319, H335
Precautionary statements	P261, P264, P271, P280, P302+P352, P304+P340, P305+P351+P338, P312, P321, P332+P313, P337+P313, P362, P403+P233, P405, P501
Safety data sheet (SDS)	MSDS

Related compounds
Related compounds	Fluorocarbon
- Except where otherwise noted, data are given for materials in their standard state (at 25 °C [77 °F], 100 kPa). verify (what is ?) Infobox references

Perfluorocyclohexane or dodecafluorocyclohexane is a chemical which belongs to the class of fluorocarbons, sometimes referred to as perfluorocarbons or PFCs. Fluorocarbons and their derivatives are useful fluoropolymers, refrigerants, solvents, and anesthetics.

== Synthesis ==
Perfluorocyclohexane can be synthesized by fluorination of cyclohexane.

== Properties ==
Perfluorocyclohexane is chemically inert and thermally stable. It is a relatively non-toxic, clear, waxy solid, which has a high vapor pressure and therefore sublimes readily at room temperature.

The molecule predominantly exists in its chair conformation, in which it possesses D_{3d} molecular symmetry.
