= Hexafluoroethane (data page) =

Chemical data page

This page provides supplementary chemical data on Hexafluoroethane.

== Material Safety Data Sheet ==
The handling of this chemical may incur notable safety precautions. It is highly recommend that you seek the Material Safety Datasheet (MSDS) for this chemical from a reliable source such as SIRI, and follow its directions.

- MSDS at Airgas
- MSDS at Mathesontrigas
- MSDS at Air Liquide

== Structure and properties ==
Structure and properties
Index of refraction, n_{D}	?
Abbe number	?
Dielectric constant, ε_{r}	? ε_{0} at ? °C
Bond strength	?
Bond length	?
Bond angle	?
Magnetic susceptibility	?
Acentric factor	0.257
Compressibility factor	0.9875 at 15 °C
Dipole moment	0.0 D
Viscosity	13.64 μPa.s at 0 °C
Viscosity	14.4 μPa.s at 25 °C
Thermal conductivity	13.47 mW/(m.K) at 0 °C

== Thermodynamic properties ==
Phase behavior
Triple point	173.08 K (-100.07 °C), 26.60 kPa
Critical point	293 K (19.9 °C), 3082 kPa, 4.51 mol/dm^{3}
Std enthalpy change of fusion, Δ_{fus}H^{~~o~~}	? kJ/mol
Std entropy change of fusion, Δ_{fus}S^{~~o~~}	? J/(mol·K)
Std enthalpy change of vaporization, Δ_{vap}H^{~~o~~}	16.150 kJ/mol
Std entropy change of vaporization, Δ_{vap}S^{~~o~~}	82.88 J/(mol·K)
Solid properties
Std enthalpy change of formation, Δ_{f}H^{~~o~~}_{solid}	? kJ/mol
Standard molar entropy, S^{~~o~~}_{solid}	? J/(mol K)
Heat capacity, c_{p}	? J/(mol K)
Liquid properties
Std enthalpy change of formation, Δ_{f}H^{~~o~~}_{liquid}	? kJ/mol
Standard molar entropy, S^{~~o~~}_{liquid}	250.54 J/(mol K)
Heat capacity, c_{p}	131.29 J/(mol K)
Gas properties
Std enthalpy change of formation, Δ_{f}H^{~~o~~}_{gas}	-1343.90 kJ/mol
Standard molar entropy, S^{~~o~~}_{gas}	332.09 J/(mol K)
Heat capacity, c_{p}	106.3 J/(mol K)

== Spectral data ==
UV-Vis
λ_{max}	? nm
Extinction coefficient, ε	?
IR
Major absorption bands	0.1250, 0.2410, 0.4820, 0.9640, 1.9290 cm^{−1}
NMR
Proton NMR
Carbon-13 NMR
Other NMR data
MS
Masses of main fragments

This box:
- Except where noted otherwise, data relate to Standard temperature and pressure.
- Reliability of data general note.
