= Perfluorooctane =

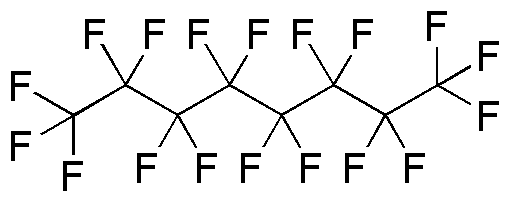

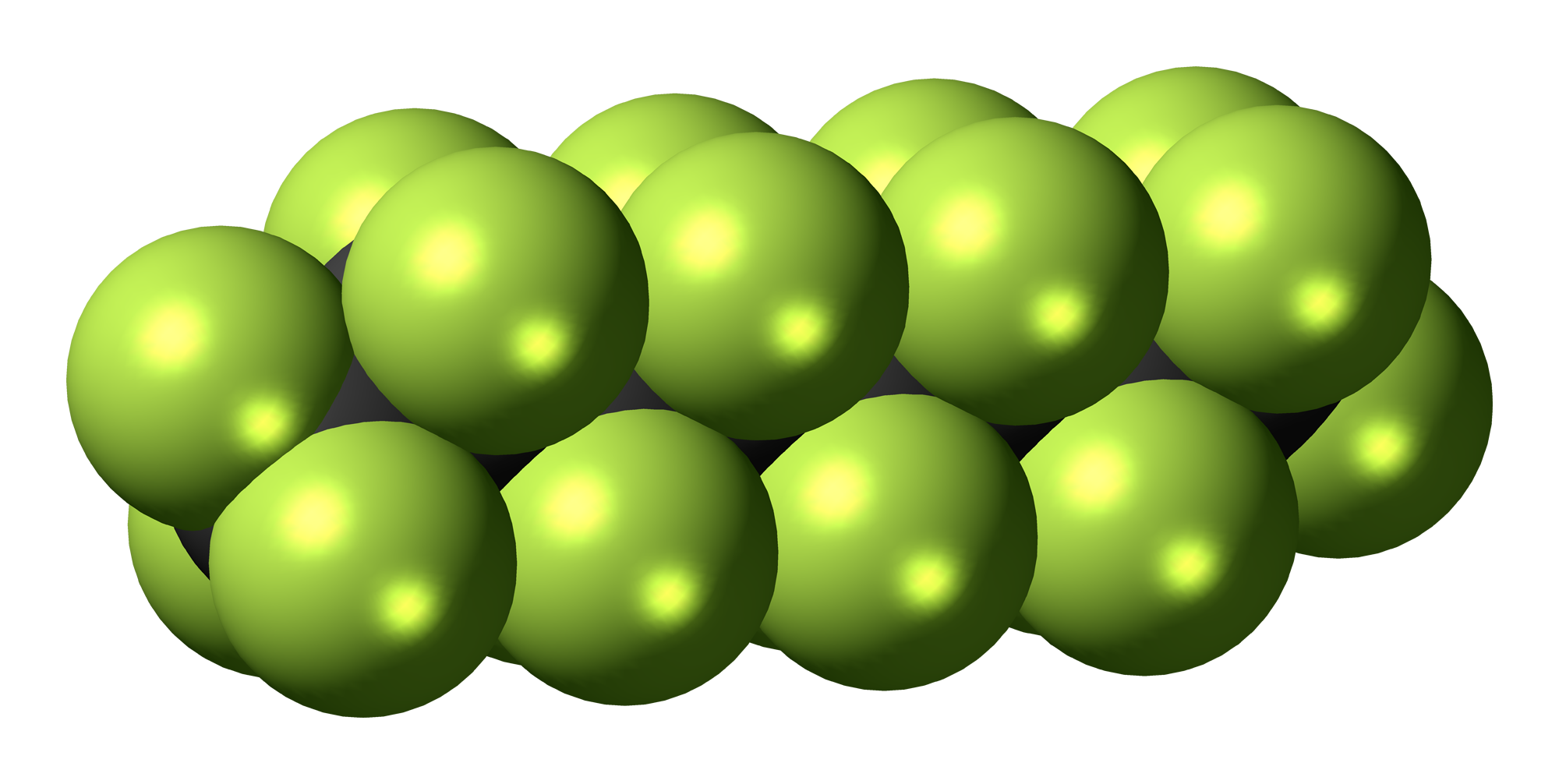

Names
- Preferred IUPAC name Octadecafluorooctane
- Other names PF5080

Identifiers
CAS Number	307-34-6
3D model (JSmol)	Interactive image
ChEBI	CHEBI:38826
ChemSpider	9018
ECHA InfoCard	100.005.637
EC Number	206-199-2
PubChem CID	9387
UNII	6P60ZBK0QL
CompTox Dashboard (EPA)	DTXSID0059794
- InChI: InChI=1S/C8F18/c9-1(10,3(13,14)5(17,18)7(21,22)23)2(11,12)4(15,16)6(19,20)8(24,25)26 Key: YVBBRRALBYAZBM-UHFFFAOYSA-N; InChI=1/C8F18/c9-1(10,3(13,14)5(17,18)7(21,22)23)2(11,12)4(15,16)6(19,20)8(24,25)26 Key: YVBBRRALBYAZBM-UHFFFAOYAG
- SMILES: FC(F)(F)C(F)(F)C(F)(F)C(F)(F)C(F)(F)C(F)(F)C(F)(F)C(F)(F)F

Properties
Chemical formula	C_{8}F_{18}
Molar mass	438.06 g/mol
Appearance	Clear, colorless liquid
Density	1.766 g/mL
Melting point	−25 °C (−13 °F; 248 K)
Boiling point	103 to 104 °C (217 to 219 °F; 376 to 377 K)
Solubility in water	10 ppm

Hazards
- Occupational safety and health (OHS/OSH)
Main hazards	None
Flash point	None
Autoignition temperature	None
- Except where otherwise noted, data are given for materials in their standard state (at 25 °C [77 °F], 100 kPa). verify (what is ?) Infobox references

Perfluorooctane, also known as octadecafluorooctane, is a fluorocarbon liquid—a perfluorinated derivative of the hydrocarbon octane. It can be a good substitute for insulating oil in high voltage electronics. In addition to heat transfer applications, it has also been used as a breathable fluid in partial liquid ventilation.

== Production ==
Perfluorooctane can be produced by the Fowler process or by electrochemical fluorination.

=== Fowler process ===
The Fowler process involves moderating the action of elemental fluorine with cobalt fluoride in the gas phase from octane.

=== Electrochemical fluorination ===
Electrolysis in hydrogen fluoride of nonanoic acid will produce both perfluorononanoic acid and perfluorooctane. Perfluorooctane manufactured this way is marketed under the name PF5080 (or FC77) by 3M as part of their Fluorinert range of heat transfer fluids.

== Applications ==
Perfluorooctane is chemically inert, but has useful physical properties, leading to its employment in diverse areas:

- Heat transfer agent
- Dielectric fluid
- Tamponade in eye surgery
