= Pentachlorofluoroethane =

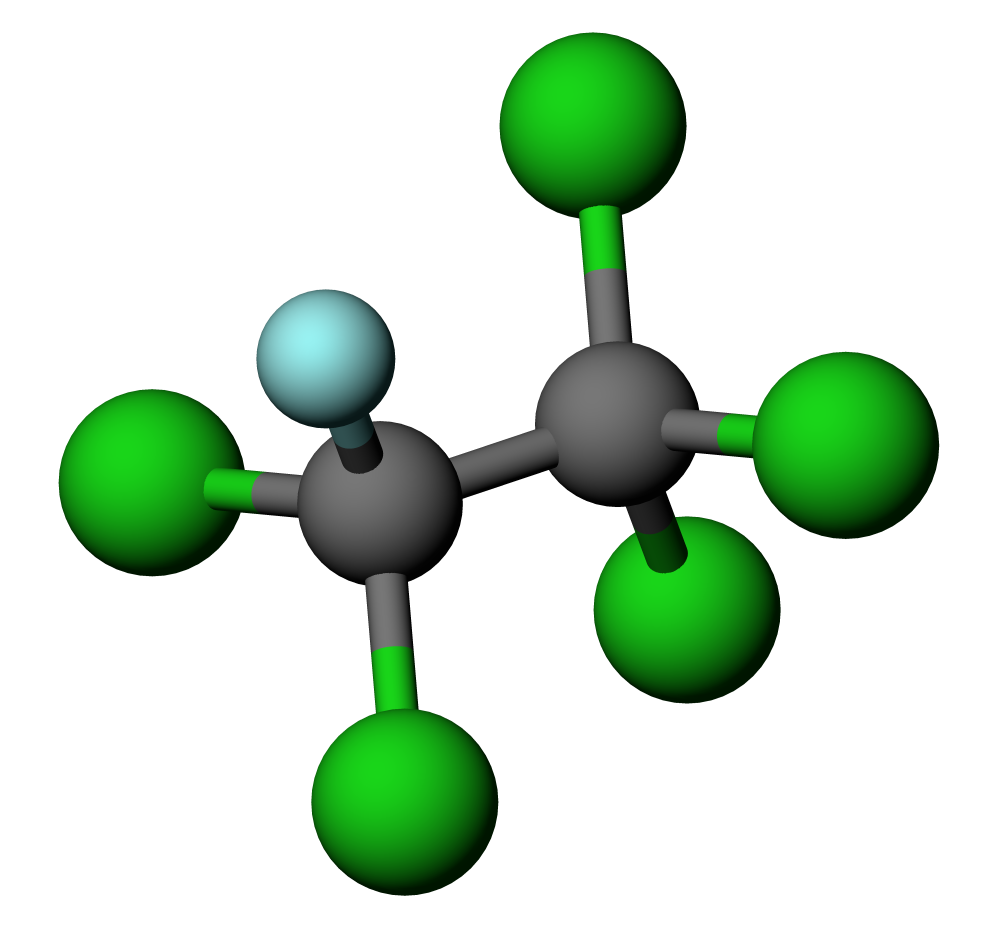

Names
- Preferred IUPAC name Pentachloro(fluoro)ethane
- Other names Pentachloromonofluoroethane; CFC-111; R-111

Identifiers
CAS Number	354-56-3
3D model (JSmol)	Interactive image
ChemSpider	55058
PubChem CID	61107
CompTox Dashboard (EPA)	DTXSID6059869
- InChI: InChI=1S/C2Cl5F/c3-1(4,5)2(6,7)8 Key: KQKBWZDTYSQPMD-UHFFFAOYSA-N; InChI=1/C2Cl5F/c3-1(4,5)2(6,7)8 Key: KQKBWZDTYSQPMD-UHFFFAOYAV
- SMILES: C(C(Cl)(Cl)Cl)(F)(Cl)Cl

Properties
Chemical formula	C_{2}Cl_{5}F
Molar mass	220.283
Melting point	101.5 °C (214.7 °F; 374.6 K)
Boiling point	135 °C (275 °F; 408 K)
- Except where otherwise noted, data are given for materials in their standard state (at 25 °C [77 °F], 100 kPa). verify (what is ?) Infobox references

Pentachlorofluoroethane is a chlorofluorocarbon once used as a propellant and refrigerant. Its production and consumption has been banned since January 1, 1996 in developed countries, and January 1, 2010 in developing countries under the Montreal Protocol because of its ozone-depleting potential.
