= Fluorocarbon =

Class of chemical compounds

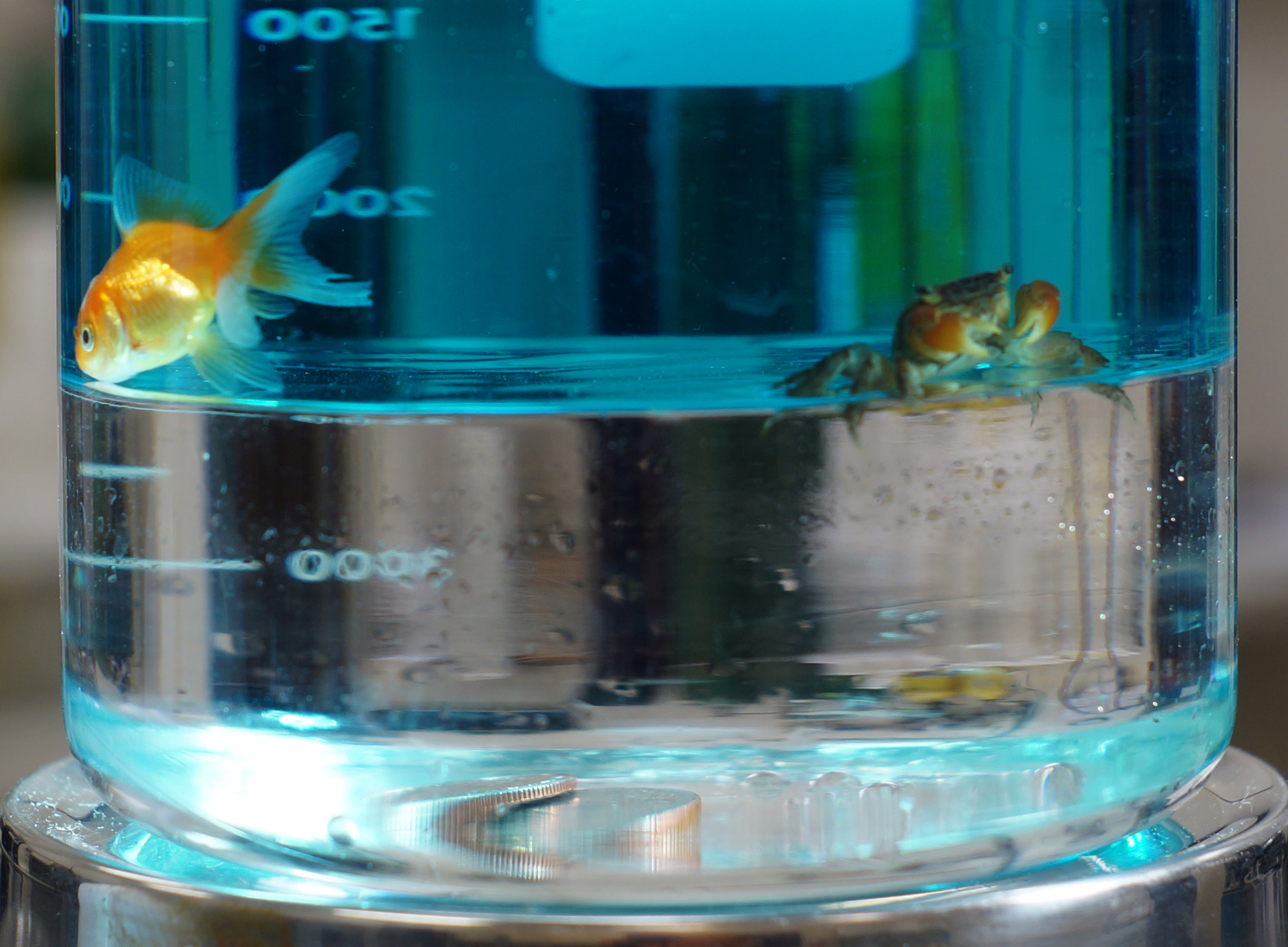
Immiscible layers of colored water (top) and much denser perfluoroheptane (bottom) in a beaker; a goldfish and crab cannot penetrate the boundary; coins rest at the bottom.

Fluorocarbons are chemical compounds with carbon-fluorine bonds. Compounds that contain many C-F bonds often have distinctive properties, e.g., enhanced stability, volatility, and hydrophobicity. Several fluorocarbons and their derivatives are commercial polymers, refrigerants, drugs, and anesthetics.

== Nomenclature ==
Perfluorocarbons or PFCs, are organofluorine compounds with the formula C_{x}F_{y}, meaning they contain only carbon and fluorine. The terminology is not strictly followed and many fluorine-containing organic compounds are also called fluorocarbons. Compounds with the prefix perfluoro- are hydrocarbons, including those with heteroatoms, wherein all C-H bonds have been replaced by C-F bonds. Fluorocarbons includes perfluoroalkanes, fluoroalkenes, fluoroalkynes, and perfluoroaromatic compounds.

== Perfluoroalkanes ==
=== Chemical properties ===
Perfluoroalkanes are very stable because of the strength of the carbon–fluorine bond, one of the strongest in organic chemistry. Its strength is a result of the electronegativity of fluorine imparting partial ionic character through partial charges on the carbon and fluorine atoms, which shorten and strengthen the bond (compared to carbon-hydrogen bonds) through favorable covalent interactions. Additionally, multiple carbon–fluorine bonds increase the strength and stability of other nearby carbon–fluorine bonds on the same geminal carbon, as the carbon has a higher positive partial charge. Furthermore, multiple carbon–fluorine bonds also strengthen the "skeletal" carbon–carbon bonds from the inductive effect. Therefore, saturated fluorocarbons are more chemically and thermally stable than their corresponding hydrocarbon counterparts, and indeed any other organic compound. They are susceptible to attack by very strong reductants, e.g. Birch reduction and very specialized organometallic complexes.

Fluorocarbons are colorless and have high density, up to over twice that of water. They are not miscible with most organic solvents (e.g., ethanol, acetone, ethyl acetate, and chloroform), but are miscible with some hydrocarbons (e.g., hexane in some cases). They have very low solubility in water, and water has a very low solubility in them (on the order of 10 ppm). They have low refractive indices.

$\ce{\overset{\delta+}{C}-\overset{\delta-}{F}}$
The partial charges in the polarized carbon–fluorine bond

As the high electronegativity of fluorine reduces the polarizability of the atom, fluorocarbons are only weakly susceptible to the fleeting dipoles that form the basis of the London dispersion force. As a result, fluorocarbons have low intermolecular attractive forces and are lipophobic in addition to being hydrophobic and non-polar. Reflecting the weak intermolecular forces these compounds exhibit low viscosities when compared to liquids of similar boiling points, low surface tension and low heats of vaporization. The low attractive forces in fluorocarbon liquids make them compressible (low bulk modulus) and able to dissolve gas relatively well. Smaller fluorocarbons are extremely volatile. There are five perfluoroalkane gases: tetrafluoromethane (bp −128 °C), hexafluoroethane (bp −78.2 °C), octafluoropropane (bp −36.5 °C), perfluoro-n-butane (bp −2.2 °C) and perfluoro-iso-butane (bp −1 °C). Nearly all other fluoroalkanes are liquids; the most notable exception is perfluorocyclohexane, which sublimes at 51 °C. Fluorocarbons also have low surface energies and high dielectric strengths.

Perfluoroalkanes

Carbon tetrafluoride, the simplest perfluoroalkane

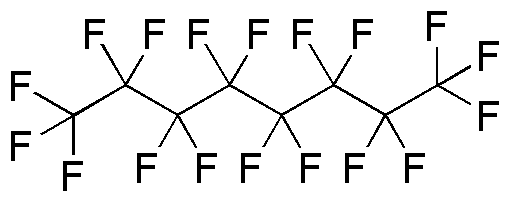
Perfluorooctane, a linear perfluoroalkane

Perfluoro-2-methylpentane, a branched perfluoroalkane

Perfluoro-1,3-dimethylcyclohexane, a cyclic perfluoroalkane

Perfluorodecalin, a polycyclic perfluoroalkane

=== Flammability ===
In the 1960s there was a lot of interest in fluorocarbons as anesthetics. The research did not produce any anesthetics, but the research included tests on the issue of flammability, and showed that the tested fluorocarbons were not flammable in air in any proportion, though most of the tests were in pure oxygen or pure nitrous oxide (gases of importance in anesthesiology).

Compound	Test conditions	Result
Hexafluoroethane	Lower flammability limit in oxygen	None
Perfluoropentane	Flash point in air	None
Perfluoropentane	Flash point in oxygen	−6 °C
Perfluoropentane	Flash point nitrous oxide	−32 °C
Perfluoromethylcyclohexane	Lower flammability limit in air	None
Perfluoromethylcyclohexane	Lower flammability limit in oxygen	8.3%
Perfluoromethylcyclohexane	Lower flammability limit in oxygen (50 °C)	7.4%
Perfluoromethylcyclohexane	Lower flammability limit in nitrous oxide	7.7%
Perfluoro-1,3-dimethylcyclohexane	Lower flammability limit in oxygen (50 °C)	5.2%
Perfluoromethyldecalin	Spontaneous ignition test in oxygen at 127 bar	No ignition at 500 °C
Perfluoromethyldecalin	Spontaneous ignition in adiabatic shock wave in oxygen, 0.98 to 186 bar	No ignition
Perfluoromethyldecalin	Spontaneous ignition in adiabatic shock wave in oxygen, 0.98 to 196 bar	Ignition

In 1993, 3M considered fluorocarbons as fire extinguishants to replace CFCs. This extinguishing effect has been attributed to their high heat capacity, which takes heat away from the fire. It has been suggested that an atmosphere containing a significant percentage of perfluorocarbons on a space station or similar would prevent fires altogether. When combustion does occur, toxic fumes result, including carbonyl fluoride, carbon monoxide, and hydrogen fluoride.

=== Gas dissolving properties ===
Perfluorocarbons dissolve relatively high volumes of gases. The high solubility of gases is attributed to the weak intermolecular interactions in these fluorocarbon fluids.

The table shows values for the mole fraction, x_{1}, of nitrogen dissolved, calculated from the Blood–gas partition coefficient, at 298.15 K (25 °C), 0.101325 MPa.

Liquid	10^{4}x_{1}	Concentration ( mM )
Water	0.118	0.65
Ethanol	3.57	6.12
Tetrahydrofuran	5.21	6.42
Acetone	5.42	7.32
Cyclohexane	7.73	7.16
Perfluoro-1,3-dimethylcyclohexane	31.9	14.6
Perfluoromethylcyclohexane	33.1	16.9

=== Manufacture ===
The development of the fluorocarbon industry coincided with World War II. Prior to that, fluorocarbons were prepared by reaction of fluorine with the hydrocarbon, i.e., direct fluorination. Because C-C bonds are readily cleaved by fluorine, direct fluorination mainly affords smaller perfluorocarbons, such as tetrafluoromethane, hexafluoroethane, and octafluoropropane.

==== Fowler process ====
A major breakthrough that allowed the large scale manufacture of fluorocarbons was the Fowler process. In this process, cobalt trifluoride is used as the source of fluorine. Illustrative is the synthesis of perfluorohexane:

C_{6}H_{14} + 28 CoF_{3} → C_{6}F_{14} + 14 HF + 28 CoF_{2}

The resulting cobalt difluoride is then regenerated, sometimes in a separate reactor:

2 CoF_{2} + F_{2} → 2 CoF_{3}

Industrially, both steps are combined, for example in the manufacture of the Flutec range of fluorocarbons by F2 chemicals Ltd, using a vertical stirred bed reactor, with hydrocarbon introduced at the bottom, and fluorine introduced halfway up the reactor. The fluorocarbon vapor is recovered from the top.

==== Electrochemical fluorination ====
Electrochemical fluorination (ECF) (also known as the Simons' process) involves electrolysis of a substrate dissolved in hydrogen fluoride. As fluorine is itself manufactured by the electrolysis of hydrogen fluoride, ECF is a rather more direct route to fluorocarbons. The process proceeds at low voltage (5 – 6 V) so that free fluorine is not liberated. The choice of substrate is restricted as ideally it should be soluble in hydrogen fluoride. Ethers and tertiary amines are typically employed. To make perfluorohexane, trihexylamine is used, for example:

N(C_{6}H_{13})_{3} + 45 HF → 3 C_{6}F_{14} + NF_{3} + 42 H_{2}

The perfluorinated amine will also be produced:

N(C_{6}H_{13})_{3} + 39 HF → N(C_{6}F_{13})_{3} + 39 H_{2}

=== Environmental and health concerns ===
Fluoroalkanes are generally inert and non-toxic.

Fluoroalkanes are not ozone depleting, as they contain no chlorine or bromine atoms, and they are sometimes used as replacements for ozone-depleting chemicals. The term fluorocarbon is used rather loosely to include any chemical containing fluorine and carbon, including chlorofluorocarbons, which are ozone depleting.

Perfluoroalkanes used in medical procedures are rapidly excreted from the body, primarily via expiration with the rate of excretion as a function of the vapour pressure; the half-life for octafluoropropane is less than 2 minutes, compared to about a week for perfluorodecalin.

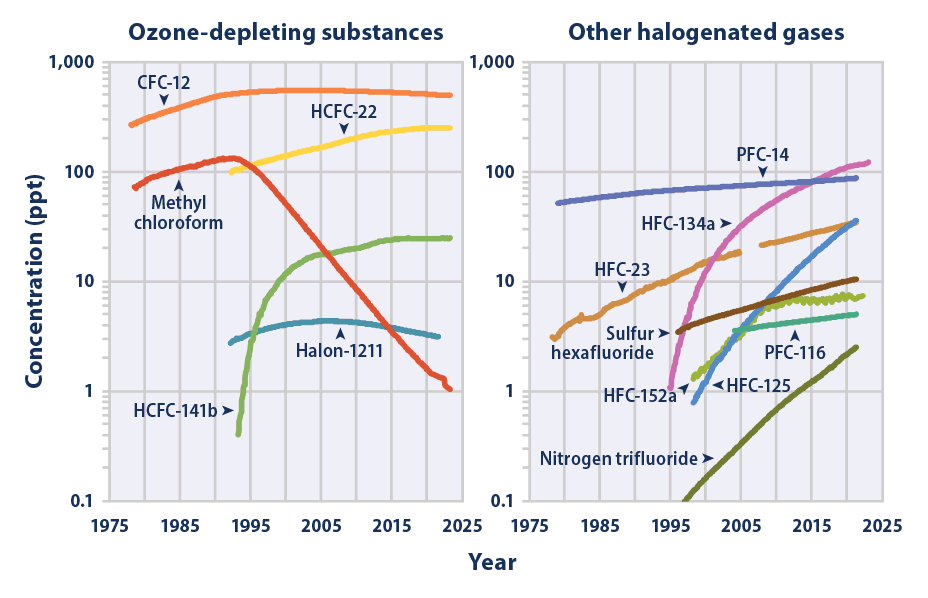
Atmospheric concentration of PFC-14 and PFC-116 compared to similar man-made halogenated gases between years 1978 and 2015 (right graph). Note the logarithmic scale.

Low-boiling perfluoroalkanes are potent greenhouse gases, in part due to their very long atmospheric lifetime, and their use is covered by the Kyoto Protocol. The global warming potential (compared to that of carbon dioxide) of many gases can be found in the IPCC 5th assessment report, with an extract below for a few perfluoroalkanes.

Name	Chemical formula	Lifetime (y)	GWP (100 years)
PFC-14	CF_{4}	50000	6630
PFC-116	C_{2}F_{6}	10000	11100
PFC-c216	c-C_{3}F_{6}	3000	9200
PFC-218	C_{3}F_{8}	2600	8900
PFC-318	c-C_{4}F_{8}	3200	9540

The aluminium smelting industry has been a major source of atmospheric perfluorocarbons (tetrafluoromethane and hexafluoroethane especially), produced as by-product of the electrolysis process. However, the industry has been actively involved in reducing emissions in recent years.

=== Applications ===
As they are inert, perfluoroalkanes have essentially no chemical uses, but their physical properties have led to their use in many diverse applications. These include:

- Perfluorocarbon tracer
- Liquid dielectric
- Chemical vapor deposition
- Organic Rankine cycle
- Fluorous biphasic catalysis
- Cosmetics
- Ski waxes

As well as several medical uses:

- Contrast-enhanced ultrasound
- Oxygen Therapeutics
- Blood substitute
- Liquid breathing
- Eye surgery
- Tattoo removal

== Fluoroalkenes and fluoroalkynes ==
Unsaturated fluorocarbons are far more reactive than fluoroalkanes. Although difluoroacetylene is unstable (as is typical for related alkynes, see dichloroacetylene), hexafluoro-2-butyne and related fluorinated alkynes are well known.

Unsaturated fluorocarbons

Perfluoroisobutene, a reactive and highly toxic fluoroalkene gas

Tetrafluoroethylene, an important perfluorinated monomer.

Hexafluoropropylene, another important perfluoroalkene.

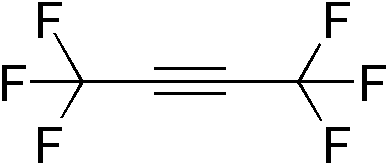
Hexafluoro-2-butyne, a perfluoroalkyne.

=== Polymerization ===
Fluoroalkenes polymerize more exothermically than normal alkenes. Unsaturated fluorocarbons have a driving force towards sp^{3} hybridization due to the electronegative fluorine atoms seeking a greater share of bonding electrons with reduced s character in orbitals. The most famous member of this class is tetrafluoroethylene, which is used to manufacture polytetrafluoroethylene (PTFE), better known under the trade name Teflon.

=== Environmental and health concerns ===
Fluoroalkenes and fluorinated alkynes are reactive and many are toxic for example perfluoroisobutene. To produce polytetrafluoroethylene various fluorinated surfactants are used, in the process known as Emulsion polymerization, and the surfactant included in the polymer can bioaccumulate.

== Perfluoroaromatic compounds ==
Perfluoroaromatic compounds contain only carbon and fluorine, like other fluorocarbons, but also contain an aromatic ring. The three most important examples are hexafluorobenzene, octafluorotoluene, and octafluoronaphthalene.

Perfluoroaromatic compounds

Hexafluorobenzene

Perfluoroaromatic compounds can be manufactured via the Fowler process, like fluoroalkanes, but the conditions must be adjusted to prevent full fluorination. They can also be made by heating the corresponding perchloroaromatic compound with potassium fluoride at high temperature (typically 500 °C), during which the chlorine atoms are replaced by fluorine atoms. A third route is defluorination of the fluoroalkane; for example, octafluorotoluene can be made from perfluoromethylcyclohexane by heating to 500 °C with a nickel or iron catalyst.

Perfluoroaromatic compounds are relatively volatile for their molecular weight, with melting and boiling points similar to the corresponding aromatic compound, as the table below shows. They have high density and are non-flammable. For the most part, they are colorless liquids. Unlike the perfluoralkanes, they tend to be miscible with common solvents.

Compound	Melting point (°C)	Boiling point (°C)
Hexafluorobenzene	5.3	80.5
Benzene	5.5	80.1
Octafluorotoluene	<−70	102–103
Toluene	−95	110.6
Perfluoro(ethylbenzene)		114–115
Ethylbenzene	−93.9	136.2
Octafluoronaphthalene	86–87	209
Naphthalene	80.2	217.9

== See also ==
- Category:Fluorocarbons
- Fluorochemical industry
- Hydrofluorocarbon
- Fluorographene
- Perfluorocycloalkene (PFCA)
