= Cobalt fluoride =

Cobalt fluoride may refer to:

- Cobalt(II) fluoride (cobalt difluoride, CoF_{2}), a red solid
- Cobalt(III) fluoride (cobalt trifluoride, CoF_{3}), a brown solid
