= Carbon tetrafluoride =

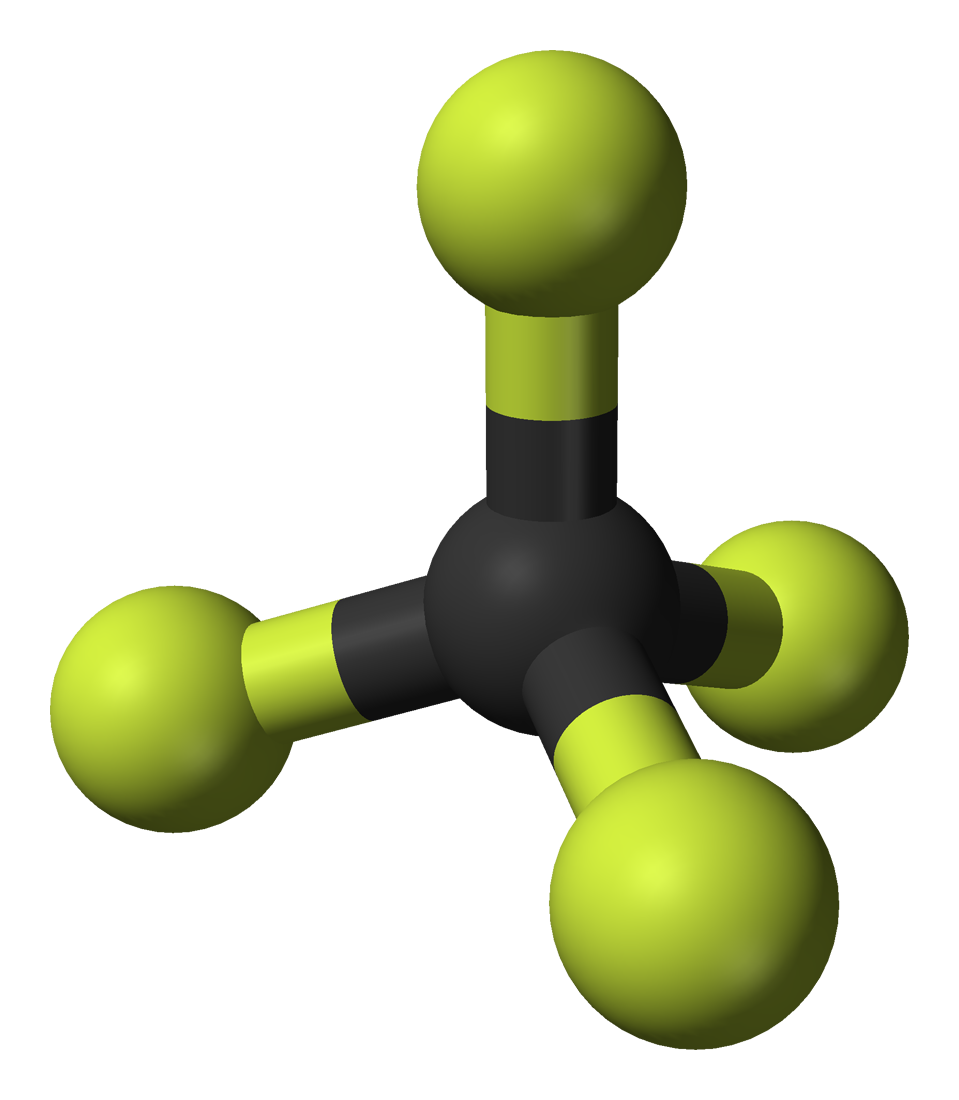

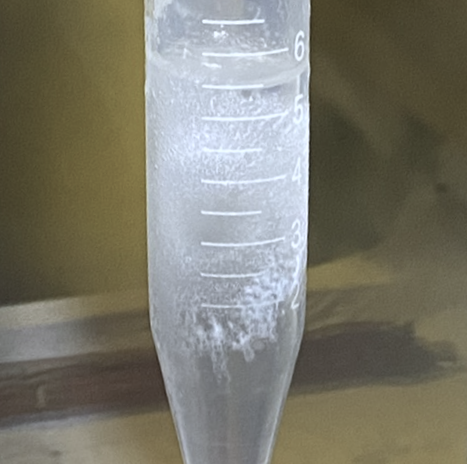

Names
- IUPAC names Tetrafluoromethane; Carbon tetrafluoride
- Other names Carbon tetrafluoride, Perfluoromethane, Tetrafluorocarbon, Freon 14, Halon 14, Arcton 0, CFC 14, PFC 14, R 14, UN 1982

Identifiers
CAS Number	75-73-0
3D model (JSmol)	Interactive image
ChEBI	CHEBI:38825
ChemSpider	6153
ECHA InfoCard	100.000.815
EC Number	200-896-5
PubChem CID	6393
RTECS number	FG4920000
UNII	94WG9QG0JN
CompTox Dashboard (EPA)	DTXSID30894934 DTXSID2041757, DTXSID30894934
- InChI: InChI=1S/CF4/c2-1(3,4)5 Key: TXEYQDLBPFQVAA-UHFFFAOYSA-N; InChI=1/CF4/c2-1(3,4)5
- SMILES: FC(F)(F)F

Properties
Chemical formula	CF_{4}
Molar mass	88.005 g·mol^{−1}
Appearance	Colorless gas
Odor	odorless
Density	3.72 g/L, gas (15 °C)
Melting point	−183.6 °C (−298.5 °F; 89.5 K)
Boiling point	−127.8 °C (−198.0 °F; 145.3 K)
Critical point (T, P)	−45.55 °C (−50.0 °F; 227.6 K), 36.91 standard atmospheres (3,739.9 kPa; 542.4 psi)
Solubility in water	0.005%_{V} at 20 °C; 0.0038%_{V} at 25 °C
Solubility	soluble in benzene, chloroform
Vapor pressure	106.5 kPa at −127 °C
Henry's law constant (k_{H})	5.15 atm-cu m/mole
Refractive index (n_{D})	1.0004823
Viscosity	17.32 μPa·s

Structure
Coordination geometry	Tetragonal
Molecular shape	Tetrahedral
Dipole moment	0 D

Hazards
- Occupational safety and health (OHS/OSH)
Main hazards	Simple asphyxiant and greenhouse gas
NFPA 704 (fire diamond)	1 0 0 SA
Flash point	Non-flammable
Safety data sheet (SDS)	ICSC 0575

Related compounds
Other anions	Tetrachloromethane; Tetrabromomethane; Tetraiodomethane
Other cations	Silicon tetrafluoride Germanium tetrafluoride Tin tetrafluoride Lead tetrafluoride
Related fluoromethanes	Fluoromethane; Difluoromethane; Fluoroform
- Except where otherwise noted, data are given for materials in their standard state (at 25 °C [77 °F], 100 kPa). verify (what is ?) Infobox references

Tetrafluoromethane, also known as carbon tetrafluoride or R-14, is the simplest perfluorocarbon (CF_{4}). As its IUPAC name indicates, tetrafluoromethane is the perfluorinated counterpart to the hydrocarbon methane. It can also be classified as a haloalkane or halomethane. Tetrafluoromethane is a useful refrigerant but also a potent greenhouse gas. Although its atmospheric concentration is small, it persists in the atmosphere for 50,000 years, giving it a very high global warming potential. It has a very high bond strength due to the nature of the carbon–fluorine bond.

== Bonding ==
Because of the multiple carbon–fluorine bonds, and the high electronegativity of fluorine, the carbon in tetrafluoromethane has a significant positive partial charge which strengthens and shortens the four carbon–fluorine bonds by providing additional ionic character. Carbon–fluorine bonds are the strongest single bonds in organic chemistry. Additionally, they strengthen as more carbon–fluorine bonds are added to the same carbon atom. In the one-carbon organofluorine compounds represented by molecules of fluoromethane, difluoromethane, trifluoromethane, and tetrafluoromethane, the carbon–fluorine bonds are strongest in tetrafluoromethane. This effect is due to the increased coulombic attractions between the fluorine atoms and the carbon because the carbon has a positive partial charge of 0.76.

== Preparation ==
Tetrafluoromethane is the product when any carbon compound, including carbon itself, is burned in an atmosphere of fluorine. With hydrocarbons, hydrogen fluoride is a coproduct. It can also be prepared by the fluorination of carbon dioxide, carbon monoxide or phosgene with sulfur tetrafluoride. Commercially it is manufactured by the reaction of hydrogen fluoride with dichlorodifluoromethane or chlorotrifluoromethane; it is also produced during the electrolysis of metal fluorides MF, MF_{2} using a carbon electrode.

Although it can be made from myriad precursors using fluorine, elemental fluorine can be expensive and difficult to handle. Consequently, CF_{4} is prepared on an industrial scale using hydrogen fluoride:

CCl_{2}F_{2} + 2 HF → CF_{4} + 2 HCl

=== Laboratory synthesis ===
Carbon tetrafluoride was first reported by fluorine chemist Henri Moissan in 1890 by the reaction of carbon tetrachloride and silver fluoride.

Tetrafluoromethane and silicon tetrafluoride can be prepared in the laboratory by the reaction of silicon carbide with fluorine.

SiC + 4 F_{2} → CF_{4} + SiF_{4}

== Reactions ==
Tetrafluoromethane, like other fluorocarbons, is very stable due to the strength of its carbon–fluorine bonds. The bonds in tetrafluoromethane have a bonding energy of 515 kJ⋅mol^{−1}. As a result, it is inert to acids and hydroxides. However, it reacts explosively with alkali metals. Thermal decomposition or combustion of CF_{4} produces toxic gases (carbonyl fluoride and carbon monoxide) and in the presence of water will also yield hydrogen fluoride.

It is very slightly soluble in water (about 20 mg⋅L^{−1}), but highly soluble in organic solvents. When liquefied, it is completely miscible in organic solvents.

== Uses ==
Tetrafluoromethane is sometimes used as a low temperature refrigerant (R-14). It is used in electronics microfabrication alone or in combination with oxygen as a plasma etchant for silicon, silicon dioxide, and silicon nitride. It also has uses in neutron detectors.

== Environmental effects ==
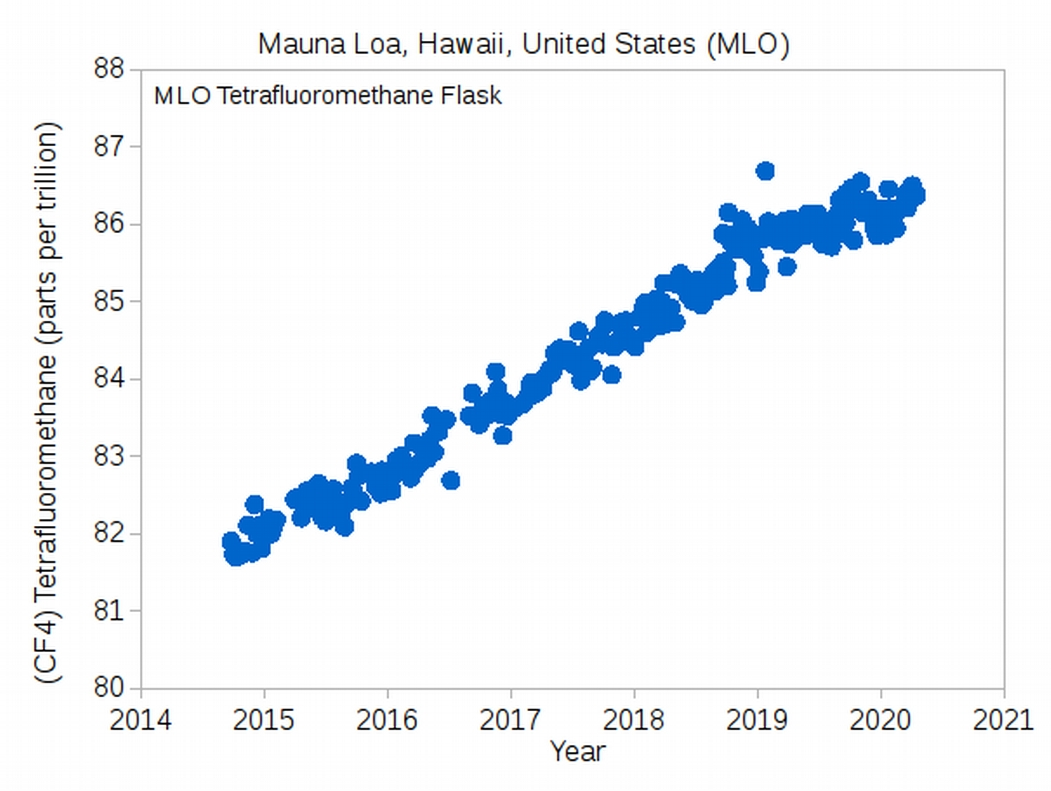
Mauna Loa tetrafluoromethane (CF_{4}) timeseries.

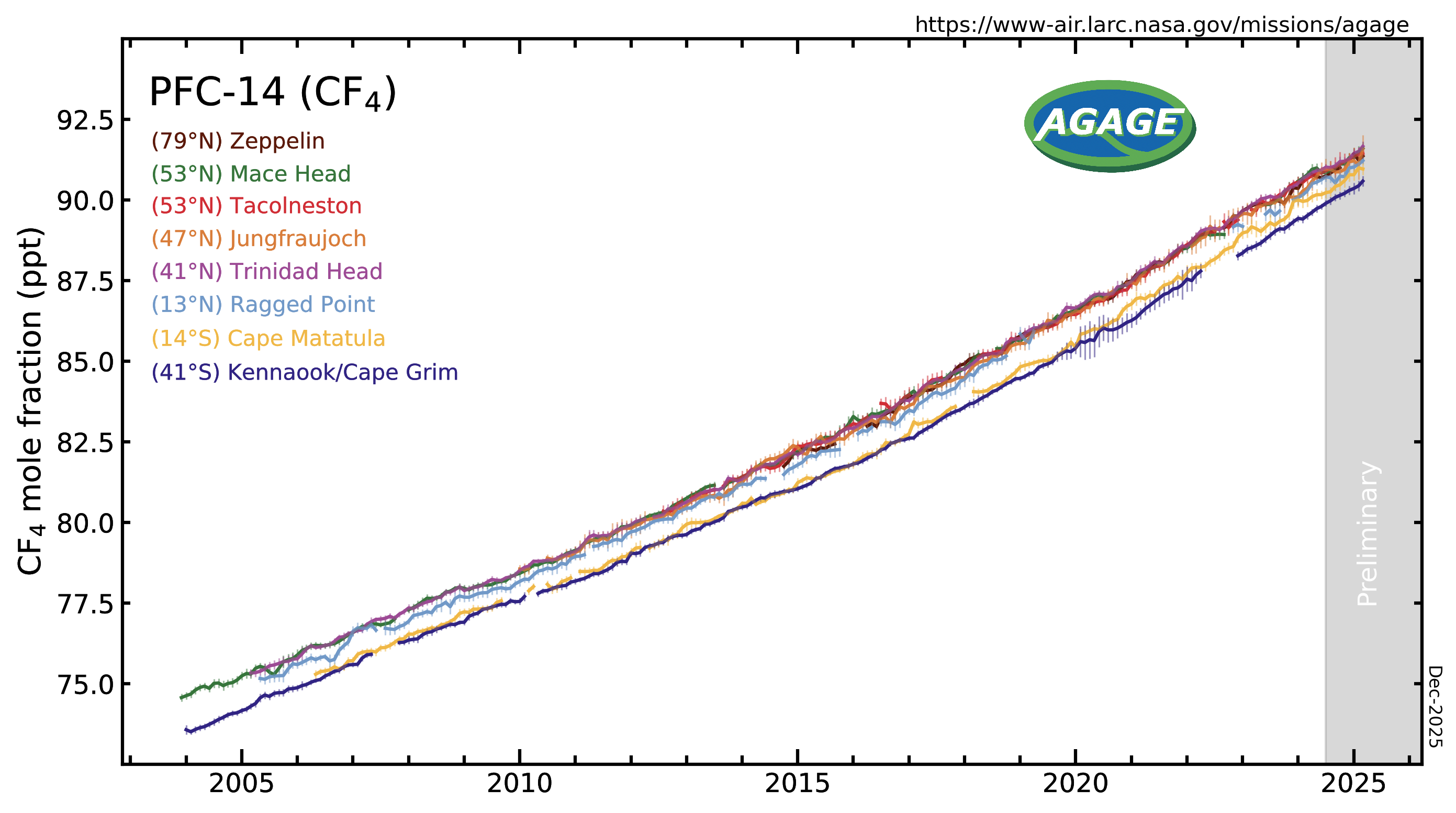
PFC-14 measured by the Advanced Global Atmospheric Gases Experiment (AGAGE) in the lower atmosphere (troposphere) at stations around the world. Abundances are given as pollution free monthly mean mole fractions in parts-per-trillion.

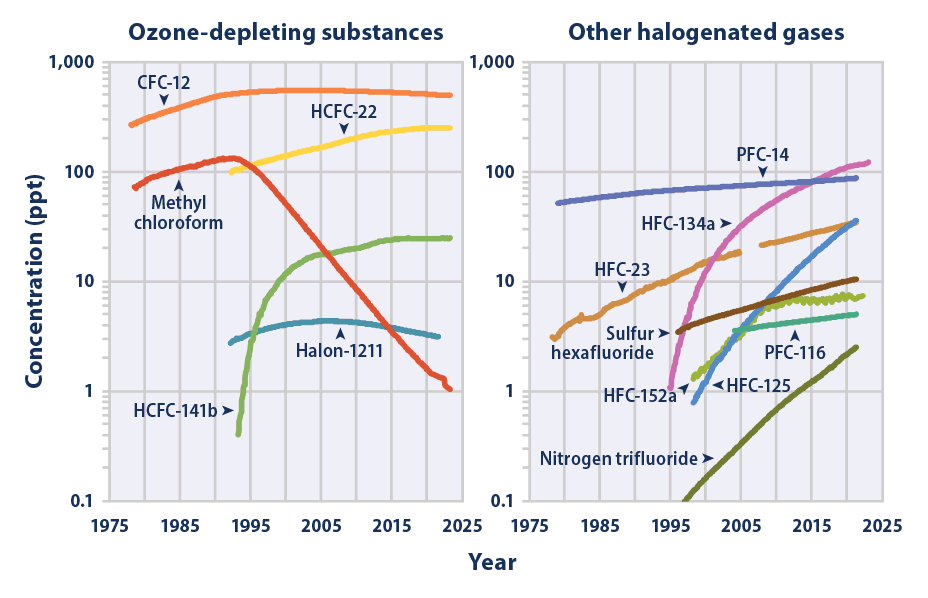
Atmospheric concentration of CF_{4} (PFC-14) vs. similar man-made gases (right graph). Note the log scale.

Tetrafluoromethane is a potent greenhouse gas that contributes to the greenhouse effect. It is very stable, has an atmospheric lifetime of 50,000 years, and a high greenhouse warming potential 6,500 times that of CO_{2}.

Tetrafluoromethane is the most abundant perfluorocarbon in the atmosphere, where it is designated as PFC-14. Its atmospheric concentration is growing: its preindustrial concentration produced via radioactive oxidation of fluorite and reaction with organic molecules was less than 40 parts per trillion. (Note: This figure is for all perfluorocarbons: no data for the preindustrial abundance of individual compounds of this class exist.) As of 2019, the man-made gases CFC-11 and CFC-12 continue to contribute a stronger radiative forcing than PFC-14.

Although structurally similar to chlorofluorocarbons (CFCs), tetrafluoromethane does not deplete the ozone layer because the carbon–fluorine bond is much stronger than that between carbon and chlorine.

Main industrial emissions of tetrafluoromethane besides hexafluoroethane are produced during production of aluminium using Hall-Héroult process. CF_{4} also is produced as product of the breakdown of more complex compounds such as halocarbons.

== Health risks ==
Due to its density, tetrafluoromethane can displace air, creating an asphyxiation hazard in inadequately ventilated areas. Otherwise, it is normally harmless due to its stability.

== See also ==
- Trifluoromethane
- Hexafluoroethane
- Octafluoropropane
