= Perfluoropentane =

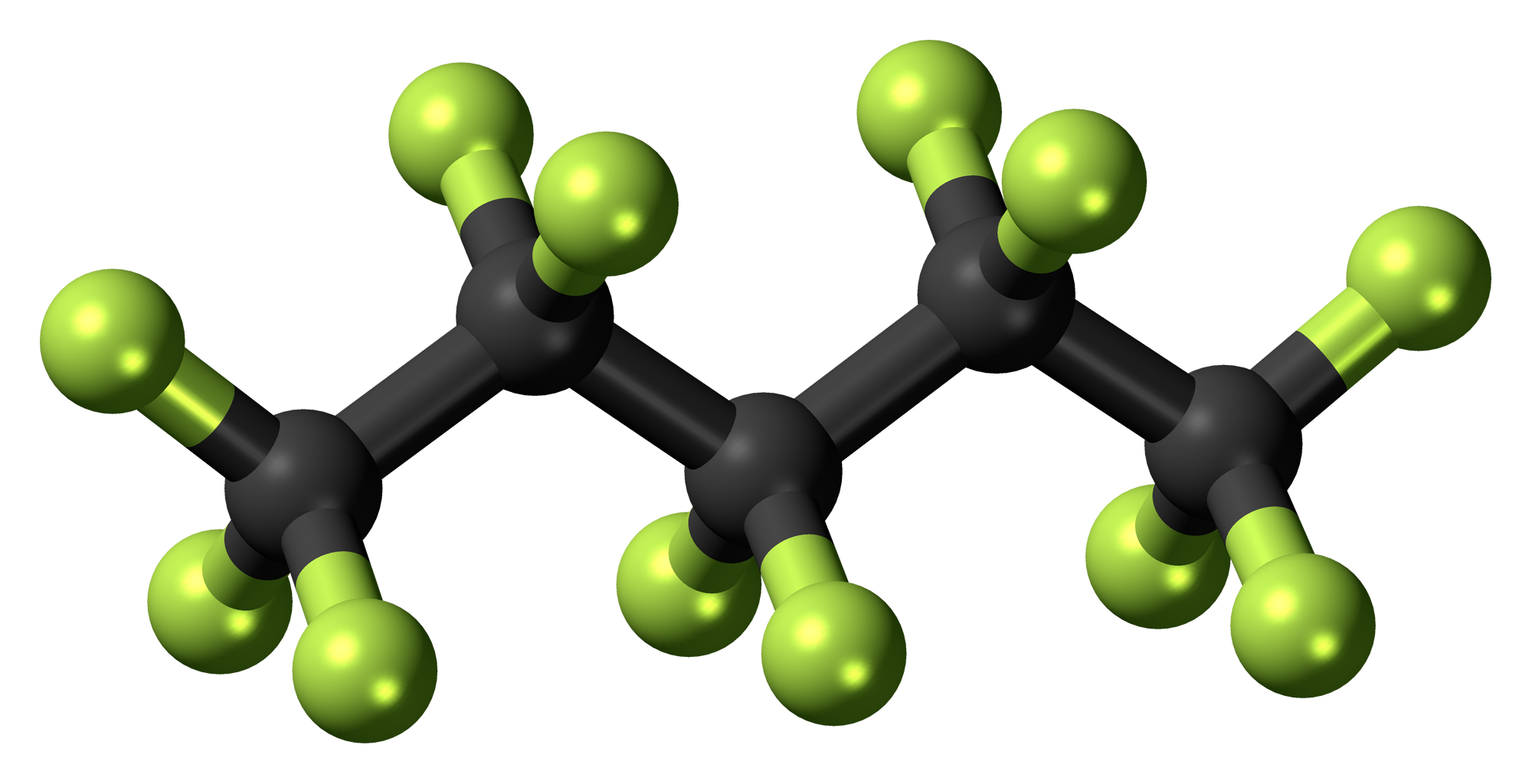

Names
- Preferred IUPAC name Dodecafluoropentane
- Other names Perfluoropentane

Identifiers
CAS Number	678-26-2
3D model (JSmol)	Interactive image
Beilstein Reference	1712388
ChEBI	CHEBI:39428
ChEMBL	ChEMBL1899801
ChemSpider	12154
ECHA InfoCard	100.010.589
EC Number	211-647-5
KEGG	D05436
PubChem CID	12675
UNII	483AU1Y5CZ
CompTox Dashboard (EPA)	DTXSID3046613
- InChI: InChI=1S/C5F12/c6-1(7,2(8,9)4(12,13)14)3(10,11)5(15,16)17 Key: NJCBUSHGCBERSK-UHFFFAOYSA-N; InChI=1/C5F12/c6-1(7,2(8,9)4(12,13)14)3(10,11)5(15,16)17 Key: NJCBUSHGCBERSK-UHFFFAOYAH
- SMILES: C(C(C(F)(F)F)(F)F)(C(C(F)(F)F)(F)F)(F)F

Properties
Chemical formula	C_{5}F_{12}
Molar mass	288.036 g·mol^{−1}
Density	1.63 g/mL (liquid, 25 °C); 1.59 g/mL (liquid, 35 °C); 12.25 kg/m³ (gas, 1 atm, 10 times air density)
Melting point	−115 °C (−175 °F; 158 K)
Boiling point	28 °C (82 °F; 301 K); Heat of vaporization = 21 cal/g
Vapor pressure	83.99 kPa (25 °C)
Viscosity	0.652 mPa*s (25 °C)

Thermochemistry
Heat capacity (C)	0.26 cal/(g • K)

Pharmacology
ATC code	V08DA03 (WHO)

Hazards
- GHS labelling
Pictograms	(GHS07: Exclamation mark)
Signal word	Warning
Hazard statements	H315, H319, H335
Precautionary statements	P261, P264, P271, P280, P302+P352, P304+P340, P305+P351+P338, P312, P321, P332+P313, P337+P313, P362, P403+P233, P405, P501
- Except where otherwise noted, data are given for materials in their standard state (at 25 °C [77 °F], 100 kPa). Infobox references

Perfluoropentane (PFP) or dodecafluoropentane; also known as Perflenapent (INN/USAN) is a fluorocarbon, the fluorinated analogue of pentane. It is a liquid that boils at slightly over room temperature.

It has several biomedical applications including: propellant for pressurized metered dose inhalers; gas core in microbubble ultrasound contrast agents; and occlusion therapy via the conversion of nanometer liquid droplets into micrometer sized gas microbubbles (acoustic droplet vaporization).
