= Perfluoroheptane =

n-Perfluoroheptane

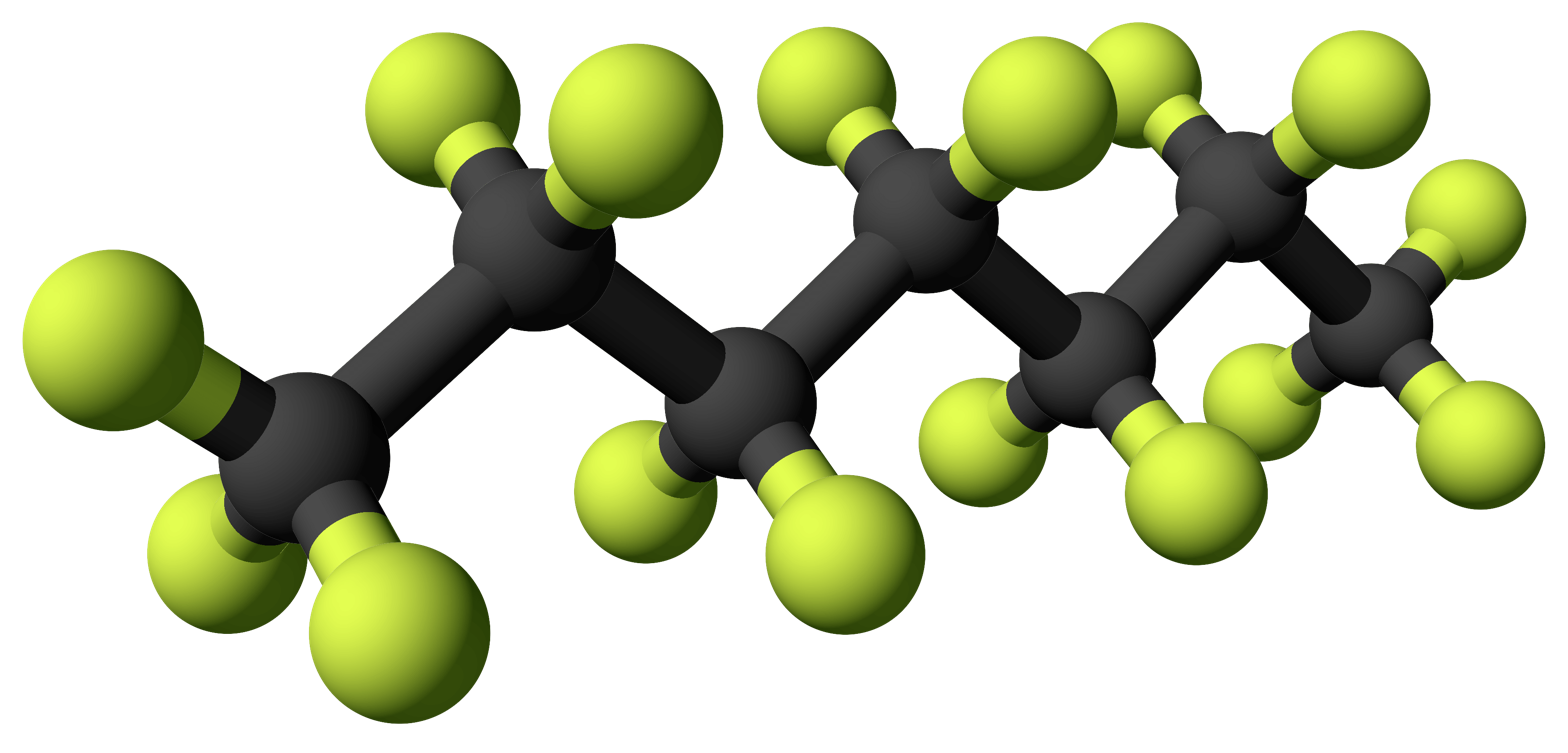
- Ball-and-stick model of perfluoroheptane

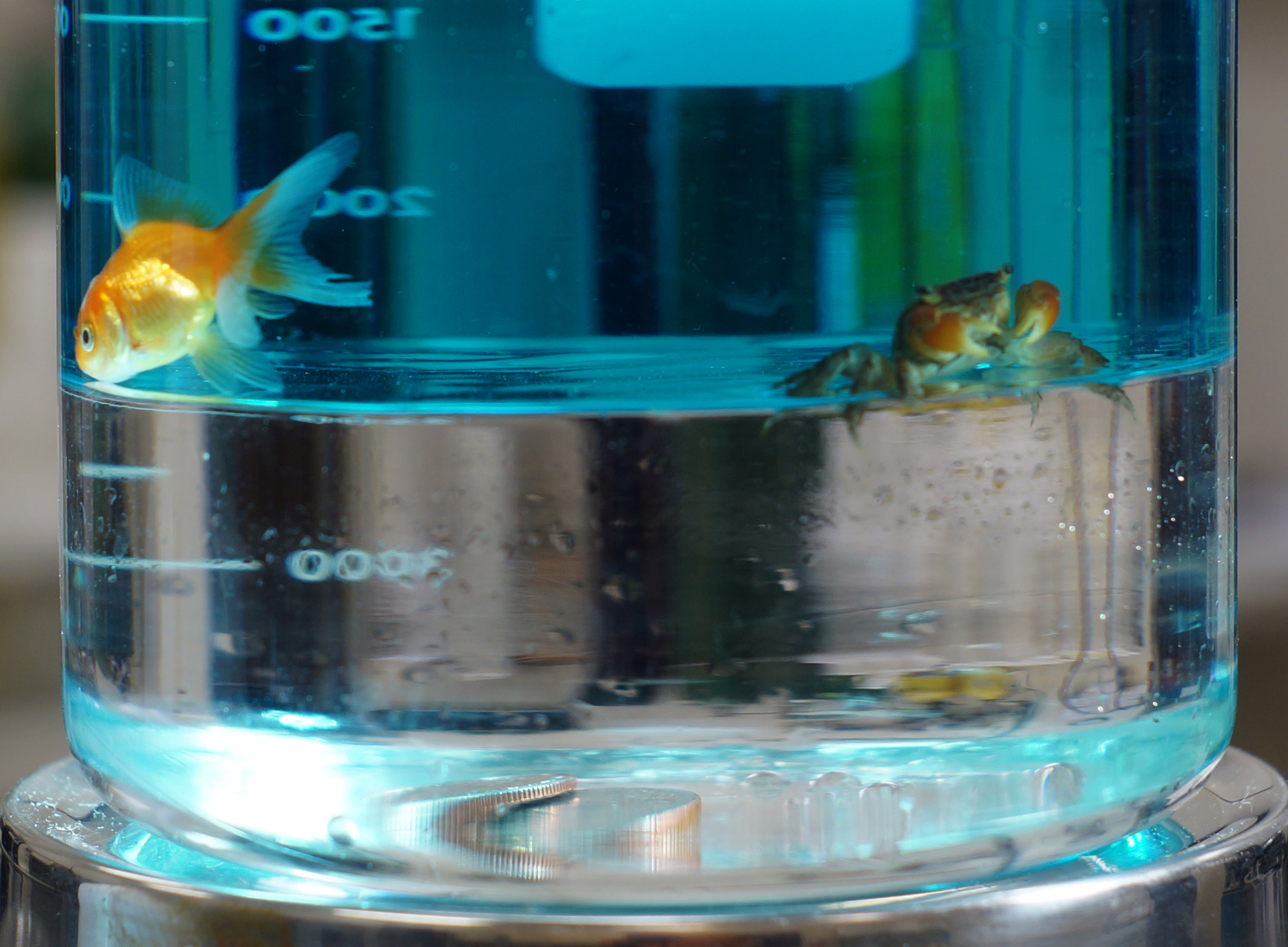
- Coloured water (top) and perfluoroheptane (bottom). Perfluoroheptane is hydrophobic and is denser than water, so it sinks to the bottom and the animals pictured cannot penetrate it.

Names
- Preferred IUPAC name Hexadecafluoroheptane

Identifiers
CAS Number	335-57-9
3D model (JSmol)	Interactive image
ChemSpider	9179
ECHA InfoCard	100.005.812
PubChem CID	9553
UNII	I23ZVD1P1L
CompTox Dashboard (EPA)	DTXSID8052019
- InChI: InChI=1S/C7F16/c8-1(9,2(10,11)4(14,15)6(18,19)20)3(12,13)5(16,17)7(21,22)23 Key: LGUZHRODIJCVOC-UHFFFAOYSA-N
- SMILES: C(C(C(C(F)(F)F)(F)F)(F)F)(C(C(C(F)(F)F)(F)F)(F)F)(F)F

Properties
Chemical formula	C_{7}F_{16}
Molar mass	388.051 g·mol^{−1}
Appearance	clear liquid
Density	1.706 g/cm^{3}
Boiling point	80~82°C
- Except where otherwise noted, data are given for materials in their standard state (at 25 °C [77 °F], 100 kPa). Infobox references

Perfluoroheptane, C_{7}F_{16}, (usually referring to the straight chain molecule called n-perfluoroheptane) is a perfluorocarbon. It is hydrophobic (water-insoluble) and oleophobic (oil-insoluble). It is used in deacidification of paper as a medium carrying powdered magnesium oxide.
