= Perfluorocarbon tracer =

Perfluorocarbon tracers (PFTs) are a range of perfluorocarbons used in flow tracers and other tracing applications. They are used by releasing the PFT at a certain point, and determining the concentration of that PFT at another set of points, allowing the flow from the source to the points to be determined.

== Properties ==
PFTs are believed to be non-toxic and chemically inert, clear, colourless liquids. They are non-flammable and nonradioactive compounds that do not occur in nature at all, so background levels are very low, but they can be detected at extremely low concentrations.

There is a range of PFTs available commercially, allowing the experimenter to release different PFTs at the same time. Cyclic perfluorocarbons, such as perfluoromethylhexane and perfluoro-1,3-dimethylcyclohexane, are generally believed to be better than acyclic ones as they can be detected at lower levels.

== Procedure ==
The PFT can be released in a variety of ways, depending on the application, and may be as simple as spraying it into the air. Samples are then collected at set times and locations, and either taken to a laboratory for analysis, or analysed in the field.

Analysis of the samples typically involves three parts; preparation, chromatography and detection. Preparation involves removal of other impurities, for example, mixing with hydrogen then passing over a catalyst to convert oxygen to water, which is then removed with silica gel. The sample is then admitted to a gas chromatograph. This separates the different PFTs, so a concentration value can be determined for each one.

There are two ways in which the PFTs are then detected; using an electron capture detector or negative ion mass spectrometry. Both techniques involve bombarding the sample with electrons, and measuring the negative ions produced. Perfluorocarbons have a particularly high affinity for electrons, so are detected in low concentrations.

Alternatively, the chromatography can be omitted, and the different PFTs determined from their different masses in the mass spectrum.

PFTs can be detected in concentrations as low as 1 part in 10^{15} by volume (1 femtolitre in a litre).

== Applications ==
Oil reservoirs are routinely mapped by injecting a PFT into one borehole and measuring the concentration at adjacent boreholes. In this way, geologists can build up an image of the reservoir.

Traditional underground high-tension cables are constructed either with internal oil ducts or channels or by the use of a pipe through which the insulated conductor is installed. In either design, the system is then filled with pressurised, de-gassed oil. The oil's primary function is to improve the insulating properties of the cable; but occasionally, leaks can occur through cable joints, oil system fittings or cable sheath damage. The leak is initially identified by the loss of liquid from the system, and its location involves engineers digging up the road, freezing a section of the cable and seeing if the level is still going down, then choosing a new point to dig and re-freeze, which could take several holes to isolate the leak. If a PFT is injected into the oil, there will be a relatively high concentration of PFT above the leak, which can be pin-pointed to within a few feet, requiring only a single hole to be dug right where the leak is.

PFTs have been used to follow air movement, for tracing the flow of pollutants, for example, the Big Bend Regional Aerosol and Visibility Observational study, measuring the effectiveness of ventilation and studying the possible effects of terrorist attacks (for example in New York ).

PFTs have even been used to track ransom money after a kidnapping.
