= Fowler process =

The Fowler process is an industry and laboratory route to fluorocarbons, by fluorinating hydrocarbons or their partially fluorinated derivatives in the vapor phase over cobalt(III) fluoride.

== Background ==
The Manhattan Project required the production and handling of uranium hexafluoride for uranium enrichment, whether by diffusion or centrifuge. Uranium hexafluoride is very corrosive, oxidising, volatile solid (sublimes at 56 °C). To handle this material, several new materials were required, including a coolant liquid that could survive contact with uranium hexafluoride. Perfluorocarbons were identified as ideal materials, but at that point no method was available to produce them in any significant quantity.

The problem is that fluorine gas is extremely reactive. Simply exposing a hydrocarbon to fluorine will cause the hydrocarbon to ignite. A way to moderate the reaction was required, and the method developed was to react the hydrocarbon with cobalt(III) fluoride, rather than fluorine itself.

After World War II, much of the technology that had been kept secret was released into the public domain. The March 1947 issue of Industrial and Engineering Chemistry presented a collection of articles about fluorine chemistry, starting with the generation and handling of fluorine, and going on to discuss the synthesis of organofluorides and related topics. In one of these articles Fowler et al. describe the laboratory preparation of numerous perfluorocarbons by the vapour phase reaction of a hydrocarbon with cobalt(III) fluoride, at a pilot plant scale, in particular, perfluoro-n-heptane and perfluorodimethylcyclohexane (mixture of 1,3-isomer and 1,4 isomer), and on an industrial scale by Du Pont.

== Chemistry ==
The Fowler process is typically done in two stages, the first stage being fluorination of cobalt(II) fluoride to cobalt(III) fluoride.

2 CoF_{2} + F_{2} → 2 CoF_{3}

During the second stage, in this instance to make perfluorohexane, the hydrocarbon feed is introduced and is fluorinated by the cobalt(III) fluoride, which is converted back to cobalt(II) fluoride for reuse. Both stages are performed at high temperature.

C_{6}H_{14} + 28 CoF_{3} → C_{6}F_{14} + 14 HF + 28 CoF_{2}

The reaction proceeds through a single electron transfer process, involving a carbocation. This carbocation intermediate can readily undergo rearrangements, which can lead to a complex mixture of products.

== Feedstocks ==
Typically hydrocarbon compounds are used as the feedstocks. For cyclic perfluorocarbon, the aromatic hydrocarbon is the preferred choice, so for example, toluene is the feedstock for perfluoromethylcyclohexane, rather than methylcyclohexane, as less fluorine is required. Often partially fluorinated feedstocks are used, for example, bis-1,3-(trifluoromethyl)benzene to make perfluoro-1,3-dimethylcyclohexane. Although these are considerably more expensive, they require less fluorine and more importantly, they generally give higher yields, as the carbocation rearrangements are much less likely.

== Flutec perfluorocarbons ==
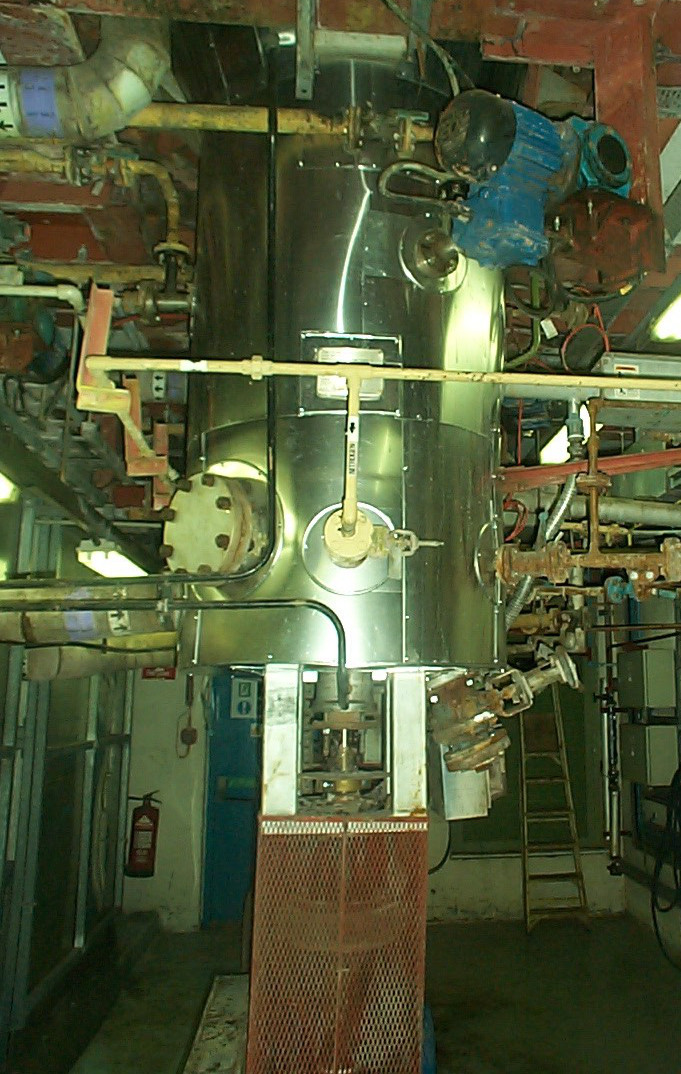
Cobalt(III) fluoride reactor at F2 Chemicals Ltd, Preston

In the UK, Imperial Chemical Industries Limited (later ICI) was also developing cobalt(III) fluoride technology during the war, prompted by the work in the US. The process was later commercialized under the tradename Flutec by the Imperial Smelting Company (later ISC Chemicals) at Avonmouth near Bristol. Physical properties were determined by a company called G.V. Planer, under a project in 1965 called the Planar Project. Products were therefore designated PP1, PP2, PP3, etc. The designation has remained to this day.

ISC Chemicals became part of RTZ in 1968, and that part of the business was transferred to Rhone-Poulenc in 1988. The Flutec business went into a decline, due to a drop in its main application, vapor phase reflow soldering (used in surface-mount technology, and six years later the Flutec business was purchased by BNFL Fluorochemicals Ltd and transferred to Preston, Lancashire, where it has been developed into several new applications. BNFL Fluorochemicals Ltd became F2 Chemicals Ltd in 1998.
