= Artificial gills =

Artificial gills may refer to:

- Imitation gills put into stuffed fish for the sake of appearance in taxidermy
- An inaccurate term for liquid breathing sets
- Artificial gills (human), which extract oxygen from water to supply a human diver
