= Fluorinert =

Electronics coolant liquid

Fluorinert is the trademarked brand name for the line of electronics coolant liquids sold commercially by 3M. As perfluorinated compounds (PFCs), all Fluorinert variants have an extremely high global warming potential (GWP), and so they should be used with caution (see below). It is an electrically insulating, stable fluorocarbon-based fluid, which is used in various cooling applications. It is mainly used for cooling electronics. Different molecular formulations are available with a variety of boiling points, allowing it to be used in "single-phase" applications, where it remains a liquid, or for "two-phase" applications, where the liquid boils to remove additional heat by evaporative cooling. An example of one of the compounds 3M uses is FC-72 (perfluorohexane, C_{6}F_{14}). Perfluorohexane is used for low-temperature heat-transfer applications due to its 56 °C (133 °F) boiling point. Another example is FC-75, perfluoro(2-butyl-tetrahydrofurane). There are 3M fluids that can handle up to 215 °C (419 °F), such as FC-70 (perfluorotripentylamine).

Fluorinert is used in situations where air cannot carry away enough heat, or where airflow is so restricted that some sort of forced pumping is required.

== Toxicity ==
Fluorinert may be harmful if inhaled, and care should be taken to avoid contact with eyes and skin. However, according to the documentation from the manufacturer, no health effects are expected from ingestion of Fluorinert. Usage of fluorinated oils should be limited to closed systems and reduced volumes, since they have a very high global-warming potential and a long atmospheric lifetime.

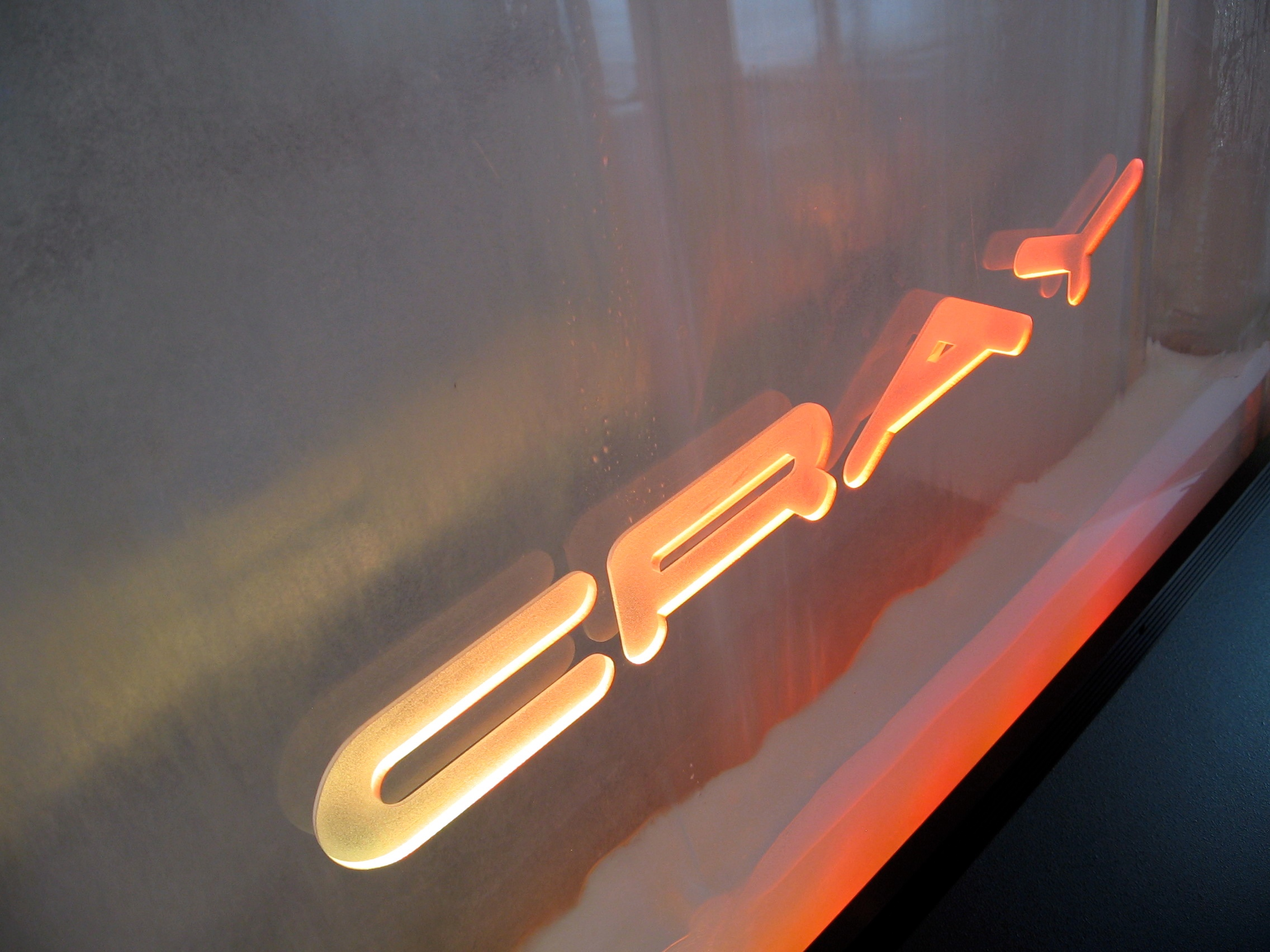
The Fluorinert-filled "fountain" of a Cray-2

Although Fluorinert was intended to be inert, the Lawrence Livermore National Laboratory discovered that the liquid cooling system of their Cray-2 supercomputers decomposed during extended service, producing some highly toxic perfluoroisobutene. Catalytic scrubbers were installed to remove this contaminant.

The science-fiction film The Abyss (1989) depicted an experimental liquid-breathing system, in which the use of highly oxygenated Fluorinert enabled a diver to descend to great depths. While several rats were shown actually breathing Fluorinert, scenes depicting actor Ed Harris using the fluid-breathing apparatus were simulated.

== Global warming potential ==
Fluorinert perfluorotributylamine absorbs infrared (IR) wavelengths readily and has a long atmospheric lifetime. As such, it has a very high global warming potential (GWP) of 7,100, and should be used in closed systems only and carefully managed to minimize emissions.

== Alternatives ==
Due to Fluorinert's high global warming potential, alternative low global warming potential agents were found and sold under the brand names Novec Engineered Fluids. There are two types of chemical compounds under Novec branding for similar industrial applications:

- Segregated Hydrofluoroether (HFE) compounds including Novec 7000, 7100, 7200, 7300, 7500, and 7700 has lower global warming potential of ~300.
- Fluoroketones (FK) compounds including Novec 649 and 774 has much lower global warming potential of 1. Novec 649 has similar thermo-physical properties to FC-72 making it a good drop-in replacement for low temperature heat transfer.

== See also ==
- Immersion cooling
- Liquid dielectric
- Novec 649/1230
- Hydrofluoroether
