= Hydrofluoroether =

Class of organic solvent

Hydrofluoroethers (HFEs) are a class of organic solvents. As non-ozone-depleting chemicals, they were developed originally as a replacement for CFCs, HFCs, HCFCs, and PFCs. They are typically colorless, odorless, tasteless, low toxicity, low viscosity, and liquid at room temperature. The boiling point of HFEs vary from 50 °C (122 °F) to nearly 100 °C (212 °F). Although 3M first developed HFEs, other manufacturers have begun producing them. They are chemically related to the fluorinated ether inhalational anaesthetics sevoflurane and desflurane.

== Applications ==
Industrial uses are many and varied, including:

- Vapor de-greasing solvent
- Refrigerant and heat-transfer fluid
- Anhydrous fluid cleaner

They are sometimes applied as blends such as HFE 7100, which is a mixture of methyl nonafluorobutyl ether (methoxyperfluorobutane) and methyl nonafluoroisobutyl ether.

3M produces hydrofluoroether compounds under the names Novec 7000, 7100, 7200, 7300, 7500, and 7700 as liquid coolants for many applications, including full immersion cooling of computer electronics.

== Environmental impact ==
Because of their high molecular weights, HFEs remain in the atmosphere for less than two weeks, being absorbed into the ground rather than remaining dissolved in the atmosphere. Although HFEs are greenhouse gases, the EPA does not regulate their use due to the short atmospheric lifetimes and zero ozone depletion potential compared to alternative chemicals.

== See also ==
- Immersion cooling
- Liquid dielectric
- Novec 649 and 774
- Fluorinert
