= Perfluorotributylamine =

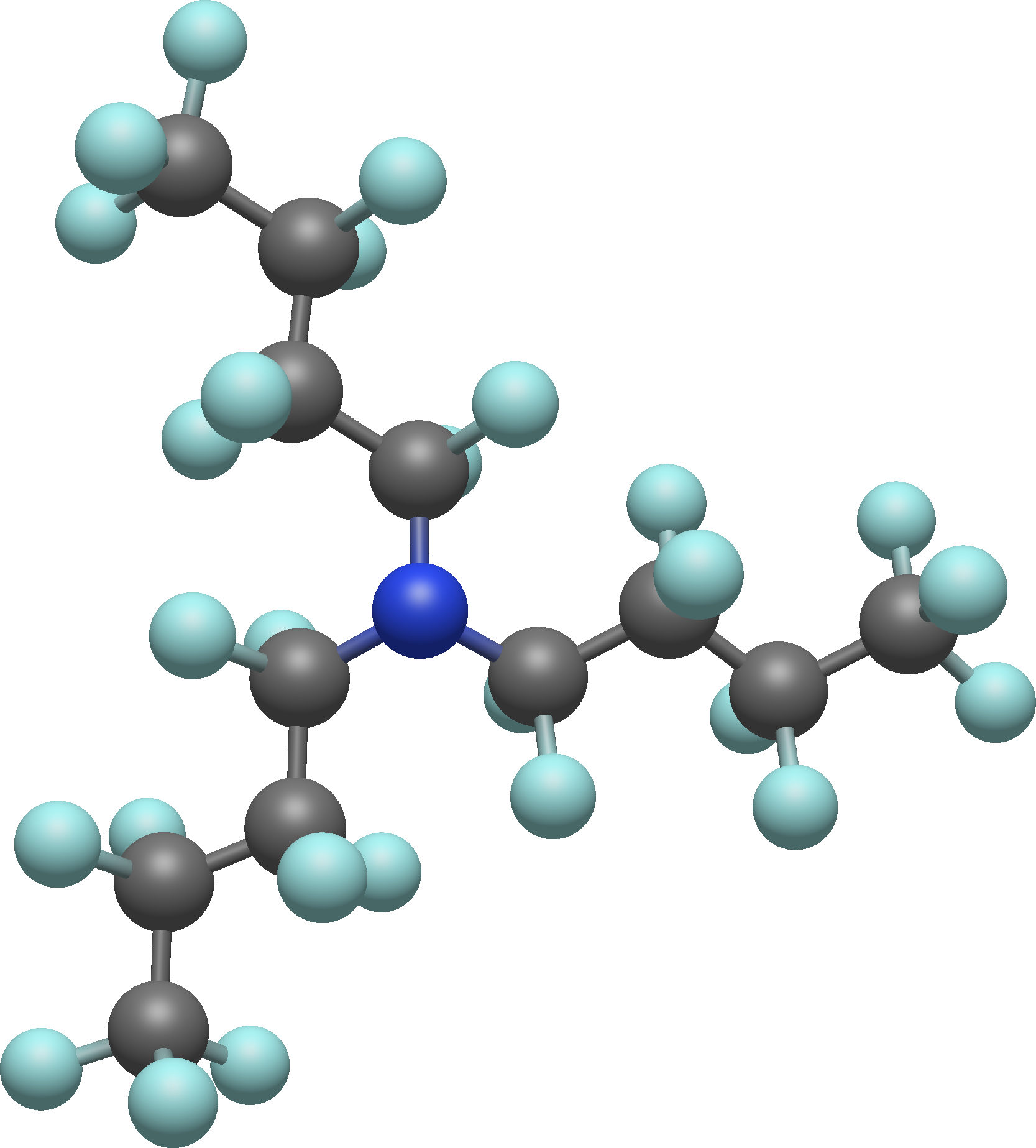

Names
- Preferred IUPAC name 1,1,2,2,3,3,4,4,4-Nonafluoro-N,N-bis(nonafluorobutyl)butan-1-amine
- Other names Fluorinert; Fluosol FC 43

Identifiers
CAS Number	311-89-7
3D model (JSmol)	Interactive image
Abbreviations	PFTBA
ChEBI	CHEBI:38854
ChemSpider	13836523
ECHA InfoCard	100.005.659
PubChem CID	9397
UNII	3702Y1HQ6O
CompTox Dashboard (EPA)	DTXSID0027141
- InChI: InChI=1S/C12F27N/c13-1(14,7(25,26)27)4(19,20)10(34,35)40(11(36,37)5(21,22)2(15,16)8(28,29)30)12(38,39)6(23,24)3(17,18)9(31,32)33 Key: RVZRBWKZFJCCIB-UHFFFAOYSA-N; InChI=1/C12F27N/c13-1(14,7(25,26)27)4(19,20)10(34,35)40(11(36,37)5(21,22)2(15,16)8(28,29)30)12(38,39)6(23,24)3(17,18)9(31,32)33 Key: RVZRBWKZFJCCIB-UHFFFAOYAW
- SMILES: C(C(C(F)(F)F)(F)F)(C(N(C(C(C(C(F)(F)F)(F)F)(F)F)(F)F)C(C(C(C(F)(F)F)(F)F)(F)F)(F)F)(F)F)(F)F

Properties
Chemical formula	N(CF_{2}CF_{2}CF_{2}CF_{3})_{3}
Molar mass	671.096 g·mol^{−1}
Appearance	colorless liquid
Density	1.884 g/mL
Melting point	−50 °C (−58 °F; 223 K)
Boiling point	178 °C (352 °F; 451 K)
Solubility in water	Insoluble
Solubility in methanol and isopropyl alcohol	Insoluble
- Except where otherwise noted, data are given for materials in their standard state (at 25 °C [77 °F], 100 kPa). Infobox references

Perfluorotributylamine (PFTBA), also referred to as FC43, is an organic compound with the chemical formula N(CF_{2}CF_{2}CF_{2}CF_{3})_{3}. It is a colorless liquid. A molecule of this chemical compound consists of three butyl groups connected to one nitrogen atom, in which all of the hydrogen atoms are replaced with fluorine atoms. The compound is produced for the electronics industry, along with other perfluoroalkylamines. The high degree of fluorination significantly reduces the basicity of the central amine due to electron-withdrawing effects.

== Preparation ==
It is prepared by electrofluorination of tributylamine using hydrogen fluoride as solvent and source of fluorine:

N(CH_{2}CH_{2}CH_{2}CH_{3})_{3} + 27 HF → N(CF_{2}CF_{2}CF_{2}CF_{3})_{3} + 27 H_{2}

== Uses ==
The compound has two commercial uses. It is used as an ingredient in Fluosol, artificial blood. This application exploits the high solubility of oxygen and carbon dioxide in the solvent, as well as the low viscosity and toxicity. It is also a component of Fluorinert coolant liquids. CPUs of some computers are immersed in this liquid to facilitate cooling.

=== Niche ===
The compound is used as a calibrant in gas chromatography when the analytical technique uses mass spectrometry as a detector to identify and quantify chemical compounds in gases or liquids. When undergoing ionization in the mass spectrometer, the compound decomposes in a repeatable pattern to form fragments of specific masses, which can be used to tune the mass response and accuracy of the mass spectrometer. Most commonly used ions are those with approximate mass of 69, 131, 219, 414 and 502 daltons.

== Safety ==
Fluorofluids are generally of very low toxicity, so much that they have been evaluated as synthetic blood.

== Environmental impact ==
It is a greenhouse gas with warming properties more than 7,000 times that of carbon dioxide over a 100-year period, and, as such, is one of the most potent greenhouse gases ever discovered. Its concentration in the atmosphere is approximately 0.18 parts per trillion. The compound can persist in the atmosphere for up to 500 years. There has been speculation that it may be helpful in the terraforming of Mars.

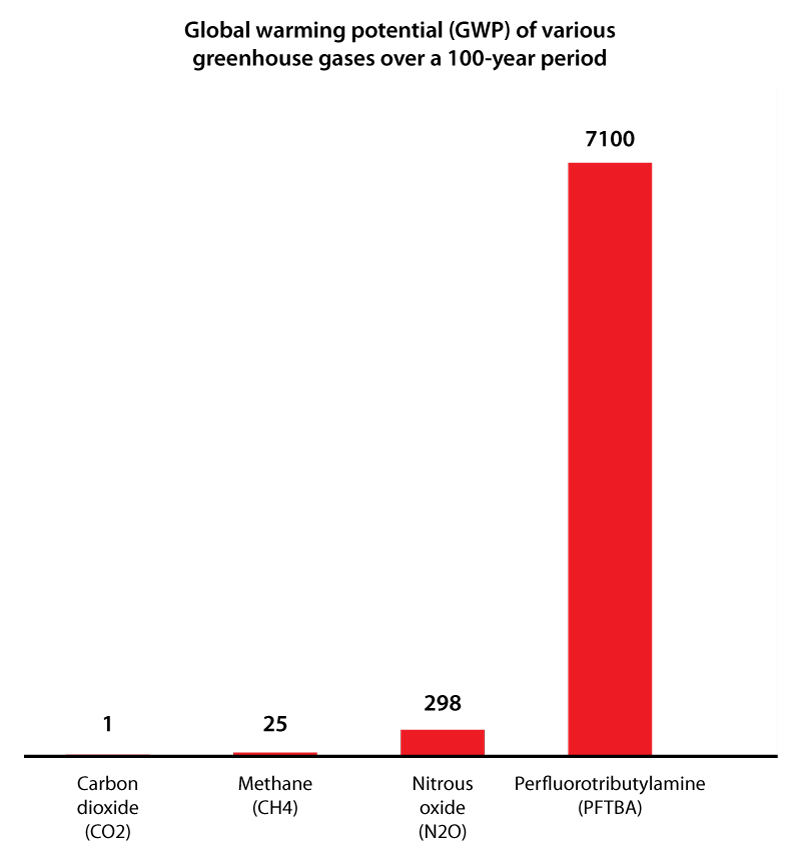
Global warming potential of greenhouse gases and PFTBA

== See also ==
- Perfluorotripentylamine
