= Liquid ventilator =

Medical device

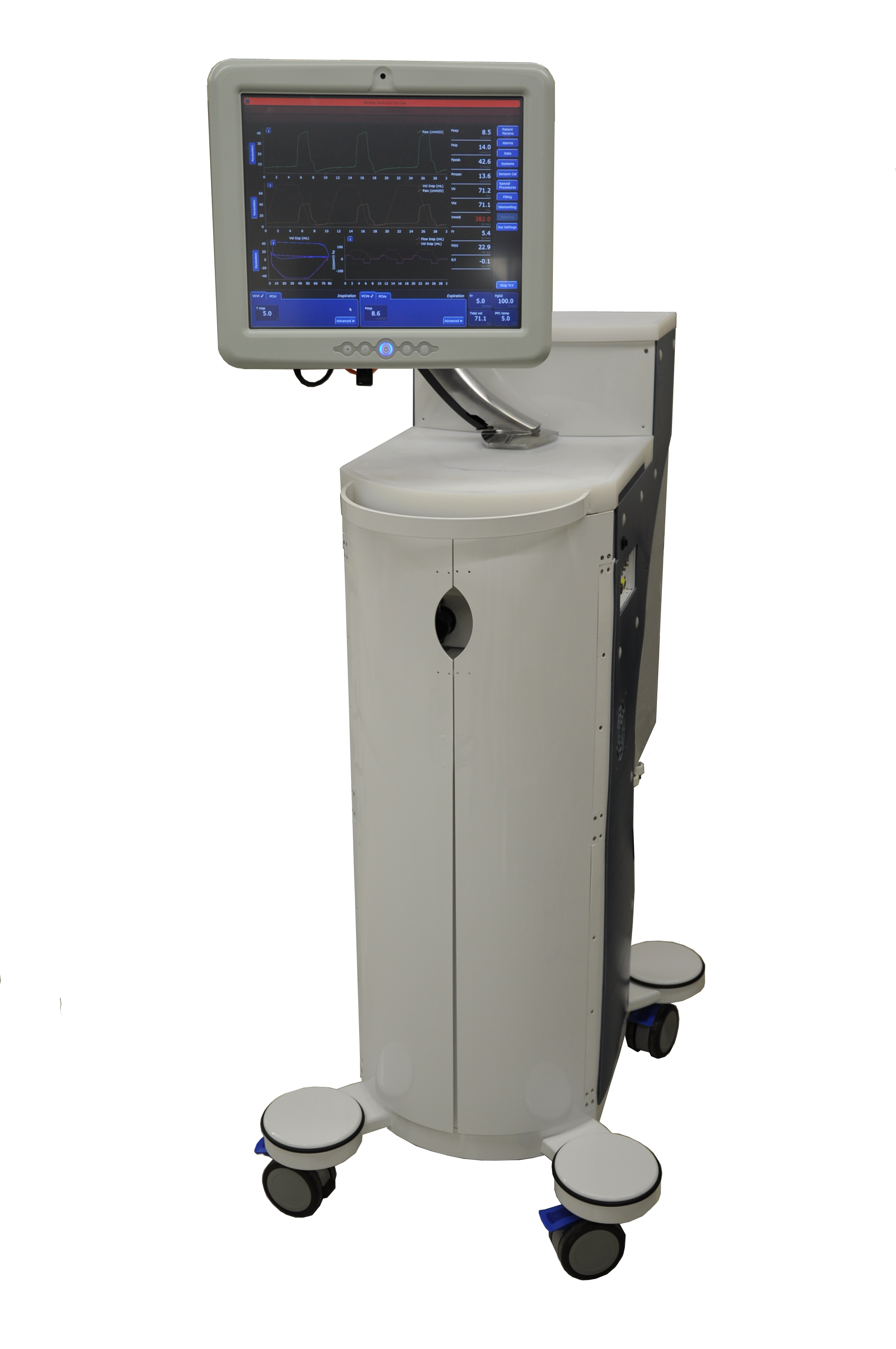
Example of a liquid ventilator (Inolivent-5 research group Inolivent, Université de Sherbrooke)

A liquid ventilator is similar to a medical ventilator except that it should be able to ensure reliable total liquid ventilation with a breatheable liquid (a perfluorocarbon). Liquid ventilators are prototypes that may have been used for animal experimentations but experts recommend continued development of a liquid ventilator toward clinical applications.

== Function and technology ==
=== Driving liquid ===
In total liquid ventilation (TLV), the lungs are completely filled with a perfluorocarbon (PFC) liquid while the liquid ventilator renews the tidal volume of PFC. The liquid ventilator operates in mandatory mode: it must force the PFC in and out of the lungs with a pumping system.

- During the inspiratory phase, the pump generates a positive driving pressure in the trachea to ensure the PFC insertion of the tidal volume.
- During the expiratory phase, the pump generates a negative driving pressure in the trachea to ensure PFC withdrawal of the tidal volume.

The pumping system is either a peristaltic pump (in the simplest liquid ventilators) or two piston pumps (in the most advanced liquid ventilators).

Because of the PFC viscosity, the head loss in the airways requires a low negative driving pressure during the expiration phase that can collapse the airways. This is the choked flow phenomenon in TLV which compromises the minute ventilation and consequently the gas exchanges. To address this limitation, liquid ventilator integrates a control of the pumping system.

=== Controlling liquid ventilator ===
The introduction of computers in liquid ventilators to control the pumping system provides different control modes, monitoring and valuable data for decision making.

The liquid ventilator is always volume-controlled because the specified tidal volume of PFC must be accurately delivered and retrieved. It is also pressure-limited because it must stop the expiratory or inspiratory phase when a too low, or a too large, driving pressure is detected.

However, during the expiratory phase, the expiratory flow can be commanded by an open-loop controller or a closed-loop controller:

- when the expiratory flow is open-loop controlled, it is fast initially and slowing down progressively after to minimize the risk of collapse generation.
- when the expiratory flow is closed-loop controlled, it is commanded in real-time to maintain a specified driving pressure. This is a pressure-regulated mode. Such approach automatically avoids collapse generation.

Also, during the inspiratory phase, the volume-controlled mode is realized by open-loop or closed loop control of the PFC flow.

=== Oxygenating and heating liquid ===
The liquid ventilator removes Carbon dioxide (CO_{2}) from the PFC by saturating it with oxygen (O_{2}) and medical air. This procedure can be performed with either a membrane oxygenator (a technology used in extracorporeal oxygenators) or a bubble oxygenator.

The liquid ventilator heats the PFC to body temperature. This is performed with a heat exchanger connected to the oxygenator or with dedicated heaters integrated in the oxygenator.

The oxygenator and the heater produce PFC vapor which is recuperated with a condenser in order to limit the evaporation loss (the PFC is a greenhouse gas).

== Example ==
Example of the pumping cycle in a liquid ventilator (Inolivent-4, research group Inolivent, Université de Sherbrooke)

An example of a liquid ventilator is the Inolivent-4. It is composed of two independent piston pumps and integrated unit allowing for oxygenation of PFC, temperature control, and recovery of evaporated PFC. This liquid ventilator also includes volume and pressure control strategies to optimize the ventilatory cycle: it performs a pressure-regulated volume-controlled ventilation mode. It is designed for experimental research on animal models weighing between 0.5 kg to 9 kg.

A typical cycle is composed of four steps :

1. Inspiratory pump inserts a volume of PFC in the lungs (valve 1 open, valve 2 closed), and the expiratory pump pushes PFC in the oxygenator via the filter (valve 3 closed, valve 4 open).
2. During the inspiratory pause (all valves are closed), the lung volume is at its maximal value. The measured pressure is the Positive End-Inspiratory Pressure (PEIP).
3. Expiratory pump retrieves a volume of PFC in the lungs (valve 3 open, valve 4 closed), and the inspiratory pump draws PFC from the reservoir (valve 1 closed, valve 2 open).
4. During the expiratory pause (all valves are closed), the lung volume is at its minimal value. The measured pressure is the Positive End-expiratory Pressure (PEEP).

== Potential applications ==
Studies have shown both the efficacy and safety of liquid ventilation in normal, mature and immature newborn lungs. Overall, liquid ventilation improves gas exchange and lung compliance and prevents the lungs against ventilation-induced lung injury.

=== Respiratory support ===
Studies suggest clear benefits of liquid ventilation in acute respiratory distress syndrome (ARDS). For example, total liquid ventilation could be used for newborns with severe neonatal respiratory distress syndrome in which conventional treatment has failed. Typical cases are late preterm newborns who have an increased risk of intracranial hemorrhage and for whom their small vessel size poses technical limitations for Extracorporeal membrane oxygenation (ECMO).

=== Therapeutic lung lavage ===
Liquid ventilator can perform therapeutic lung lavage, the washout of endogenous and exogenous debris from the lungs, without suspension of ventilation support (without apnea). For example, literature data suggest a radical change in the treatment of meconium aspiration syndrome (MAS) by considering the use of a liquid ventilator. The demonstration of its efficacy was performed in the neonatal lamb..

=== Therapeutic hypothermia with rapid cooling ===
The liquid ventilator with advanced control temperature of PFC allows the rapid cooling of the body. Consequently, therapeutic hypothermia is an expected clinical application. For example, studies present that rapid cooling instituted by TLV can improve cardiac and mitochondrial function or can induce favorable neurological and cardiac outcomes after cardiac arrest in rabbits.

== See also ==
- Mechanical ventilation
