= Perfluorohexane =

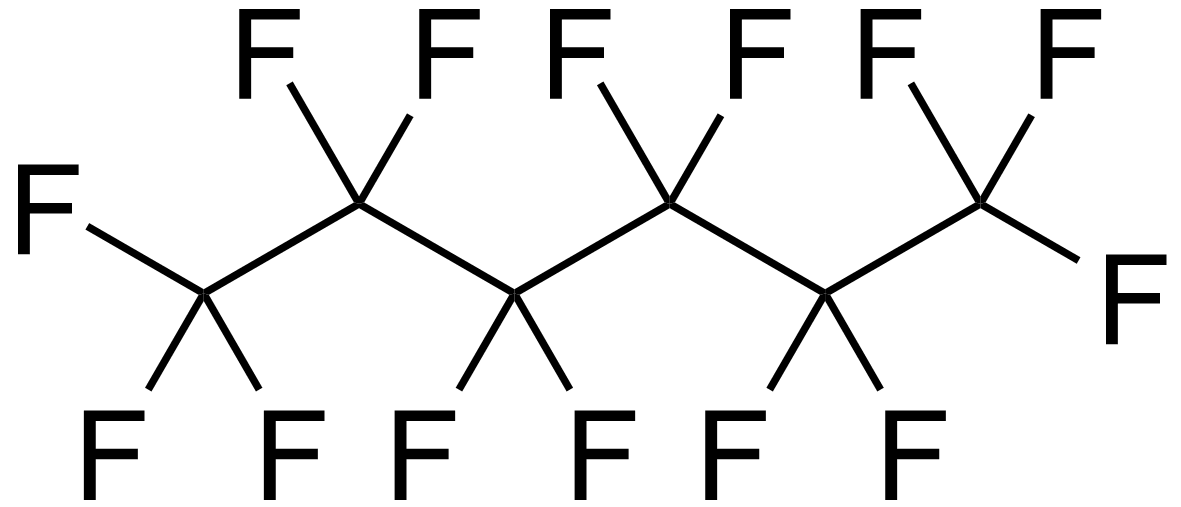

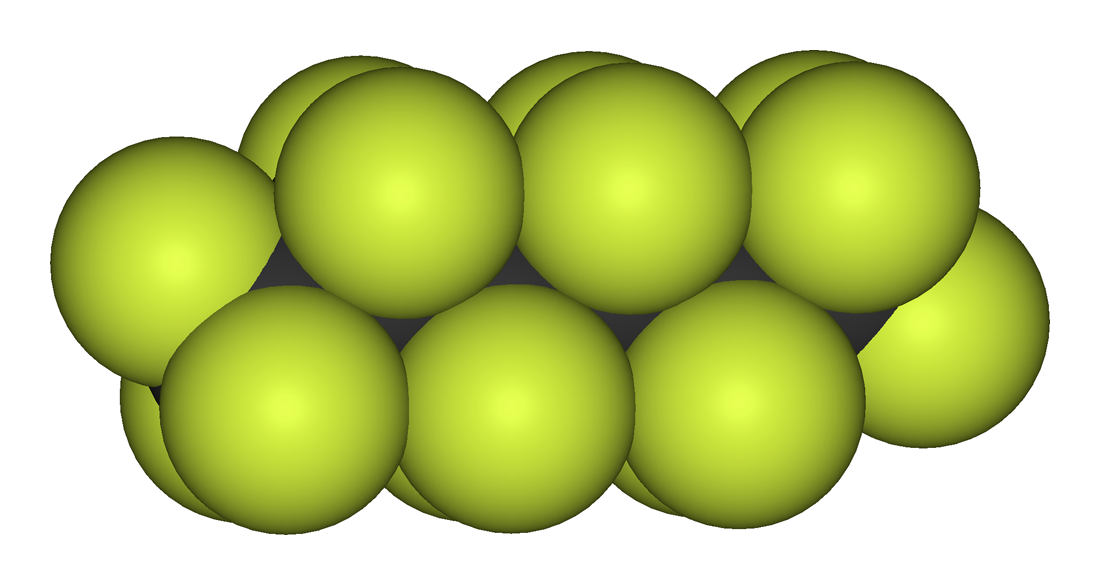

Names
- Preferred IUPAC name Tetradecafluorohexane
- Other names FC-72, Fluorinert FC-72, Flutec PP1, Perfluoro-compound FC-72

Identifiers
CAS Number	355-42-0
3D model (JSmol)	Interactive image
Abbreviations	PFH
ChEBI	CHEBI:39427
ChemSpider	9262
ECHA InfoCard	100.005.987
KEGG	D05437
PubChem CID	9639
UNII	FX3WJ41CMX
CompTox Dashboard (EPA)	DTXSID7046548
- InChI: InChI=1S/C6F14/c7-1(8,3(11,12)5(15,16)17)2(9,10)4(13,14)6(18,19)20 Key: ZJIJAJXFLBMLCK-UHFFFAOYSA-N; InChI=1/C6F14/c7-1(8,3(11,12)5(15,16)17)2(9,10)4(13,14)6(18,19)20 Key: ZJIJAJXFLBMLCK-UHFFFAOYAE
- SMILES: FC(F)(C(F)(F)C(F)(F)F)C(F)(F)C(F)(F)C(F)(F)F

Properties
Chemical formula	C_{6}F_{14}
Molar mass	338.041845
Appearance	Clear, colorless
Odor	Odorless
Density	1.680 kg/m^{3} (Liquid)
Melting point	−90 °C (−130 °F; 183 K)
Boiling point	56 °C (133 °F; 329 K)
Vapor pressure	30.9 kPa (25 °C)
Thermal conductivity	0.057 W/(m·K)
Viscosity	0.64 cP

Hazards
NFPA 704 (fire diamond)	0 0 0
- Lethal dose or concentration (LD, LC)
LD_{50} (median dose)	> 5 g/kg (rat, oral)
- Except where otherwise noted, data are given for materials in their standard state (at 25 °C [77 °F], 100 kPa). verify (what is ?) Infobox references

Perfluorohexane (C_{6}F_{14}), or tetradecafluorohexane, is a fluorocarbon. It is a derivative of hexane in which all the hydrogen atoms are replaced by fluorine atoms. It is used in one formulation of the electronic cooling liquid/insulator Fluorinert for low-temperature applications due to its low boiling point of 56 °C and freezing point of −90 °C. It is odorless and colorless. Unlike typical hydrocarbons, the structure features a helical carbon backbone. In medical imaging it is used as a contrast agent.

== Oxygen solubility ==
Because it is biologically inert and chemically stable, perfluorohexane has attracted attention in medicine. Like other fluorocarbons, perfluorohexane dissolves gases, including oxygen from the air, to a higher concentration than ordinary organic solvents. This effect is attributed to the weak intermolecular forces between perfluorohexane molecules, which allows "space" for gas molecules to partition into the liquid. Animals can be submerged in a bath of oxygenated perfluorohexane without drowning, as there is sufficient oxygen available in the solvent to allow respiration to continue. This effect has led to the experimental use of perfluorohexane in treating burn victims, as their lungs can be filled with either perfluorohexane vapor or in extreme cases liquid perfluorohexane, allowing breathing to continue without the problems normally seen with pulmonary edema that sometimes occur when the inside of the lungs have been burnt e.g. by inhalation of hot smoke. Research was particularly active on the topic of partial liquid ventilation (PLV) in the 1990s and early 2000s, however, perfluorohexane and other perfluorocarbons showed no significant improvement of patient outcomes in clinical trials.

== Alternatives ==
Perfluorohexane has extremely high global warming potential (GWP) of 9,300. This leads to a need to find low GWP alternative. Novec 649 was considered a good drop-in replacement in many applications due to its similar thermo-physical properties and having a global warming potential of 1.

== See also ==
- 1-fluorohexane
- Novec 649/1230
- Fluorinert
- Liquid dielectric
