= Ethyl isopropyl ketone =

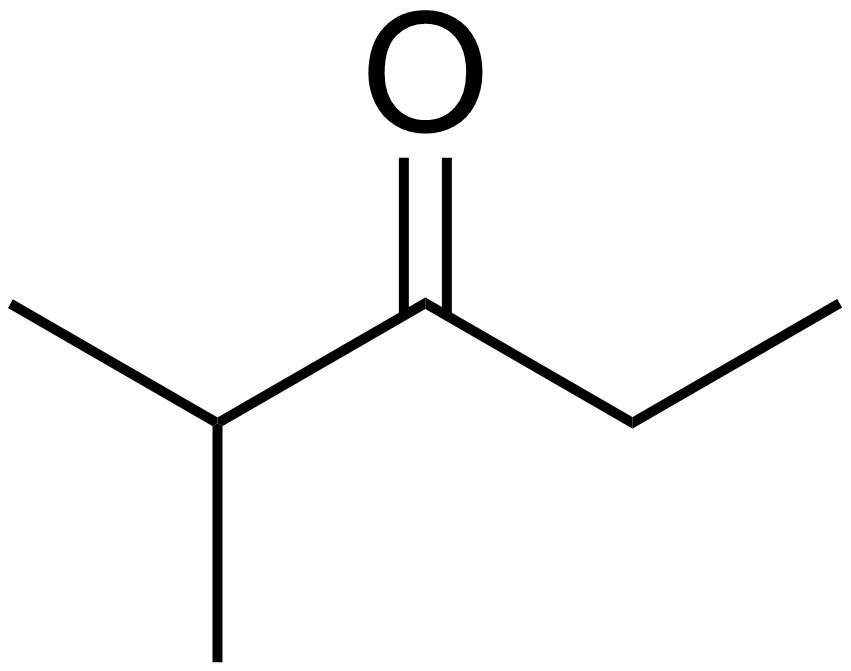
- Ethyl isopropyl ketone

Names
- Preferred IUPAC name 2-Methylpentan-3-one
- Other names Ethyl isopropyl ketone

Identifiers
CAS Number	565-69-5
3D model (JSmol)	Interactive image; Interactive image
ChemSpider	10791
ECHA InfoCard	100.008.445
PubChem CID	11265
UNII	0R392X5X26
CompTox Dashboard (EPA)	DTXSID2073196
- InChI: InChI=1S/C6H12O/c1-4-6(7)5(2)3/h5H,4H2,1-3H3 Key: HYTRYEXINDDXJK-UHFFFAOYSA-N; InChI=1/C6H12O/c1-4-6(7)5(2)3/h5H,4H2,1-3H3 Key: HYTRYEXINDDXJK-UHFFFAOYAO
- SMILES: CC(C)C(=O)CC; O=C(CC)C(C)C

Properties
Chemical formula	C_{6}H_{12}O
Molar mass	100.161 g·mol^{−1}
Density	0.811 g/cm^{3}
Melting point	< 25 °C (77 °F; 298 K)
Boiling point	113 °C (235 °F; 386 K)
Solubility in water	15.5 mg/mL
- Except where otherwise noted, data are given for materials in their standard state (at 25 °C [77 °F], 100 kPa). verify (what is ?) Infobox references

Ethyl isopropyl ketone (2-methyl-pentan-3-one) is an aliphatic ketone with used as a reagent in organic chemistry and as a solvent.

Its fully fluorinated analog is known as perfluoro(2-methyl-3-pentanone), and is notably used in gaseous fire suppression under the name Novec 1230.
