= Perfluoro(2-methyl-3-pentanone) =

Chemical compound

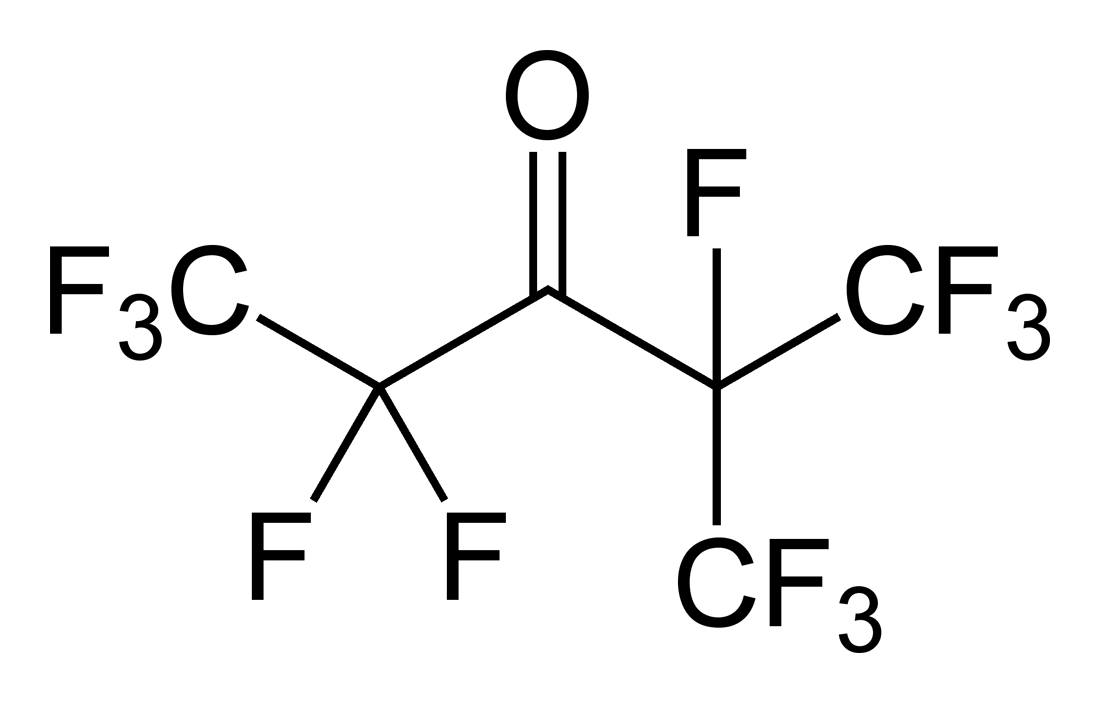

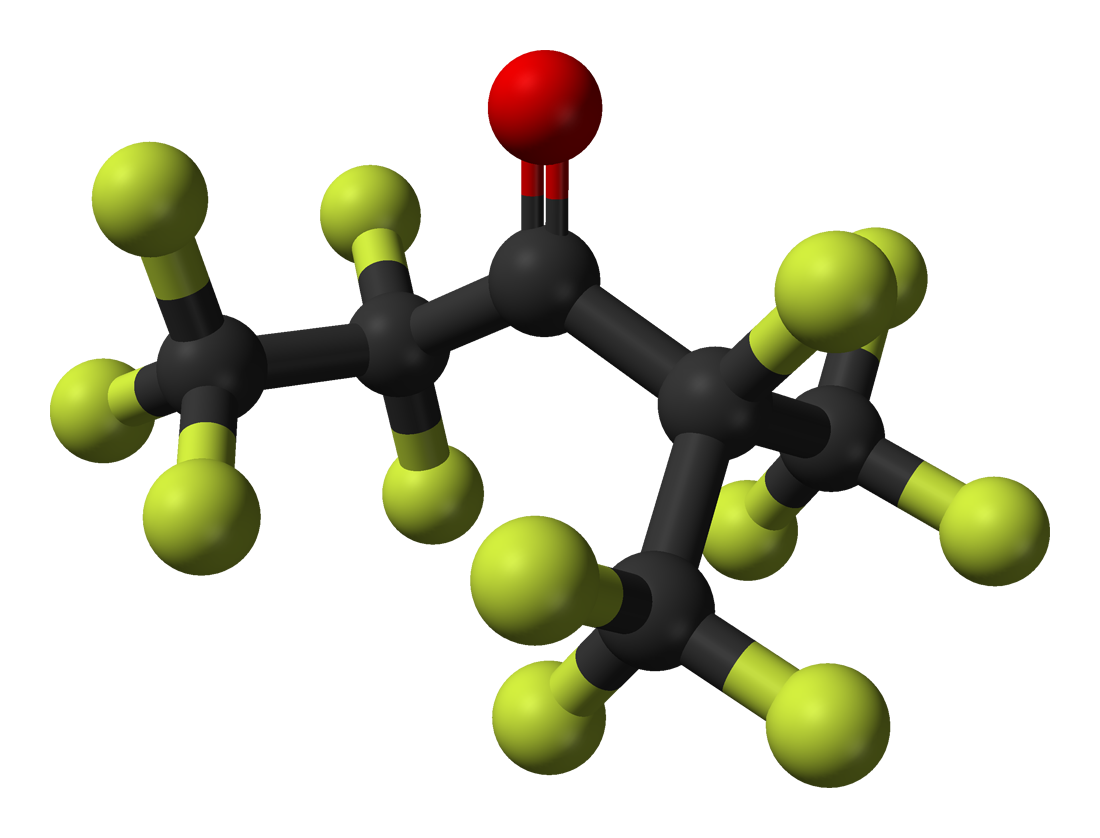

Names
- Preferred IUPAC name 1,1,1,2,2,4,5,5,5-Nonafluoro-4-(trifluoromethyl)pentan-3-one
- Other names FK-5-1-12 (ISO name), C6K, perfluoro(2-methyl-3-pentanone), heptafluoroisopropyl pentafluoroethyl ketone, waterless water, dry water

Identifiers
CAS Number	756-13-8
3D model (JSmol)	Interactive image
Abbreviations	FK
ChemSpider	2062563
ECHA InfoCard	100.103.448
PubChem CID	2782408
CompTox Dashboard (EPA)	DTXSID4074932
- InChI: InChI=1S/C6F12O/c7-2(4(10,11)12,5(13,14)15)1(19)3(8,9)6(16,17)18 Key: RMLFHPWPTXWZNJ-UHFFFAOYSA-N
- SMILES: FC(F)(F)C(F)(C(=O)C(F)(F)C(F)(F)F)C(F)(F)F

Properties
Chemical formula	C_{6}F_{12}O
Molar mass	316.046 g·mol^{−1}
Appearance	Clear, colorless liquid
Odor	Near odorless
Density	1,610 kg/m^{3}
Melting point	−108 °C (−162 °F; 165 K)
Boiling point	49 °C (120 °F; 322 K)
Vapor pressure	40.4 kPa @ 25 °C
Thermal conductivity	0.059 W/m-K
Viscosity	0.64 cP
- Except where otherwise noted, data are given for materials in their standard state (at 25 °C [77 °F], 100 kPa). verify (what is ?) Infobox references

Perfluoro(2-methyl-3-pentanone) is a fluorinated ketone with the structural formula CF_{3}CF_{2}C(=O)CF(CF_{3})_{2}, a fully-fluorinated analog of ethyl isopropyl ketone. It is used as an electronics coolant liquid and fire protection fluid sold commercially by 3M under brand names such as Novec 1230, Novec 649, and FK-5-1-12. It is also known as "waterless water" or "dry water".

== Applications ==
3M produces perfluoro(2-methyl-3-pentanone) under different brand names of Novec 1230 and Novec 649. These two products have different purity grades (>99% and >99.9%, respectively) intended for different industrial applications.

=== Novec 1230 and FK-5-1-12 ===
Novec 1230 is used as gaseous fire suppression agent in scenarios where water-based fire suppression (for example, from a fire sprinkler) would be impractical or where it could damage expensive equipment or property, such as museums, server rooms, banks, clean rooms and hospitals. It functions by rapidly removing heat to extinguish a fire before it starts; also, its density enables it to displace air and thereby deprive the fire of oxygen. Novec 1230 can be used in both total/partial/localized flooding systems, and directional spray-type applications; it is also used in portable extinguishers for specialized applications. The Patent for Novec 1230 as fire extinguishant ended on July 19, 2020. Since the expiry of the patent, multiple companies have brought equivalent products to market under the chemical name FK-5-1-12.

Recently, it has found active use in microencapsulated form in the manufacture of fire-extinguishing composite materials. Samsung SDI is using this product to extinguish fires in the early stages of modular high-capacity storage systems (ESS) based on lithium-ion batteries for solar panels and electric vehicles. In August 2019, Samsung SDI officially announced its investment of $169 million into fire-extinguishing composite materials based on microencapsulated Novec 1230. The firm later reported that UL9540A testing for this product was passed.

=== Novec 649 ===
Novec 649 is a low-temperature heat-transfer fluid. It has been used as a full-immersion fluid in a proof of concept data center cooling system by Intel and SGI. Due to its relatively low 49 °C (120.2 °F) boiling point, it is used as a heat transfer fluid in two-phase immersion cooling systems. Within these systems evaporative cooling is utilized to remove excess heat generated from immersed technology. The heat is then removed from the vaporous Novec 649 using a condensing loop typically running cold water. Novec 649 is also being considered to be used for cooling silicon photomultiplier (SiPM) sensors to −40 °C (−40 °F) in single-phase configuration as part of Large Hadron Collider’s high luminosity upgrade.

Traditional perfluorocarbon (PFC) based compounds used for cooling, such as Fluorinert, display high global warming potentials (GWPs), typically 5,000 to 10,000 times that of CO_{2}. Novec 649 was chosen as a good drop-in replacement due to it having similar thermo-physical properties to Fluorinert FC-72 (perfluorohexane, C6F14) while exhibiting a very low global warming potential of 1.

== Environmental safety ==
Novec 649/1230 does not deplete ozone (ODP 0) and has a global warming potential of 1 (over 100 years), equivalent to that of carbon dioxide. The Globally Harmonized System of Classification and Labeling of Chemicals (GHS) classifies this chemical as H412 - Harmful to aquatic life with long lasting effects. Photolysis in sunlight, hydrolysis and hydration may be a significant sink of Novec 649/1230 in the environment. It has very short estimated atmospheric lifetime of around 4 to 15 days.

Novec 649/1230 is classified as a PFAS substance. In December 2022, 3M announced that it would cease production of all PFAS products by 2025, including Novec 649/1230. It degrades to Trifluoroacetic acid (TFA) via photolytic degradation in sunlight.

== See also ==
- Fire protection fluid
- Immersion cooling
- Liquid dielectric
- Hydrofluoroether
- Fluorinert
