= Fire protection fluid =

Water-like fluid to suppress fires

Fire protection fluid is a fluid that acts like water, looks like water, and flows like water, but does not get things wet in the same way as water. When discharged from an apparatus, it converts to a gas, due to its thermodynamic properties and suppresses fire when used at its extinguishing concentration to remove heat. It is often used to extinguish fires as part of automatic fire suppression systems, especially in facilities housing electronic equipment and will not damage electronics in the way that water will.

Invented by 3M, the product was introduced as Novec 1230 Fire Protection Fluid in 2004.. It is a PFAS 'forever chemical'. In December 2022, 3M announced that it would cease production of all PFAS products by 2025, including Novec 649/1230. In 2025, the same engineers that patented the legacy 1230 announced the release of SF 1230 Fire Protection Fluid from Standard Fluids Corporation.
