= Perflubron =

Chemical compound

Clinical data
- ATC code: V08CX01 (WHO)

Identifiers
- IUPAC name: 1-Bromo-1,1,2,2,3,3,4,4,5,5,6,6,7,7,8,8,8-heptadecafluorooctane
- CAS Number: 423-55-2
- PubChem CID: 9873
- ChemSpider: 9489
- UNII: Q1D0Q7R4D9
- ChEMBL: ChEMBL1200866
- CompTox Dashboard (EPA): DTXSID5046560
- ECHA InfoCard: 100.006.391

Chemical and physical data
- Formula: C_{8}BrF_{17}
- Molar mass: 498.965 g·mol^{−1}
- 3D model (JSmol): Interactive image
- Density: 1.93 g/cm^{3}
- Melting point: 6 °C (43 °F)
- Boiling point: 142 °C (288 °F)
- SMILES: FC(F)(C(F)(F)C(Br)(F)F)C(F)(F)C(F)(F)C(F)(F)C(F)(F)C(F)(F)F
- InChI: InChI=1S/C8BrF17/c9-7(22,23)5(18,19)3(14,15)1(10,11)2(12,13)4(16,17)6(20,21)8(24,25)26; Key:WTWWXOGTJWMJHI-UHFFFAOYSA-N

Perflubron (INN/USAN, or perfluorooctylbromide; brand name Imagent) is a contrast medium for magnetic resonance imaging, computer tomography and sonography. It was approved for this use in the United States by the Food and Drug Administration in 1993.

== Experimental research ==
Perflubron has also been tested experimentally for use in liquid breathing in premature infants with respiratory distress.

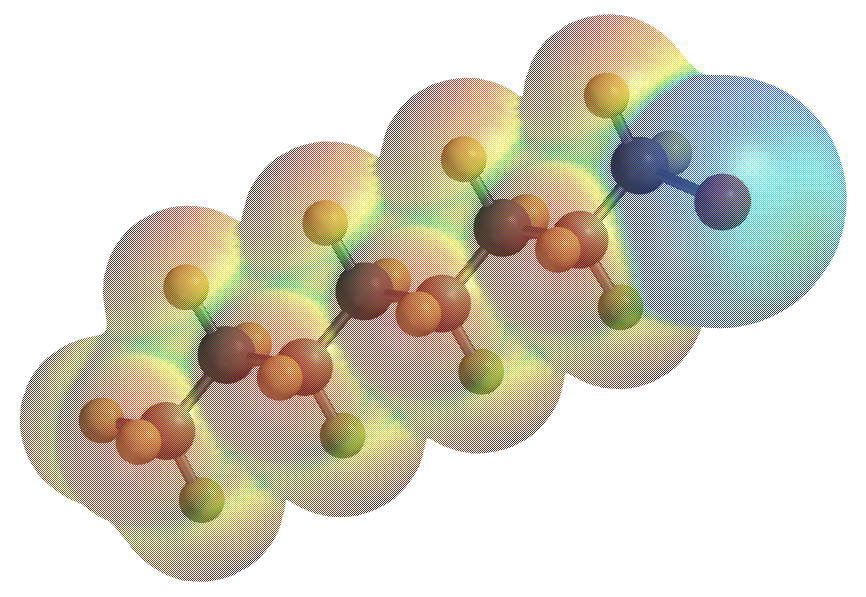
This molecular model of Perflubron is color-coded by electron density to illustrate the positive polarisation of the large bromine atom by the inductively electron-withdrawing perfluorooctyl chain.
