= FC-75 =

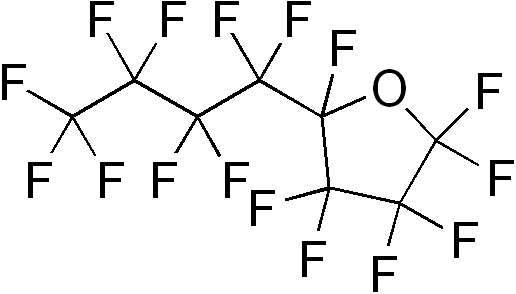

Names
- IUPAC name 2,2,3,3,4,4,5-heptafluoro-5-(1,1,2,2,3,3,4,4,4-nonafluorobutyl)tetrahydrofuran
- Other names Perfluorocyclic ether, Fluorinert FC-75, Perfluoro-compound FC-75, Perfluoro-2-n-butyl THF, Perfluoro(butyltetrahydrofuran)

Identifiers
CAS Number	335-36-4
3D model (JSmol)	Interactive image
Abbreviations	PFBTHF
Beilstein Reference	341263
ChEBI	CHEBI:39023
ChemSpider	71309
ECHA InfoCard	100.005.809
EC Number	206-389-5
PubChem CID	78976
UNII	MSL8VN7XHA
CompTox Dashboard (EPA)	DTXSID60871632
- InChI: InChI=1S/C8F16O/c9-1(10,4(15,16)7(20,21)22)2(11,12)6(19)3(13,14)5(17,18)8(23,24)25-6 Key: FYJQJMIEZVMYSD-UHFFFAOYSA-N
- SMILES: C1(C(C(OC1(C(C(C(C(F)(F)F)(F)F)(F)F)(F)F)F)(F)F)(F)F)(F)F

Properties
Chemical formula	C_{8}F_{16}O
Molar mass	416.06
Melting point	−88 °C (−126 °F; 185 K)
Boiling point	102 °C (216 °F; 375 K)
Solubility in water	Insoluble
- Except where otherwise noted, data are given for materials in their standard state (at 25 °C [77 °F], 100 kPa). verify (what is ?) Infobox references

FC-75 is a fluorocarbon derivative of tetrahydrofuran with the chemical formula C_{8}F_{16}O. It is practically insoluble in water.

It is one of the 3M Fluorinert fluids. It is used as an inert coolant fluid in electronics and other applications, and as a solvent. FC-75 can be synthesized by the same electrochemical fluorination process used to produce PFOA. However, other perfluorinated ether isomers will also result.

H(CH_{2})_{7}COCl + HF → H(CH_{2})_{7}COF + C_{7}H_{16} + 2C_{8}F_{16}O + HCl + H_{2}

A similar fluorocarbon-based coolant and solvent is perfluorohexane.
