= SensorMedics high-frequency oscillatory ventilator =

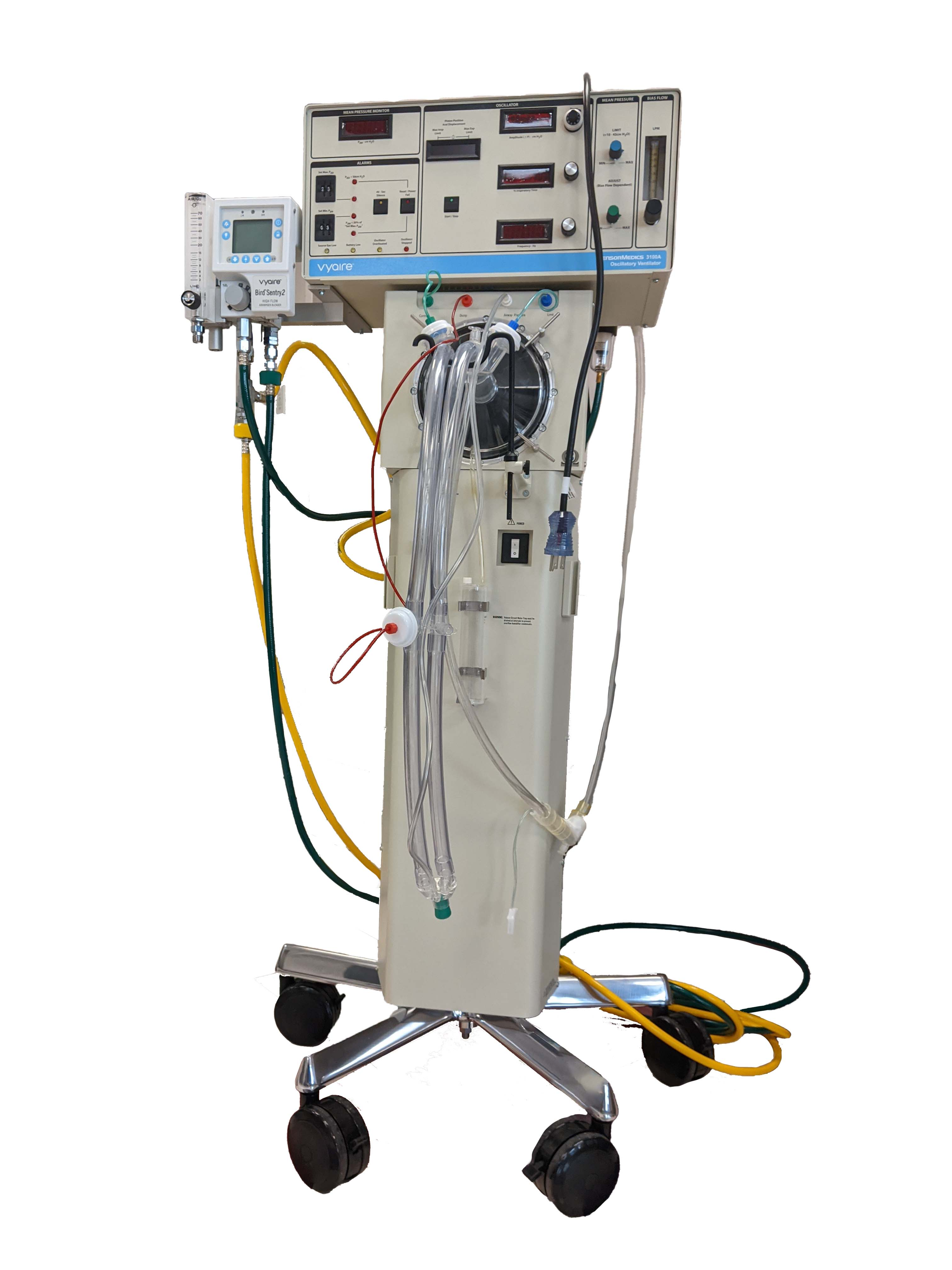
3100 A Oscillator

The SensorMedics High-Frequency Oscillatory Ventilator is a patented high-frequency (>150 R_{f}) mechanical ventilator designed and manufactured by SensorMedics Corp. of Yorba Linda, California. After a series of acquisitions, Vyaire Medical, Inc. marketed the product as 3100A/B HFOV Ventilators. Model 3100 (later 3100A) received premarket approval from the United States Food and Drug Administration (FDA) in 1991 for treatment of all forms of respiratory failure in neonatal patients. In 1995, it received pre-market approved for Pediatric Application with no upper weight limit for treating selected patients failing on conventional ventilation.

== 3100A ==
The 3100A model is used for infants and children under 35 kilograms (<35 kg).

== 3100B ==
The 3100B model is used for all other people weighing more than 35 kilograms.

== Controls and settings ==
=== Bias flow ===
Adjusting bias flow affects mean P_{aw}. Lowering bias flow may decrease the work of breathing and facilitate weaning.

Typical ranges

- Premature 8–15 LPM
- Near-term 10–20 LPM
- Small child 15–25 LPM
- Large Child 20–30 LPM

=== Adjust ===
This control sets the mean airway pressure, directly affecting lung volume and oxygenation.

The initial setting is slightly higher than the mean airway pressure for conventional ventilation.

=== Power ===
Piston displacement is controlled by the power setting. Power changes ventilation and thereby changes blood PaCO2 levels.

Typical values

Start with a power of 2.0 and adjust for chest wiggle to the umbilicus.

=== Inspiratory time % ===
T_{i%} is the percentage of time allotted for inspiration. Once this value is set, it rarely needs to be changed.

Typical values

- 33% is recommended by the manufacturer for almost all applications.
- Up to 50% is recommended in situations where lung recruitment is necessary.
- Any Inspiratory Time above 33% can cause air trapping and lead to barotrauma. Setting the Mean airway pressure 1–2 cm of h2O above the set MAP for a few minutes, then weaning back down to the original MAP can recruit alveoli safely.

=== Frequency ===
Frequency (R_{f}) is the number of breaths in one second, expressed in hertz (hz). One hertz is equal to 60 breaths per minute (R_{f}) .

Typical values and ranges

- The smaller the patient, the higher the frequency.
- The larger the patient, the lower the frequency.

Changes in frequency

- Decrease in frequency = increased tidal volume.
- Increase in frequency = decreased tidal volume.

== Problems ==
Since neither the 3100A or the 3100B measure actual tidal volumes, it is impossible to wean with precision; as a result, some clinicians find it problematic to use these machines for oscillatory ventilation.
