= Ventilator =

Device that provides mechanical ventilation to the lungs

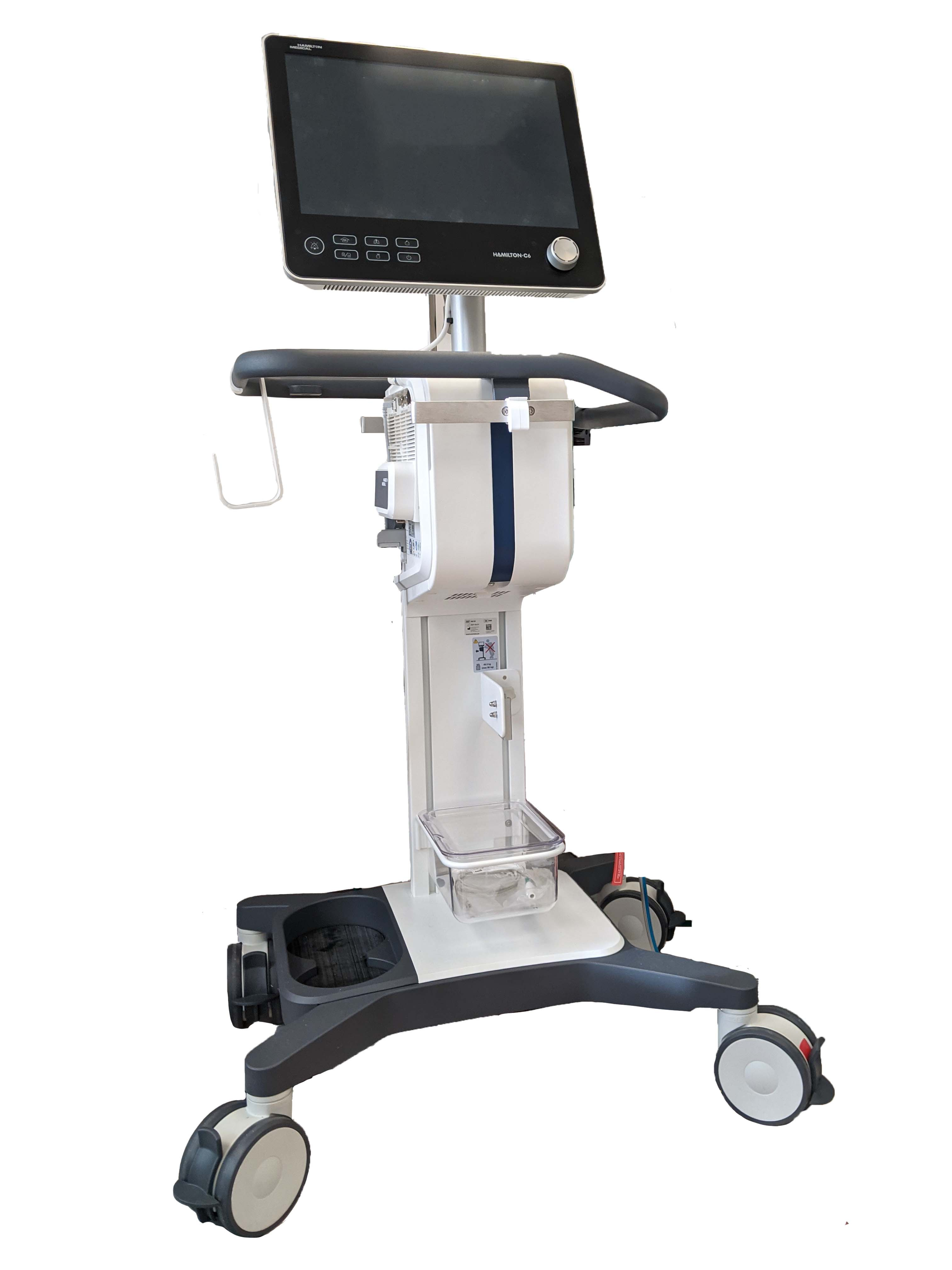
- Hamilton C6 Ventilator
- Specialty: Pulmonology
- [edit on Wikidata]

A ventilator is a type of breathing apparatus, a class of medical technology that provides mechanical ventilation by moving breathable air into and out of the lungs, to deliver breaths to a patient who is physically unable to breathe, or breathing insufficiently. Ventilators may be computerized microprocessor-controlled machines, but patients can also be ventilated with a simple, hand-operated bag valve mask. Ventilators are chiefly used in intensive-care medicine, home care, and emergency medicine (as standalone units) and in anesthesiology (as a component of an anesthesia machine).

Ventilators are sometimes called "respirators", a term commonly used for them in the 1950s (particularly the "Bird respirator"). However, contemporary medical terminology uses the word "respirator" to refer to a face-mask that protects wearers against hazardous airborne substances.

== Function ==
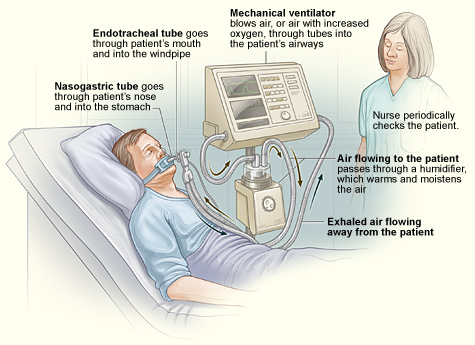
A standard setup for a ventilator in a hospital room. The ventilator pushes warm, moist air (or air with increased oxygen) to the patient. Exhaled air flows away from the patient.

In its simplest form, a modern positive pressure ventilator, consists of a compressible air reservoir or turbine, air and oxygen supplies, a set of valves and tubes, and a disposable or reusable "patient circuit". The air reservoir is pneumatically compressed several times a minute to deliver room-air, or in most cases, an air/oxygen mixture to the patient. If a turbine is used, the turbine pushes air through the ventilator, with a flow valve adjusting pressure to meet patient-specific parameters. When over pressure is released, the patient will exhale passively due to the lungs' elasticity, the exhaled air being released usually through a one-way valve within the patient circuit called the patient manifold.

Ventilators may also be equipped with monitoring and alarm systems for patient-related parameters (e.g., pressure, volume, and flow) and ventilator function (e.g., air leakage, power failure, mechanical failure), backup batteries, oxygen tanks, and remote control. The pneumatic system is nowadays often replaced by a computer-controlled turbopump.

=== Ventilator pressures labeled ===
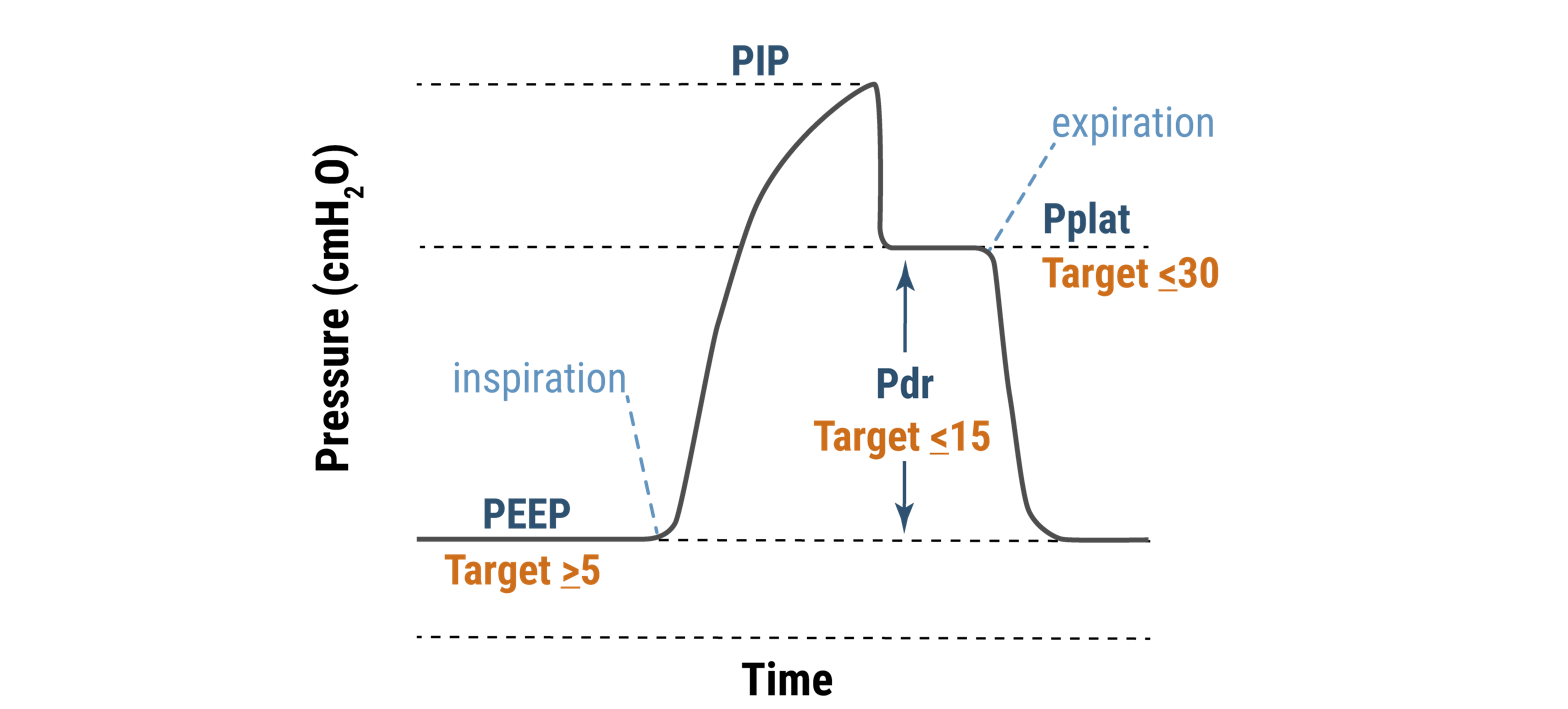
Ventilator pressures labeled

Modern ventilators are electronically controlled by a small embedded system to allow exact adaptation of pressure and flow characteristics to an individual patient's needs. Fine-tuned ventilator settings also serve to make ventilation more tolerable and comfortable for the patient. In Canada and the United States, respiratory therapists are responsible for tuning these settings, while biomedical technologists are responsible for the maintenance. In the United Kingdom and Europe the management of the patient's interaction with the ventilator is done by critical care nurses.

The patient circuit usually consists of a set of three durable, yet lightweight plastic tubes, separated by function (e.g. inhaled air, patient pressure, exhaled air). Determined by the type of ventilation needed, the patient-end of the circuit may be either noninvasive or invasive.

Noninvasive methods, such as continuous positive airway pressure (CPAP) and non-invasive ventilation, which are adequate for patients who require a ventilator only while sleeping and resting, mainly employ a nasal mask. Invasive methods require intubation, which for long-term ventilator dependence will normally be a tracheotomy cannula, as this is much more comfortable and practical for long-term care than is larynx or nasal intubation.

Closed circuit ventilator system are used to provide O_{2}-enriched air to the patient.

Open circuit ventilators are used to provide normal ambient air with normal O_{2} ratio to the patient.

At physiological level, ventilators renew the air and its critical O_{2}/CO_{2} exchange to pulmonary alveolus.

=== Safety-critical system ===
As failure may result in death, mechanical ventilation systems are classified as safety-critical systems, and precautions must be taken to ensure that they are highly reliable, including their power supply. Ventilatory failure is the inability to sustain a sufficient rate of CO_{2} elimination to maintain a stable pH without mechanical assistance, muscle fatigue, or intolerable dyspnea. Mechanical ventilators are therefore carefully designed so that no single point of failure can endanger the patient. They may have manual backup mechanisms to enable hand-driven respiration in the absence of power (such as the mechanical ventilator integrated into an anaesthetic machine). They may also have safety valves, which open to atmosphere in the absence of power to act as an anti-suffocation valve for spontaneous breathing of the patient. Some systems are also equipped with compressed-gas tanks, air compressors or backup batteries to provide ventilation in case of power failure or defective gas supplies, and methods to operate or call for help if their mechanisms or software fail. Power failures, such as during a natural disaster, can create a life-threatening emergency for people using ventilators in a home care setting. Battery power may be sufficient for a brief loss of electricity, but longer power outages may require going to a hospital.

== History ==
The history of mechanical ventilation begins with various versions of what was eventually called the iron lung, a form of noninvasive negative-pressure ventilator widely used during the polio epidemics of the twentieth century after the introduction of the "Drinker respirator" in 1928, improvements introduced by John Haven Emerson in 1931, and the Both respirator in 1937. Other forms of noninvasive ventilators, also used widely for polio patients, include Biphasic Cuirass Ventilation, the rocking bed, and rather primitive positive pressure machines.

In 1949, John Haven Emerson developed a mechanical assister for anaesthesia with the cooperation of the anaesthesia department at Harvard University. Mechanical ventilators began to be used increasingly in anaesthesia and intensive care during the 1950s. Their development was stimulated both by the need to treat polio patients and the increasing use of muscle relaxants during anaesthesia. Relaxant drugs paralyse the patient and improve operating conditions for the surgeon but also paralyse the respiratory muscles. In 1953 Bjørn Aage Ibsen set up what became the world's first Medical/Surgical ICU utilizing muscle relaxants and controlled ventilation.

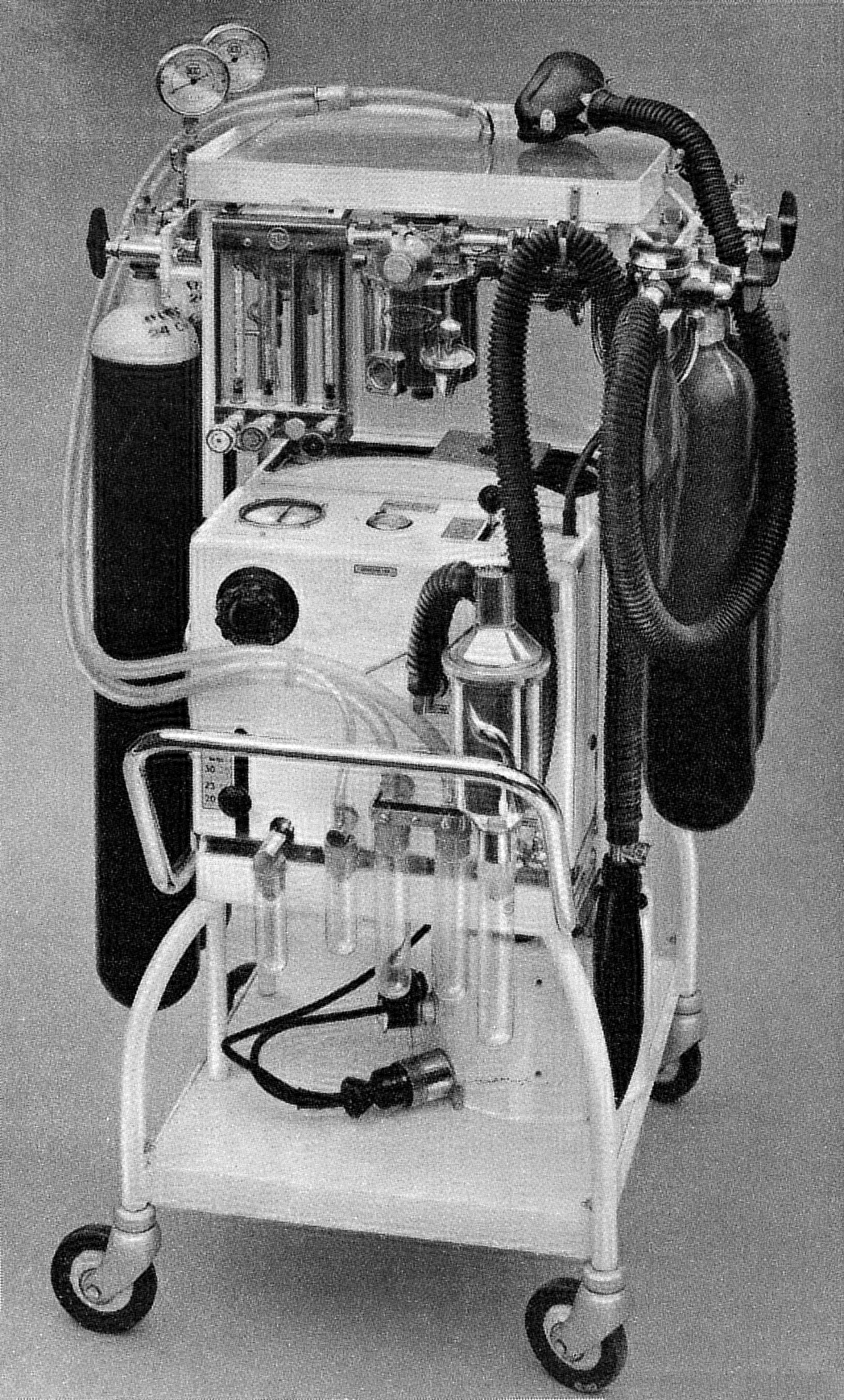
An East-Radcliffe respirator model from the mid-twentieth century

In the United Kingdom, the East Radcliffe and Beaver models were early examples. The former used a Sturmey-Archer bicycle hub gear to provide a range of speeds, and the latter an automotive windscreen wiper motor to drive the bellows used to inflate the lungs. Electric motors were, however, a problem in the operating theatres of that time, as their use caused an explosion hazard in the presence of flammable anaesthetics such as ether and cyclopropane. In 1952, Roger Manley of the Westminster Hospital, London, developed a ventilator which was entirely gas-driven and became the most popular model used in Europe. It was an elegant design, and became a great favourite with European anaesthetists for four decades, prior to the introduction of models controlled by electronics. It was independent of electrical power and caused no explosion hazard. The original Mark I unit was developed to become the Manley Mark II in collaboration with the Blease company, which manufactured many thousands of these units. Its principle of operation was very simple, an incoming gas flow was used to lift a weighted bellows unit, which fell intermittently under gravity, forcing breathing gases into the patient's lungs. The inflation pressure could be varied by sliding the movable weight on top of the bellows. The volume of gas delivered was adjustable using a curved slider, which restricted bellows excursion. Residual pressure after the completion of expiration was also configurable, using a small weighted arm visible to the lower right of the front panel. This was a robust unit and its availability encouraged the introduction of positive pressure ventilation techniques into mainstream European anesthetic practice.

The 1955 release of Forrest Bird's "Bird Universal Medical Respirator" in the United States changed the way mechanical ventilation was performed, with the small green box becoming a familiar piece of medical equipment. The unit was sold as the Bird Mark 7 Respirator and informally called the "Bird". It was a pneumatic device and therefore required no electrical power source to operate.

In 1965, the Army Emergency Respirator was developed in collaboration with the Harry Diamond Laboratories (now part of the U.S. Army Research Laboratory) and Walter Reed Army Institute of Research. Its design incorporated the principle of fluid amplification in order to govern pneumatic functions. Fluid amplification allowed the respirator to be manufactured entirely without moving parts, yet capable of complex resuscitative functions. Elimination of moving parts increased performance reliability and minimized maintenance. The mask is composed of a poly(methyl methacrylate) (commercially known as Lucite) block, about the size of a pack of cards, with machined channels and a cemented or screwed-in cover plate. The reduction of moving parts cut manufacturing costs and increased durability.

The bistable fluid amplifier design allowed the respirator to function as both a respiratory assistor and controller. It could functionally transition between assistor and controller automatically, based on the patient's needs. The dynamic pressure and turbulent jet flow of gas from inhalation to exhalation allowed the respirator to synchronize with the breathing of the patient.

Intensive care environments around the world revolutionized in 1971 by the introduction of the first SERVO 900 ventilator (Elema-Schönander), constructed by Björn Jonson. It was a small, silent and effective electronic ventilator, with the famous SERVO feedback system controlling what had been set and regulating delivery. For the first time, the machine could deliver the set volume in volume control ventilation.

=== Microprocessor ventilators ===
Microprocessor control led to the third generation of intensive care unit (ICU) ventilators, starting with the Dräger EV-A in 1982 in Germany which allowed monitoring the patient's breathing curve on an LCD monitor. One year later followed Puritan Bennett 7200 and Bear 1000, SERVO 300 and Hamilton Veolar over the next decade. Microprocessors enable customized gas delivery and monitoring, and mechanisms for gas delivery that are much more responsive to patient needs than previous generations of mechanical ventilators.

== Open-source ventilators ==
An open-source ventilator is a disaster-situation ventilator made using a freely-licensed design, and ideally, freely-available components and parts. Designs, components, and parts may be anywhere from completely reverse-engineered to completely new creations, components may be adaptations of various inexpensive existing products, and special hard-to-find and/or expensive parts may be 3D printed instead of sourced.

During the 2019–2020 COVID-19 pandemic, various kinds of ventilators have been considered. Deaths caused by COVID-19 have occurred when the most severely infected experience acute respiratory distress syndrome, a widespread inflammation in the lungs that impairs the lungs' ability to absorb oxygen and expel carbon dioxide. These patients require a capable ventilator to continue breathing.

Among ventilators that might be brought into use for treating people with COVID-19, there have been many concerns. These include current availability, the challenge of making more and lower cost ventilators, effectiveness, functional design, safety, portability, suitability for infants, assignment to treat other illnesses, and operator training. Deploying the best possible mix of ventilators can save the most lives.

Although not formally open-sourced, the Ventec V+ Pro ventilator was developed in April 2020 as a shared effort between Ventec Life Systems and General Motors, to provide a rapid supply of 30,000 ventilators capable of treating COVID-19 patients.

A major worldwide design effort began during the 2019–2020 coronavirus pandemic after a Hackaday project was started, in order to respond to expected ventilator shortages causing higher mortality rate among severe patients.

On March 20, 2020, the Irish Health Service began reviewing designs. A prototype is being designed and tested in Colombia.

The Polish company Urbicum reports successful testing of a 3D-printed open-source prototype device called VentilAid. The makers describe it as a last resort device when professional equipment is missing. The design is publicly available. The first Ventilaid prototype requires compressed air to run.

On March 21, 2020, the New England Complex Systems Institute (NECSI) began maintaining a strategic list of open source designs being worked on. The NECSI project considers manufacturing capability, medical safety and need for treating patients in various conditions, speed dealing with legal and political issues, logistics and supply. NECSI is staffed with scientists from Harvard and MIT and others who have an understanding of pandemics, medicine, systems, risk, and data collection.

The University of Minnesota Bakken Medical Device Center initiated a collaboration with various companies to bring a ventilator alternative to the market that works as a one-armed robot and replaces the need for manual ventilation in emergency situations. The Coventor device was developed in a very short time and approved on April 15, 2020, by the FDA, only 30 days after conception. The mechanical ventilator is designed for use by trained medical professionals in intensive care units and easy to operate. It has a compact design and is relatively inexpensive to manufacture and distribute. The cost is only about 4% of a normal ventilator. In addition, this device does not require pressurized oxygen or air supply, as is normally the case. A first series is manufactured by Boston Scientific. The plans are to be freely available online to the general public without royalties.

== COVID-19 pandemic ==
The COVID-19 pandemic has led to shortages of essential goods and services - from hand sanitizers to masks to beds to ventilators. Countries around the world have experienced shortages of ventilators. Furthermore, fifty-four governments, including many in Europe and Asia, imposed restrictions on medical supply exports in response to the coronavirus pandemic.

The capacities to produce and distribute invasive and non-invasive ventilators vary by country. In the initial phase of the pandemic, China ramped up its production of ventilators, secured large amounts of donations from private firms, and dramatically increased imports of medical devices worldwide. As a result, the country accumulated a reservoir of ventilators throughout the pandemic in Wuhan. Western Europe and the United States, which outrank China in their production capacities, suffered a shortage of supplies due to the sudden and scattered outbreaks throughout the North American and European continents. Finally, Central Asia, Africa, and Latin America, which depend almost entirely on importing ventilators, suffered severe shortages of supplies.

Healthcare policy-makers have met serious challenges to estimate the number of ventilators needed and used during the pandemic. When data is often not available for ventilators specifically, estimates are sometimes made based on the number of intensive care unit beds available, which often contain ventilators.

=== United States ===
In 2006, president George W. Bush signed the Pandemic and All-Hazards Preparedness Act, which created the Biomedical Advanced Research and Development Authority (BARDA) within the United States Department of Health and Human Services. In preparation for a possible epidemic of respiratory disease, the newly created office awarded a $6 million contract to Newport Medical Instruments, a small company in California, to make 40,000 ventilators for under $3,000 apiece. In 2011, Newport sent three prototypes to the Centers for Disease Control. In 2012, Covidien, a $12 billion/year medical device manufacturer, which manufactured more expensive competing ventilators, bought Newport for $100 million. Covidien delayed and in 2014 cancelled the contract.

BARDA started over again with a new company, Philips, and in July 2019, the FDA approved the Philips ventilator, and the government ordered 10,000 ventilators for delivery in mid-2020.

On April 23, 2020, NASA reported building, in 37 days, a successful COVID-19 ventilator, named VITAL ("Ventilator Intervention Technology Accessible Locally"). On April 30, NASA reported receiving fast-track approval for emergency use by the United States Food and Drug Administration for the new ventilator. On May 29, NASA reported that eight manufacturers were selected to manufacture the new ventilator.

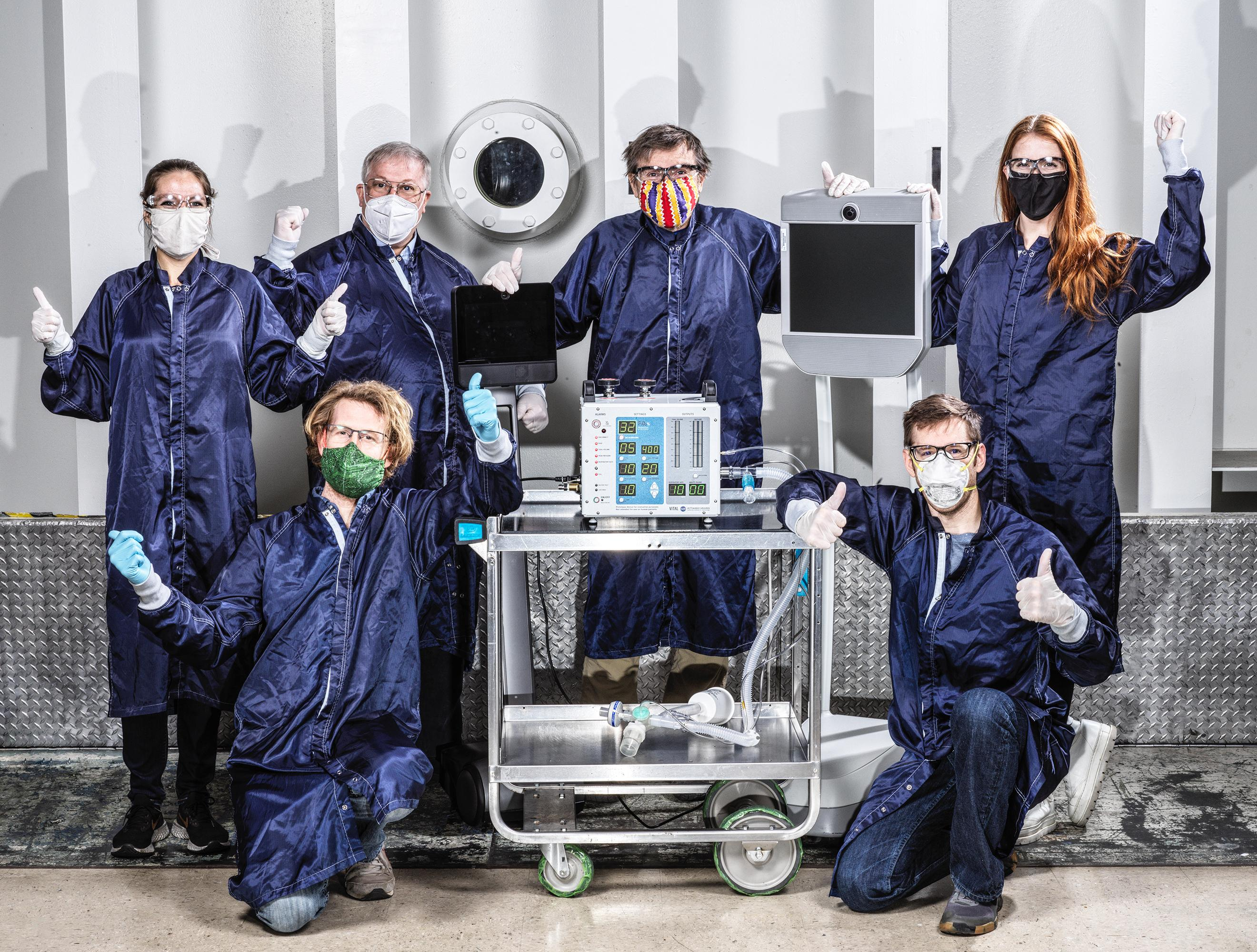
Engineering team

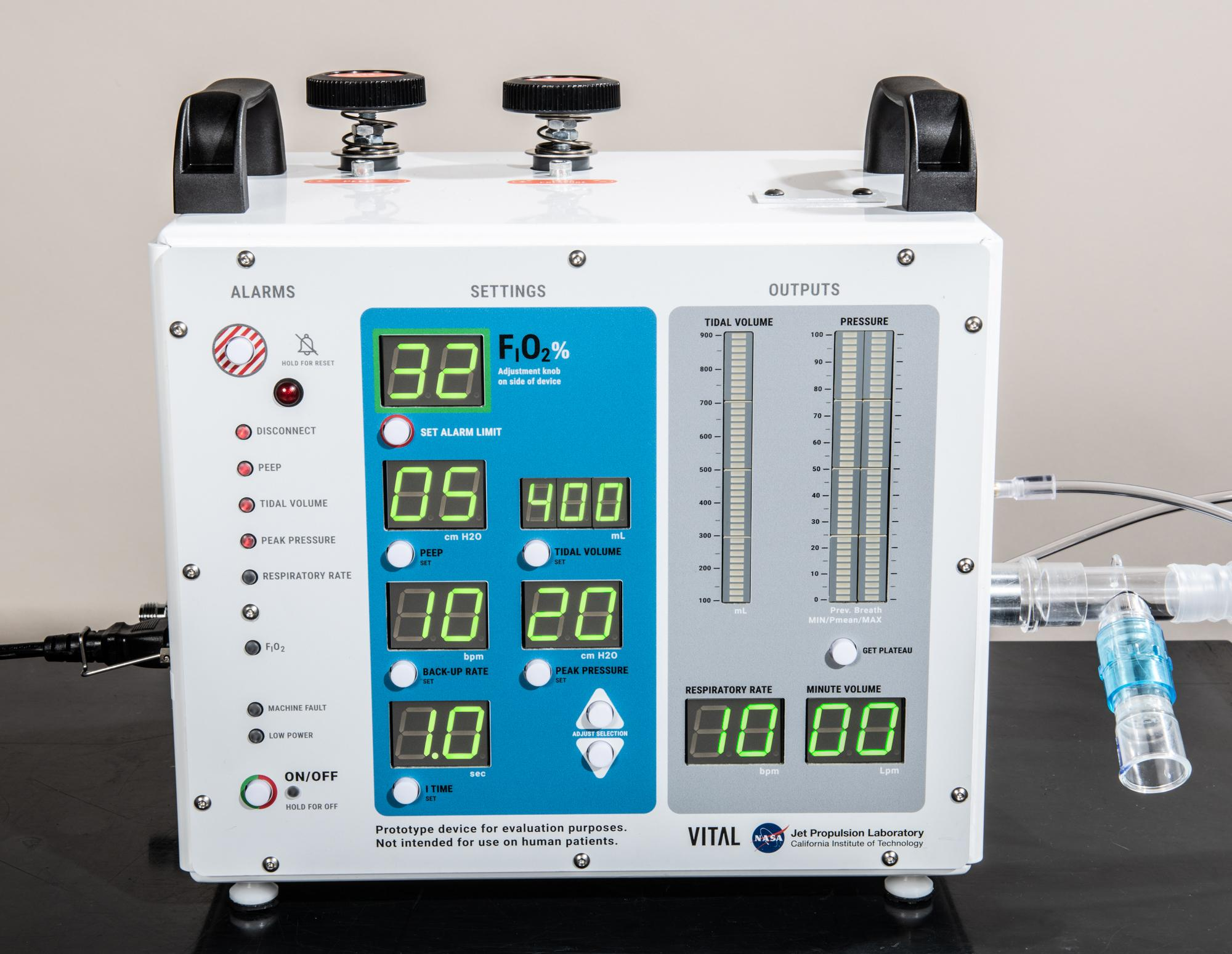
Front view

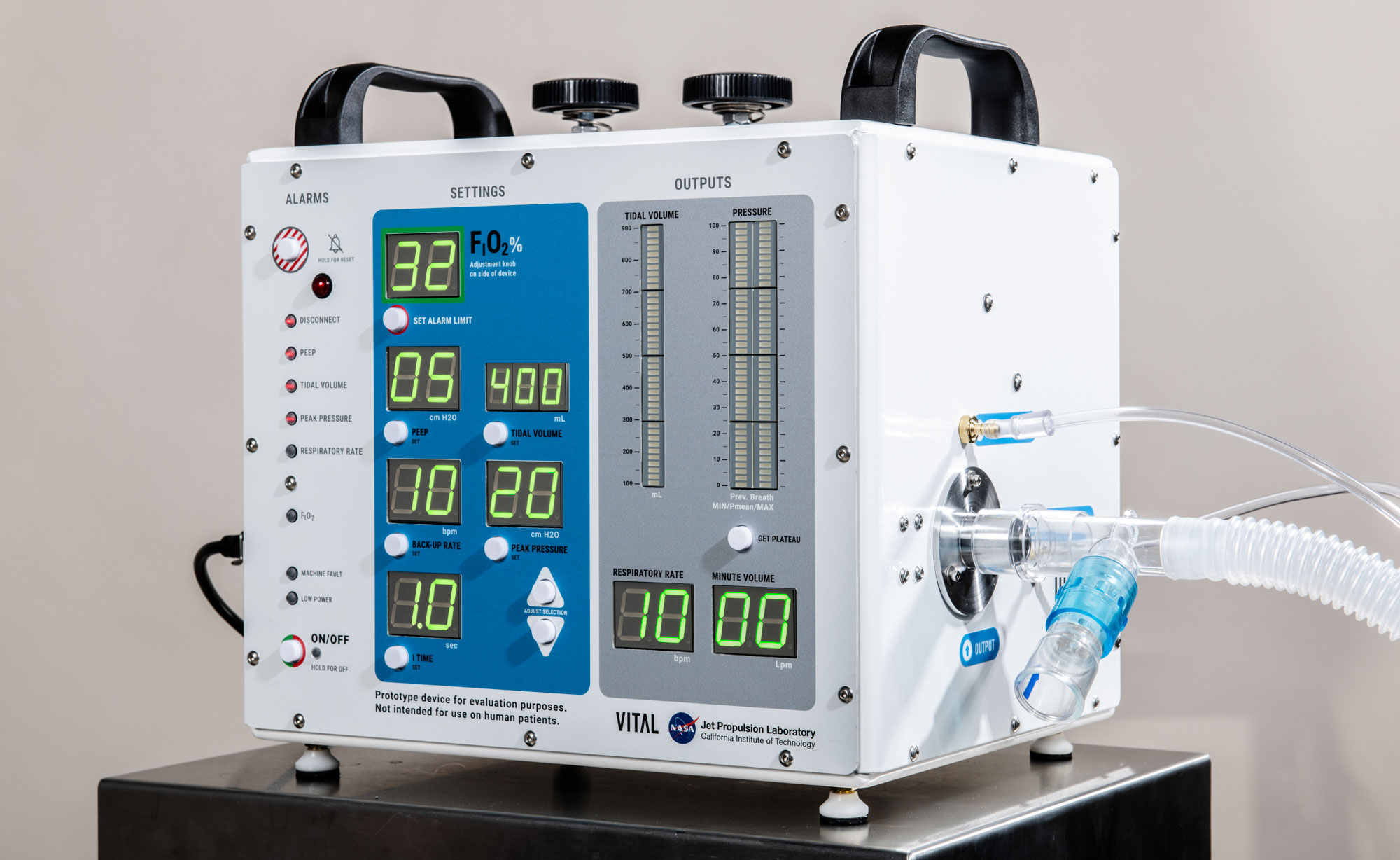
Side view

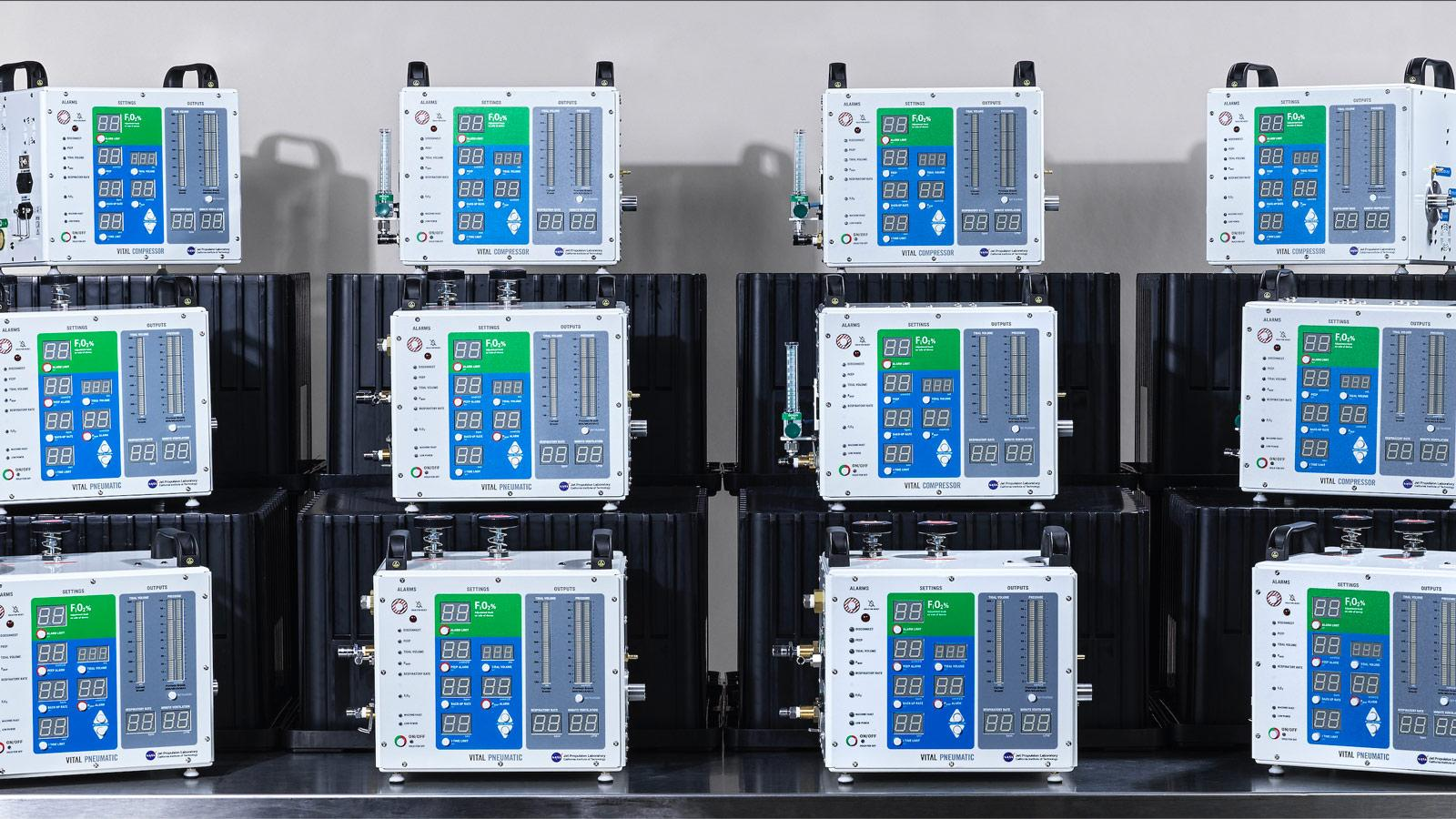
Stacks of ventilator prototypes

=== Canada ===
On April 7, 2020, Prime Minister Justin Trudeau announced that the Canadian Federal Government would be sourcing thousands of 'Made in Canada' ventilators. A number of organisations responded from across the country. They delivered a large quantity of ventilators to the National Emergency Strategic Stockpile. From west to east, the companies include Canadian Emergency Ventilators Inc, Bayliss Medical Inc, Thornhill Medical, Vexos Inc, and CAE Inc.

== See also ==
- Artificial ventilation
- Iron lung (Tank ventilator)
- Bragg-Paul ventilator
- Liquid ventilator
- Open-source hardware
- Respiratory therapy
- SensorMedics high-frequency oscillatory ventilator
- Two-balloon experiment
- Robert Martensen
- Joseph Stoddart
