= Perfluorotripentylamine =

Names
- Preferred IUPAC name 1,1,2,2,3,3,4,4,5,5,5-Undecafluoro-N,N-bis(undecafluoropentyl)pentan-1-amine
- Other names: Perfluorotriamylamine; Tri(perfluoropentyl)amine; Tris(perfluoropentyl)amine; Fluorinert FC-70; Perfluoro-compound FC-70; FC-70

Identifiers
CAS Number	338-84-1
3D model (JSmol)	Interactive image
ChemSpider	60965
ECHA InfoCard	100.005.838
PubChem CID	67646
CompTox Dashboard (EPA)	DTXSID4059835
- InChI: InChI=1S/C15F33N/c16-1(17,4(22,23)10(34,35)36)7(28,29)13(43,44)49(14(45,46)8(30,31)2(18,19)5(24,25)11(37,38)39)15(47,48)9(32,33)3(20,21)6(26,27)12(40,41)42 Key: AQZYBQIAUSKCCS-UHFFFAOYSA-N
- SMILES: C(C(C(N(C(C(C(C(C(F)(F)F)(F)F)(F)F)(F)F)(F)F)C(C(C(C(C(F)(F)F)(F)F)(F)F)(F)F)(F)F)(F)F)(F)F)(C(C(F)(F)F)(F)F)(F)F

Properties
Chemical formula	N((CF_{2})_{4}CF_{3})_{3}
Molar mass	821.119 g·mol^{−1}
Appearance	Colorless
Density	1.94 g/cm^{3}
Boiling point	215 °C (419 °F; 488 K)
Solubility in water	<5 ppm
Refractive index (n_{D})	1.303
- Except where otherwise noted, data are given for materials in their standard state (at 25 °C [77 °F], 100 kPa). verify (what is ?) Infobox references

Perfluorotripentylamine is an organic compound with the chemical formula N((CF_{2})_{4}CF_{3})_{3}. A molecule of this chemical compound consists of three pentyl groups connected to one nitrogen atom, in which all of the hydrogen atoms are replaced with fluorine atoms. It is a perfluorocarbon. It is used as an electronics coolant, and has a high boiling point. It is colorless, odorless, and insoluble in water. Unlike ordinary amines, perfluoroamines are of low basicity. Perfluorinated amines are components of fluorofluids, used as immersive coolants for supercomputers.

It is prepared by electrofluorination of the amine using hydrogen fluoride as solvent and source of fluorine:

N((CH_{2})_{4}CH_{3})_{3} + 33 HF → N((CF_{2})_{4}CF_{3})_{3} + 33 H_{2}

== Safety ==
Fluoroamines are generally of very low toxicity, so much that they have been evaluated as synthetic blood.

== See also ==
- Perfluorotributylamine
