= Artificial gills (human) =

Hypothetical devices to extract oxygen from water

Artificial gills are hypothetical devices to allow a human to be able to take in oxygen from surrounding water. This is speculative technology that has not yet been demonstrated. Natural gills work because most animals with gills are thermoconformers (cold-blooded), so they need much less oxygen than a thermoregulator (warm-blood) of the same size. However, there are exceptions, for example, Opah, Great White Shark and Tuna. It is currently unclear if a practical artificial gill could be created; however, creating a biological gill with genetic engineering is theoretically possible.

== Methods ==
Several potential methods exist for the development of artificial gills. One proposed method is the use of liquid breathing with a membrane oxygenator to solve the problem of carbon dioxide retention, the major limiting factor in liquid breathing. It is thought that a system such as this would allow for diving without risk of decompression sickness.

An average freediver needs 150ml of oxygen per minute while resting and 200-250ml of oxygen while swimming. Assuming the mammalian diving reflex, some divers can reduce their heartbeat significantly, down to 14 bpm, radically reducing overall body oxygen demands even down to 100ml per minute. The amount of dissolved oxygen in water varies, but on average is 7.6mg per liter. At least 37.5 liters (9.9 U.S. gal) of seawater per minute would have to be passed through the system, but this system would not work in anoxic water. Seawater in tropical regions with abundant plant life contains 6–8 mg (0.093–0.123 gr) of oxygen per liter of water. These calculations are based on the dissolved oxygen content of water.

== See also ==
- Extracorporeal membrane oxygenation
- Henry's law – Gas law regarding proportionality of dissolved gas
