= Liquid dielectric =

Electrically insulating substance in liquid form

A liquid dielectric is a dielectric material in liquid state. Its main purpose is to prevent or rapidly quench electric discharges. Dielectric liquids are used as electrical insulators in high voltage applications, e.g. transformers, capacitors, high voltage cables, and switchgear (namely high voltage switchgear). Its function is to provide electrical insulation, suppress corona and arcing, and to serve as a coolant.

A good liquid dielectric should have high dielectric strength, high thermal stability and inertness against the construction materials used, non-flammability and low toxicity, good heat transfer properties, and low cost.

Liquid dielectrics are self-healing; when an electric breakdown occurs, the discharge channel does not leave a permanent conductive trace in the fluid.

The electrical properties tend to be strongly influenced by dissolved gases (e.g. oxygen or carbon dioxide), dust, fibers, and especially ionic impurities and moisture. Electrical discharge may cause production of impurities degrading the dielectric's performance.

Some examples of dielectric liquids are transformer oil, perfluoroalkanes, and purified water.

Overview of common liquid dielectrics
Name	Dielectric constant	Max. breakdown strength (MV/cm)	Properties
Mineral oil		1.0	Flammable. Common type of transformer oil.
n-Hexane		1.1–1.3	Flammable. Used in some capacitors.
n-Heptane			Flammable.
Castor oil natural ester	4.7		High dielectric constant. Flammable. Refined and dried castor oil is used in some high voltage capacitors.
Hatcol 5005 synthetic ester	3.2		High dielectric constant. Fire Resistant. Biodegradable PCB replacement. Low temperature fluidity.
Silicone oil	2.3–2.8 (-20)	1.0-1.2	More expensive than hydrocarbons. Less flammable.
Fluorinert FC-72	1.75	>0.16	More expensive than hydrocarbons. Non flammable and non toxic. High global warming potential. Boiling point of 56 °C.
Novec 649	1.8	>0.16	More expensive than hydrocarbons. Non flammable and non toxic. Low global warming potential. Boiling point of 49 °C.
Novec 7100	7.4	>0.01	More expensive than hydrocarbons. Higher Dk compared to other perfluoroalkanes. Non flammable and non toxic. Low global warming potential. Boiling point of 61 °C.
Polychlorinated biphenyls			Formerly used in transformers and capacitors. Persistent organic pollutant, toxic, now phased out. Low flammability.
Purified water	78		High thermal capacity, good cooling properties. Low electrical conductivity when free of ions.
Benzene	2.28	1.1	Toxic, flammable.
Liquid oxygen		2.4	Cryogenic. Highly flammable with combustible materials.
Liquid nitrogen	1.43	1.6-1.9	Cryogenic. Used as coolant with many low-temperature sensors and high-temperature superconductors.
Liquid hydrogen		1.0	Cryogenic. Flammable.
Liquid helium		0.7	Cryogenic. Used with superconductors.
Liquid argon		1.10–1.42	Cryogenic.

== See also ==
- Dielectric gas
