= Fluorinated gases =

Regulatory term for fluorinated greenhouse gases

Fluorinated gases (F-gases) is a term used by regulators to refer to fluorinated greenhouse gases. Major classes include hydrofluorocarbons (HFCs), perfluorocarbons (PFCs), and sulphur hexafluoride (SF_{6}). They are used in refrigeration, air conditioning, heat pumps, fire suppression, electronics, aerospace, magnesium industry, foam, and high voltage switchgear. Their use is regulated due to their strong global warming potential.

== Types of F-gases ==
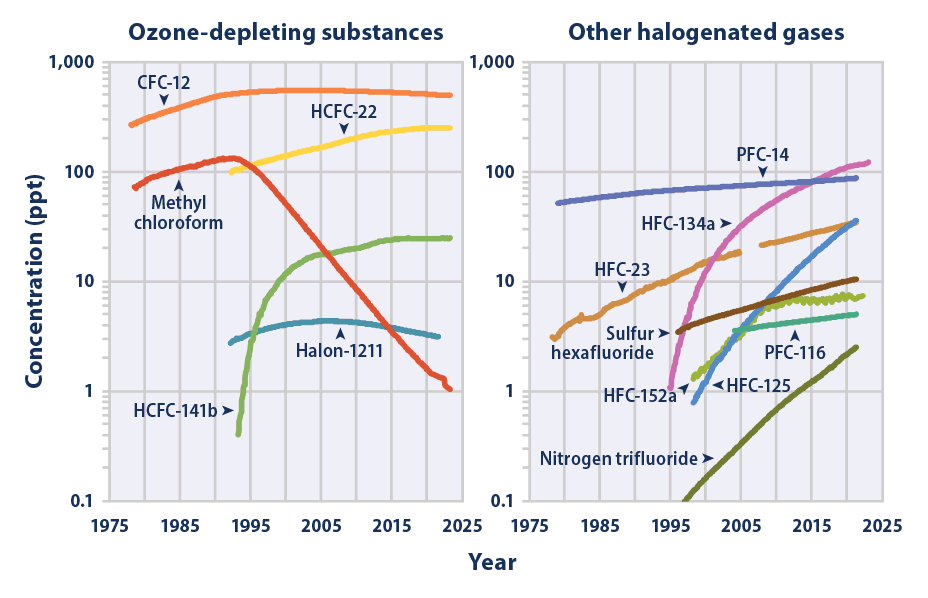
Atmospheric concentration of SF_{6}, NF_{3}, and several widely used HFCs and PFCs between years 1978 and 2015 (right graph). Note the logarithmic scale.

The most common F-gases are hydrofluorocarbons (HFCs), which contain hydrogen, fluorine, and carbon. They are used heat-exchange applications including refrigeration, air-conditioning systems, heat pump equipment, and as blowing agents for foams, fire extinguishants, aerosol propellants, and solvents. HFC-134a (1,1,1,2-Tetrafluoroethane) has grown to become the most abundant HFC in Earth's atmosphere as of year 2015.

Perfluorocarbons (PFCs), compounds consisting only of fluorine and carbon, are used in the electronics industries, as well as in refrigeration when combined with other gases. PFCs were commonly used as fire extinguishants in the past and are still found in older fire protection systems. They are also a by-product of the aluminium smelting process. PFC-14 (carbon tetrafluoride (CF_{4})) was grown the most abundant PFC in earth's atmosphere as of the year 2015.

Sulphur hexafluoride (SF_{6}) is used primarily as an arc suppression and insulation gas. It can be found in high-voltage switchgears and is used in the production of magnesium.

Nitrogen trifluoride (NF_{3}) is used primarily as an etchant for microelectronics fabrication.

Besides the F-gases listed above, which are regulated under the Kyoto Protocol, the UNFCCC "strongly [encourages]" emissions and removals reporting for fluorinated gases where "100-year global warming potential values are available from the IPCC but have not yet been adopted by the COP." As of 2024, the European Union considers a number of additional compounds, including selected hydrofluoroethers, fluoroalcohols, hydrofluoroolefins, hydrochlorofluoroolefins, and perfluorinated substances such as trifluoromethylsulfur pentafluoride, to be F-gases for reporting purposes.

=== Excluded fluorinated gases ===
Chlorofluorocarbons (CFCs) and hydrochlorofluorocarbons (HCFCs) also contain fluorine and are often found in gas form, but are not generally described as fluorinated gases. Furthermore, many fluorinated ethers are used as inhalation anesthetics, but these are also excluded.

== Use history ==
HFCs were developed in the 1990s to substitute for substances such as chlorofluorocarbons (CFCs) and hydrochlorofluorocarbons (HCFCs). As these substances were found to deplete the ozone layer, the Montreal Protocol began to lay down provisions for them to be phased-out globally after the agreement was ratified in 1987.

PFCs and SF_{6} were already in use before the Montreal Protocol.

NF_{3} use has grown since the 1990s along with the rapid expansion of the microelectronics fabrication industry.

== Environmental impact of F-gases ==
Annual growths in radiative forcing contributions from atmospheric HFCs and HCFCs have recently peaked near 10%, as compared to steadier 1%-2% growth from the major carbon- and nitrogen-cycle greenhouse gases.

F-gases are ozone-friendly, enable energy efficiency, and are relatively safe for use by the public due to their low levels of toxicity and flammability. However, most F-gases have a high global warming potential (GWP), and some are nearly inert to removal by chemical processes. If released, HFCs stay in the atmosphere for decades and both PFCs and SF_{6} can stay in the atmosphere for millennia. According to the IPCC Sixth Assessment Report fluorinated gases have contributed 0.1 °C to historical global warming, while CO_{2} has contributed a 0.8 °C.

The total atmospheric concentration of F-gases, CFCs, and HCFCs has grown rapidly since the mid-twentieth century; a time which marks the start of their production and use at industrial scale. As a group in year 2019, these unnatural man-made gases are responsible for about one-tenth of the direct radiative forcing from all long-lived anthropogenic greenhouse gases.

F-gases are used in a number of applications intended for climate change mitigation, that can generate further positive feedback for atmospheric heating. For example, refrigeration and air conditioning systems are increasingly utilized by humans within a warming environment. Likewise, expansions of electrical infrastructure, as driven by the alternatives to fossil fuels, has led to rising demand for SF_{6}. If recent trends of aggressive (5% and greater CAGR) annual growth for such types of F-gas production were to continue into the future without complimentary reductions in GWP and/or atmospheric leakage, their warming influence could soon rival those of CO_{2} and CH_{4} which are trending at less than about 2% annual growth.

== Regulation of F-gases ==
=== International level ===
Although the Montreal Protocol regulates the phasing out of HCFCs, there was no international agreement on the regulation of HFCs until late 2016 when the Kigali Amendment under the Montreal Protocol was signed, which has put a compulsory phase wise phasing out of CFC gases. Efforts are ongoing to develop a global approach for the control of HFCs. Most recently, this has taken the form of a declaration of support for a global phase-down as part of the outcomes of the "Rio+20" United Nations Conference on Sustainable Development.

=== US-level ===
In the United States, the regulation of F-gases falls under the authority of the Environmental Protection Agency's overall attempts to combat greenhouse gases. The United States has put forward a joint proposal with Mexico and the Federated States of Micronesia for a phase-down of HFCs by 2030. The American Innovation and Manufacturing Act is federal legislation that mandates at 85% reduction in the production and consumption of HFC refrigerants by 2035, in compliance with the Kigali Amendment.

=== EU-level regulation ===
In order to combat the potential global warming effects of F-gases, and as part of the EU's Kyoto Protocol commitments, in 2006 the European Union passed two pieces of legislation controlling their use: the F-gas Regulation (EC) No 842/2006 and the Mobile Air Conditioning Directive Directive 2006/40/EC. The F-gas Regulation adopts an approach based on containment and recovery of F-gases as well as imposing obligations on reporting, training and labeling on those using F-gases.

On 26 September 2011, the Commission issued a report on the application, effects and adequacy of the Regulation, drawing from the results of an analytical study it commissioned from German environmental research institute, Öko-Recherche. A further study, conducted by the Armines Centre energétique et procédés and by Energy Research Innovation Engineering (ERIE) found that emissions reductions of up to 60% can be achieved by improving containment measures and accelerating the changeover from high GWP refrigerants to ones with lower GWP.

On 7 November 2012, the European Commission published the proposal to revise the F-gas Regulation. In December 2013, the European Parliament and the Council of the EU agreed the text of the revised regulation, which shall be applied from 1 January 2015.

=== China ===
There are no regulations regarding SF_{6} currently in China, even though some measures for reducing emissions were taken by the government. The emissions of this gas are currently on the rise in China (and in other countries defined as non-Annex-I by the United Nations Framework Convention on Climate Change) "due to their rapid expansion of power demand and fast adoption of renewable energy technologies". In China, they are now close to total greenhouse gas emissions from the Netherlands or Nigeria.

== See also ==
- Greenhouse gas
- Montreal Protocol
- Refrigerant
