= Phases of fluorine =

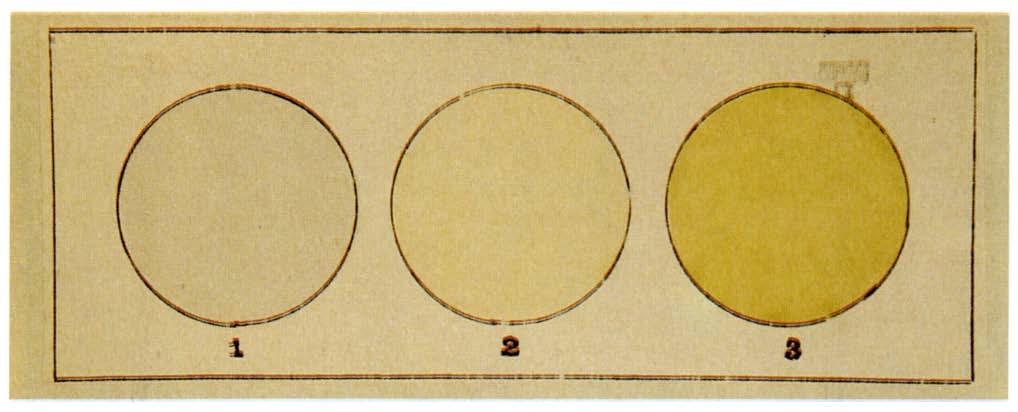
Henri Moissan's 1892 record of fluorine gas color, viewed end-on in a 5‑m tube. Air (1) is on the left, fluorine (2) is in the middle, chlorine (3) is on the right.

Fluorine forms diatomic molecules (F_{2}) that are gaseous at room temperature with a density about 1.3 times that of air. (Note: Density of air at 100 kilopascal and 0 °C is 1.2724 g/L.) Though sometimes described as yellow-green, pure fluorine gas is actually a very pale yellow. The color can only be observed in concentrated fluorine gas when looking down the axis of long tubes, as it appears transparent when observed from the side in normal tubes or if allowed to escape into the atmosphere. The element has a "pungent" characteristic odor that is noticeable in concentrations as low as 20 ppb.

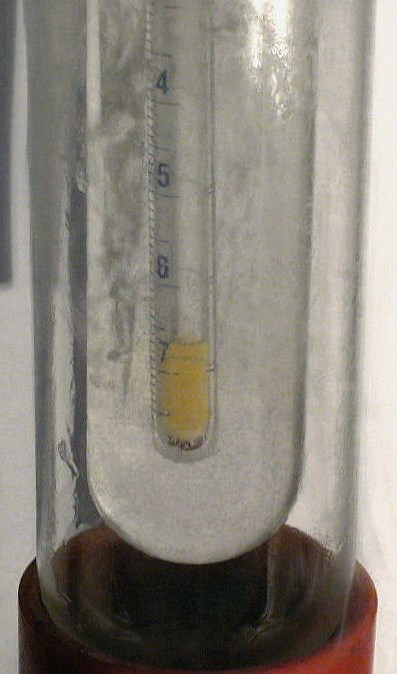
Liquid fluorine

Fluorine condenses to a bright yellow liquid at −188 °C (−307 °F), which is near the condensation temperatures of oxygen and nitrogen.

The solid states of fluorine rely on Van der Waals forces to hold molecules together, which, because of the small size of the fluorine molecules, are relatively weak. Consequently, the solid states of fluorine are more similar to that of oxygen or the noble gases than to those of the heavier halogens.

Animation showing the crystal structure of beta-fluorine.

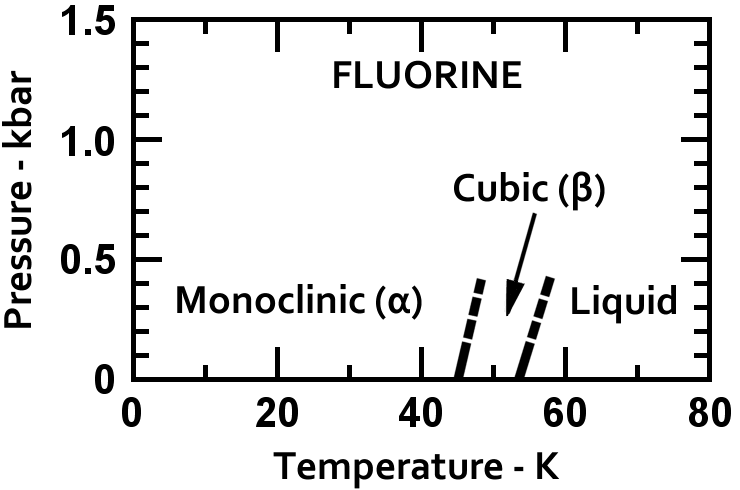
Low-temperature fluorine phases

Fluorine solidifies at −220 °C (−363 °F) into a cubic structure, called beta-fluorine. This phase is transparent and soft, with significant disorder of the molecules; its density is 1.70 g/cm^{3}.

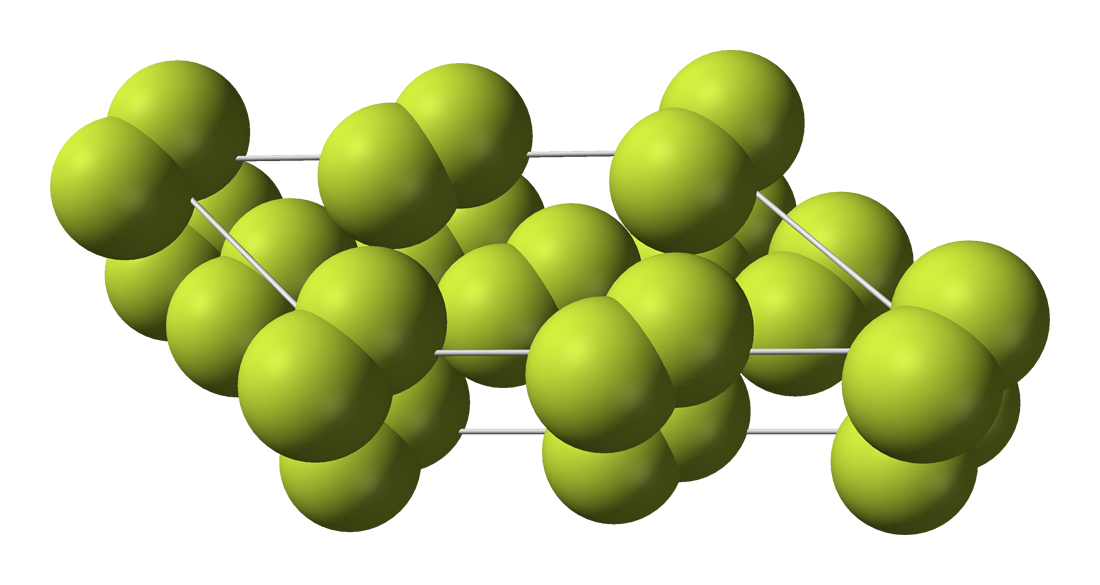
Alpha-fluorine crystal structure

At −228 °C (−378 °F) fluorine undergoes a solid–solid phase transition into a monoclinic structure called alpha-fluorine. This phase is opaque and hard, with close-packed layers of molecules, and is denser at 1.97 g/cm^{3}. The solid state phase change requires more energy than the melting point transition and can be violent, shattering samples and blowing out sample holder windows.

== History ==
Henri Moissan was the first to isolate the element in 1886, observing its gaseous phase. Eleven years later, Sir James Dewar first liquified the element. For unclear reasons, Dewar measured a density for the liquid about 40% too small, and would not be corrected until 1951. Solid fluorine received significant study in the 1920s and 30s, but relatively less until the 1960s. The crystal structure of alpha-fluorine given, which still has some uncertainty, dates to a 1970 paper by Linus Pauling.

== Indexed references ==
- Dean, John A. (1999). Lange's handbook of chemistry (15th ed.). McGraw-Hill, Inc. ISBN 0-07-016190-9.
- Ullmann, Franz, ed. (2005). Encyclopedia of Industrial Chemistry. Wiley-VCH. ISBN 978-3-527-30673-2.
  - Jaccaud, Michael; Faron, Robert; Devilliers, Didier; Romano, René (2000). "Fluorine". Ullmann's Encyclopedia of Industrial Chemistry. doi:10.1002/14356007.a11_293. ISBN 3527306730.
- Lide, David R. (2004). Handbook of Chemistry and Physics (84th ed.). Boca Raton: CRC Press. ISBN 0-8493-0566-7.
- Meyer, Lothar; Barrett, C. S.; Greer, Sandra C. (15 August 1969) [4 March 1968]. "The crystal structure of α-fluorine". Journal of Chemical Physics. 49 (4). American Institute of Physics: 1902–1907. Bibcode:1968JChPh..49.1902M. doi:10.1063/1.1670323.
- Jordan, T. H.; Streib, W. E.; Lipscomb, W. N. (1964). "Single-Crystal X-Ray Diffraction Study of β-Fluorine". The Journal of Chemical Physics. 41 (3): 760. Bibcode:1964JChPh..41..760J. doi:10.1063/1.1725957.
- Burdon, J.; Emson, B.; Edwards, A. J. (1987). "Is Fluorine Gas Really Yellow?". Journal of Fluorine Chemistry. 34 (3–4): 471–474. doi:10.1016/S0022-1139(00)85188-X.
- Young, David A. (1975). Phase Diagrams of the Elements (Report). Springer.
- Barrett, C. S.; Meyer, L.; Wasserman, J. (1967). "Argon—Fluorine Phase Diagram". The Journal of Chemical Physics. 47 (2): 740–743. Bibcode:1967JChPh..47..740B. doi:10.1063/1.1711946.
- Jordan, T. H.; Streib, W. D.; Smith, H. W.; Lipscomb, W. N. (1964). "Single-crystal studies of β-F2and of γ-O2". Acta Crystallographica. 17 (6): 777. doi:10.1107/S0365110X6400202X.
