= Paul Lebeau =

French chemist (1868–1959)

- Born: 19 December 1868; Boiscommun, France
- Died: 18 November 1959 (aged 90); Massy, France
- Known for: discovery of several fluorine compound
- Scientific career
- Doctoral advisor: Henri Moissan

Paul Marie Alfred Lebeau (19 December 1868 – 18 November 1959) was a French chemist. He studied at the elite École supérieure de physique et de chimie industrielles de la ville de Paris (ESPCI). Together with his doctoral advisor Henri Moissan he was working on fluorine chemistry discovering several new compounds, like bromine trifluoride, oxygen difluoride, selenium tetrafluoride and sulfur hexafluoride.

In 1899, he was able to obtain pure beryllium by electrolysis sodium fluoroberyllate (Na_{2}[BeF_{2}]).

In World War I, he improved the gas mask design used by the French army.

== Biography ==
An engineer (class of 1888) from the École supérieure de physique et de chimie industrielles de la ville de Paris (now ESPCI ParisTech), Paul Lebeau worked in Alexandre Étard laboratory, where he studied the analysis of copper and free halogens. He joined Henri Moissan’s laboratory in 1889 and later became head of his laboratory at the Sorbonne. In 1908, Paul Lebeau was appointed to the chair of toxicology at the École supérieure de pharmacie de Paris. In this capacity, he contributed to the development of protective measures against German combat gases during World War I by improving the effectiveness of gas masks . After the war, he was appointed advisor to the Ministry of National Defense and continued his research on protection. In 1918, he succeeded Charles Moureu, who had been appointed professor at the Collège de France, to the chair of chemical pharmacy at the School of Pharmacy. He held this position until his retirement in 1939.

He is buried at Père Lachaise Cemetery (44th section).

== Bibliography ==
- "Paul Lebeau".
