= Étard reaction =

Oxidisation reaction

Named after	Alexandre Léon Étard
Reaction type	Organic redox reaction

Identifiers
Organic Chemistry Portal	étard-reaction

The Étard reaction is a chemical reaction that involves the direct oxidation of an aromatic or heterocyclic bound methyl group to an aldehyde using chromyl chloride. For example, toluene can be oxidized to benzaldehyde.

It is named for the French chemist Alexandre Léon Étard (5 January 1852, Alençon – 1 May 1910).

== Reaction mechanism ==
The reaction mechanism proceeds via an ene reaction with chromyl chloride, forming the precipitated Étard complex. The Étard complex is then decomposed by a [2,3] sigmatropic rearrangement under reducing conditions to prevent further oxidation to a carboxylic acid. Reducing conditions for the decomposition of the Étard complex are provided by saturated aqueous sodium sulphite. Typical solvents for the reaction include carbon disulfide, dichloromethane, chloroform, and carbon tetrachloride, with carbon tetrachloride being the most common. To obtain a highly purified aldehyde product, the Étard complex precipitate is often purified before decomposition in order to prevent reaction with any unreacted reagent. The reaction is normally carried out for a few days to several weeks and the yields are high.

The Etard reaction

== Limitations ==
The Étard reaction is most commonly used as a relatively easy method of converting toluene into benzaldehyde. Obtaining specific aldehyde products from reagents other than toluene tends to be difficult due to rearrangements. For example, n-propylbenzene is oxidized to propiophenone, benzyl methyl ketone, and several chlorinated products, with benzyl methyl ketone being the major product. Another example arises from the Étard reaction of trans-decalin which results in a mixture of trans-9-decalol, spiro [4.5]decan-6-one, trans-1-decalone, cis-1-decalone, 9,10-octal-1-one, and 1-tetralone.

Other oxidation reagents like potassium permanganate or potassium dichromate oxidize to the more stable carboxylic acids.

== Uses ==
Oxidation of toluene to benzaldehyde is quite a useful conversion. Benzaldehyde is routinely used for its almond flavor. The aldehyde is comparatively reactive and readily participates in aldol condensations. Benzaldehyde can serve as a precursor for various compounds, including dyes, perfumes, and pharmaceuticals. For example, the first step in the synthesis of ephedrine is condensation of benzaldehyde with nitroethane. Additionally, benzaldehyde is instrumental in the synthesis of phentermine. Unlike other oxidising agents (like KMnO_{4} or CrO_{3} etc.), chromyl chloride does not oxidise aldehyde to carboxylic acid.
