= Tellurium hexafluoride =

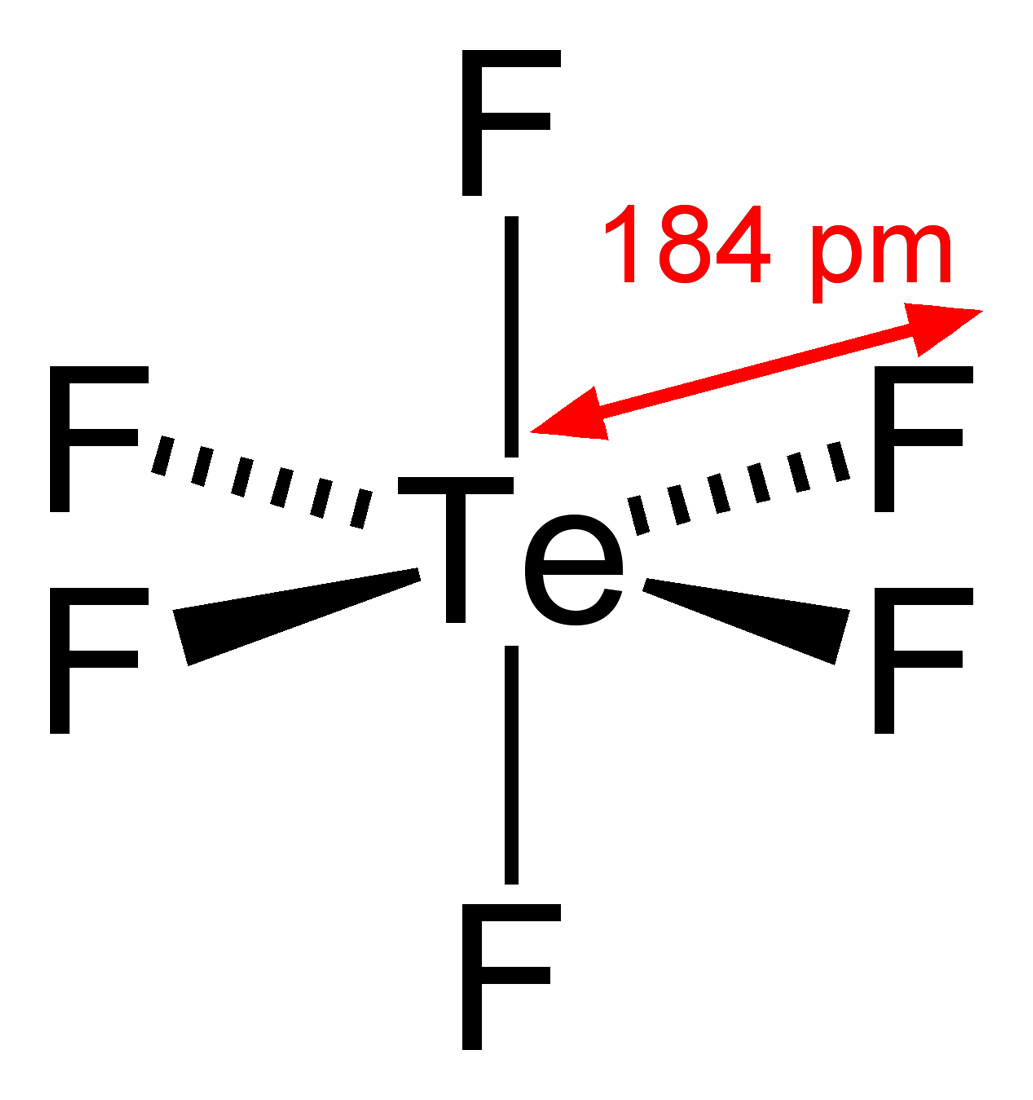
Structure and dimensions of the molecule
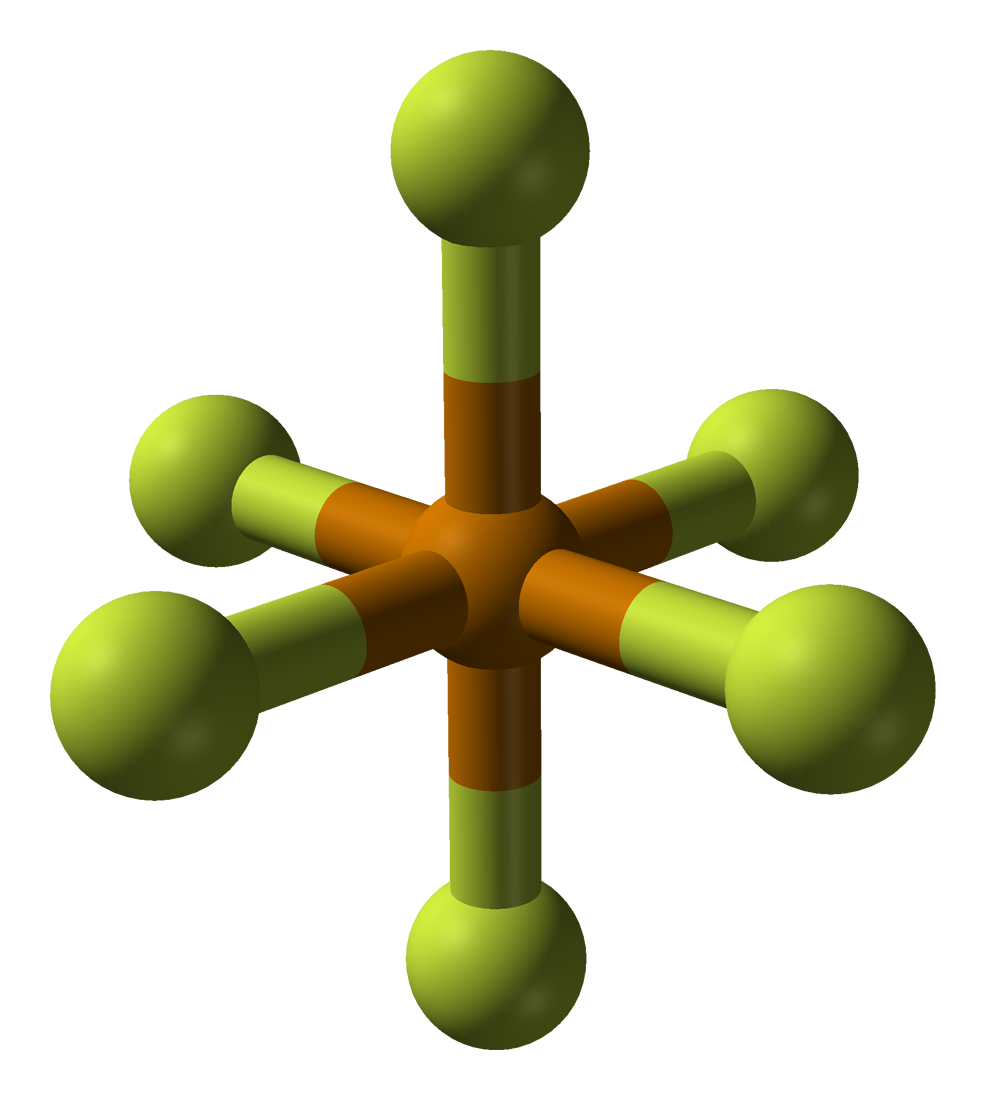
Ball-and-stick model of the molecule

Identifiers
CAS Number	7783-80-4
3D model (JSmol)	Interactive image
ChEBI	CHEBI:30469
ChemSpider	22965
ECHA InfoCard	100.029.115
EC Number	232-027-0
Gmelin Reference	2601
PubChem CID	24559
RTECS number	WY2800000
UNII	JWI7143IXR
UN number	2195 (TELLURIUM HEXAFLUORIDE)
CompTox Dashboard (EPA)	DTXSID20893077
- InChI: Key: NNCGPRGCYAWTAF-UHFFFAOYSA-N; InChI=1S/F6Te/c1-7(2,3,4,5)6
- SMILES: F[Te](F)(F)(F)(F)F

Properties
Chemical formula	TeF_{6}
Molar mass	241.590 g/mol
Appearance	colorless gas
Odor	repulsive
Density	0.0106 g/cm^{3} (-10 °C); 4.006 g/cm^{3} (-191 °C)
Melting point	−38.9 °C (−38.0 °F; 234.2 K)
Boiling point	−37.6 °C (−35.7 °F; 235.6 K)
Solubility in water	decomposes
Vapor pressure	>1 atm (20°C)
Magnetic susceptibility (χ)	−66.0·10^{−6} cm^{3}/mol
Refractive index (n_{D})	1.0009

Structure
Crystal structure	Orthorhombic, oP28
Space group	Pnma, No. 62
Coordination geometry	octahedral (O_{h})
Dipole moment	0

Thermochemistry
Heat capacity (C)	117.6 J/(mol K)
Std enthalpy of formation (Δ_{f}H^{⦵}_{298})	−1318 kJ/mol

Hazards
- Lethal dose or concentration (LD, LC)
LC_{Lo} (lowest published)	5 ppm (rat, 4 hr); 5 ppm (mouse, 1 hr); 5 ppm (rabbit, 4 hr); 5 ppm (guinea pig, 4 hr)
- NIOSH (US health exposure limits)
PEL (Permissible)	TWA 0.02 ppm (0.2 mg/m^{3})
REL (Recommended)	TWA 0.02 ppm (0.2 mg/m^{3})
IDLH (Immediate danger)	1 ppm
- Except where otherwise noted, data are given for materials in their standard state (at 25 °C [77 °F], 100 kPa). verify (what is ?) Infobox references

Tellurium hexafluoride is the inorganic compound of tellurium and fluorine with the chemical formula TeF_{6}. It is a colorless and highly toxic gas with an unpleasant odor.

== Preparation ==
Tellurium hexafluoride can be prepared by treating tellurium with fluorine gas at 150 °C. It can also be prepared by fluorination of TeO_{3} with bromine trifluoride. Upon heating, TeF_{4} disproportionates to give TeF_{6} and Te.

== Properties ==
Tellurium hexafluoride is a highly symmetric octahedral molecule. Its physical properties resemble those of the hexafluorides of sulfur and selenium. It is less volatile, however, due to the increase in polarizability. At temperatures below −38 °C, tellurium hexafluoride condenses to a volatile white solid.

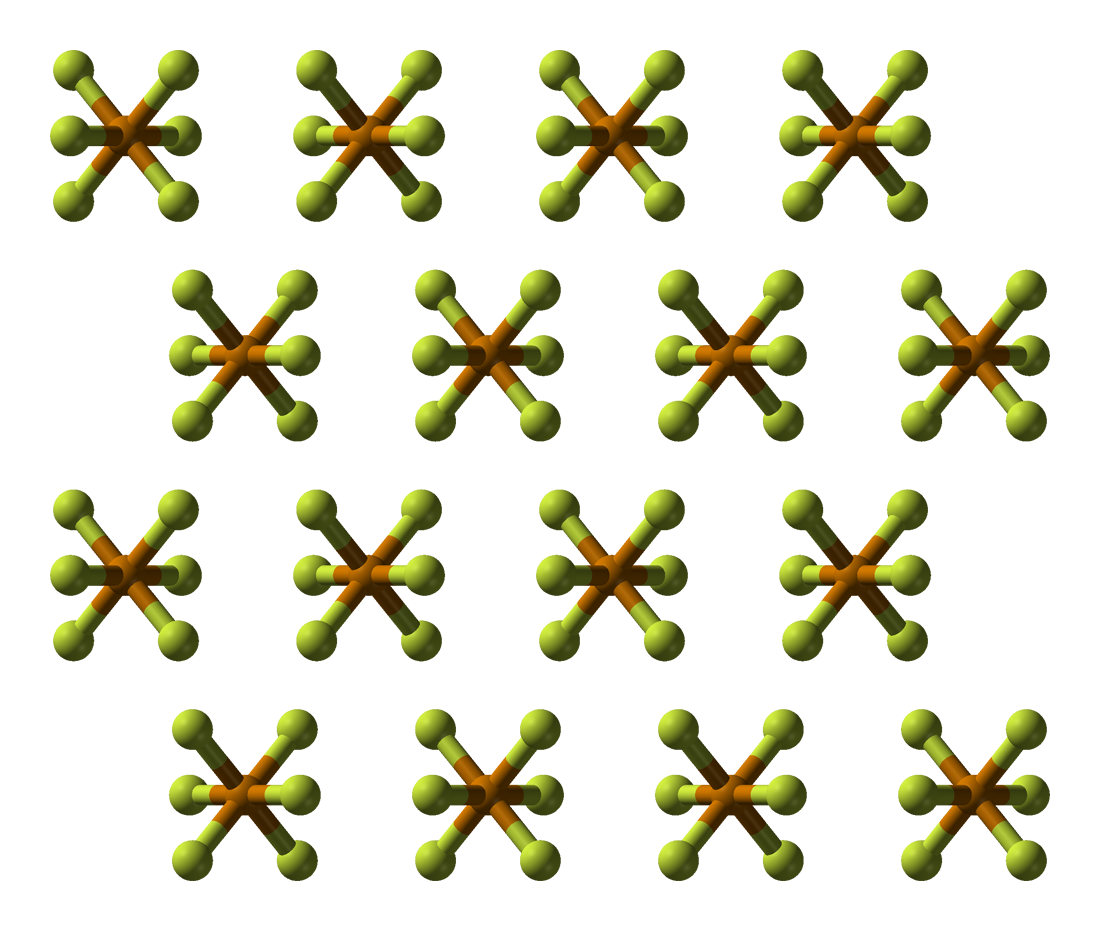
Ball-and-stick model of the crystal structure

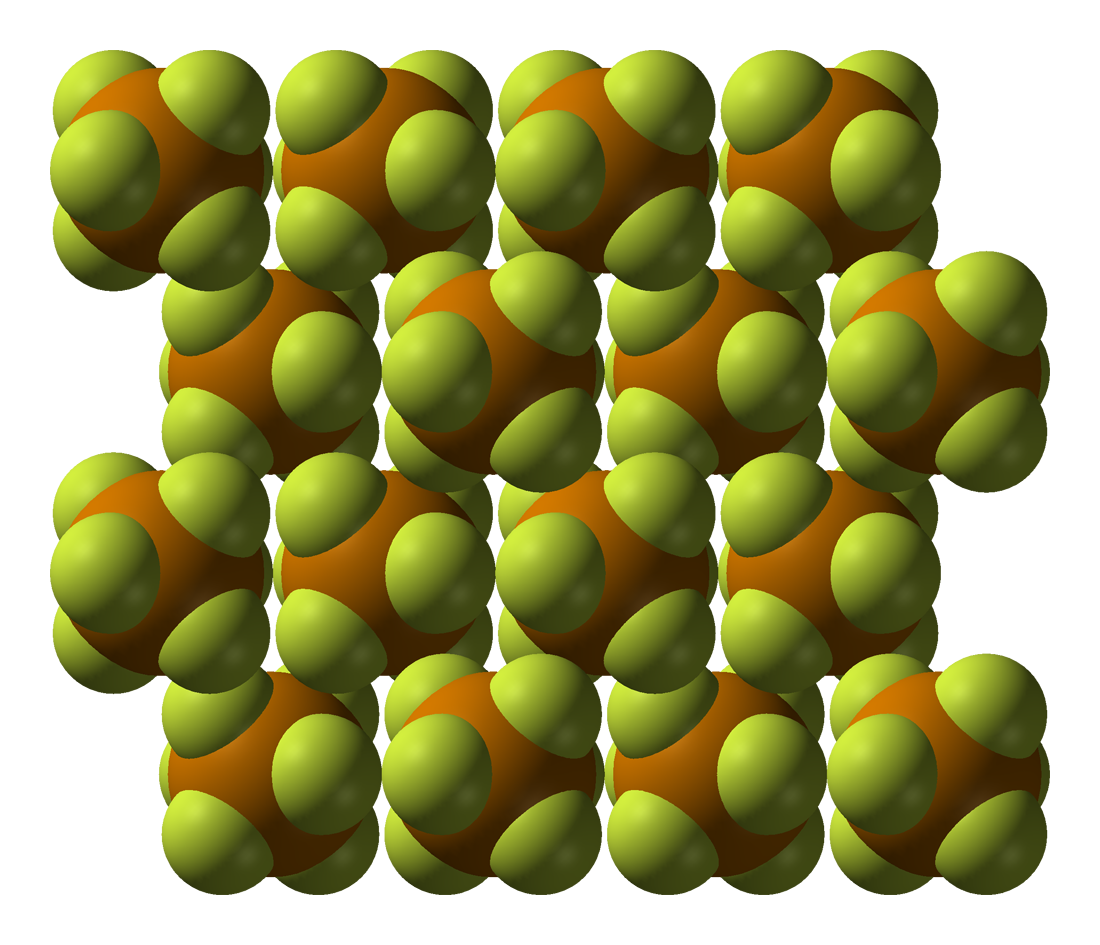
Space-filling model of the crystal structure

== Reactivity ==
Tellurium hexafluoride is much more chemically reactive than SF_{6}. For example, TeF_{6} slowly hydrolyzes to Te(OH)_{6}:

TeF_{6} + 6 H_{2}O → Te(OH)_{6} + 6 HF

Treatment of tellurium hexafluoride with tetramethylammonium fluoride (Me_{4}NF) gives, sequentially, the hepta- and octafluorides:

TeF_{6} + Me_{4}NF → Me_{4}NTeF_{7}
Me_{4}NTeF_{7} + Me_{4}NF → (Me_{4}N)_{2}TeF_{8}

== Further sources ==
- W.C. Cooper, Tellurium, Van Nostrand Reinhold Company, New York, USA, 1971.
- K.W. Bagnall, The Chemistry of Selenium, Tellurium and Polonium, Elsevier Publishing, New York, 1966.
- R.T. Sanderson, Chemical Periodicity, Reinhold, New York, USA, 1960.
- F. A. Cotton, G. Wilkinson, C.A. Murillo, and M. Bochmann; Advanced Inorganic Chemistry, John Wiley & Sons, 1999.
- G.J. Hathaway, N.H. Proctor, Chemical Hazards of the Workplace, 5th edition, Wiley-Interscience, New Jersey, 2004.
