= Selenium hexafluoride =

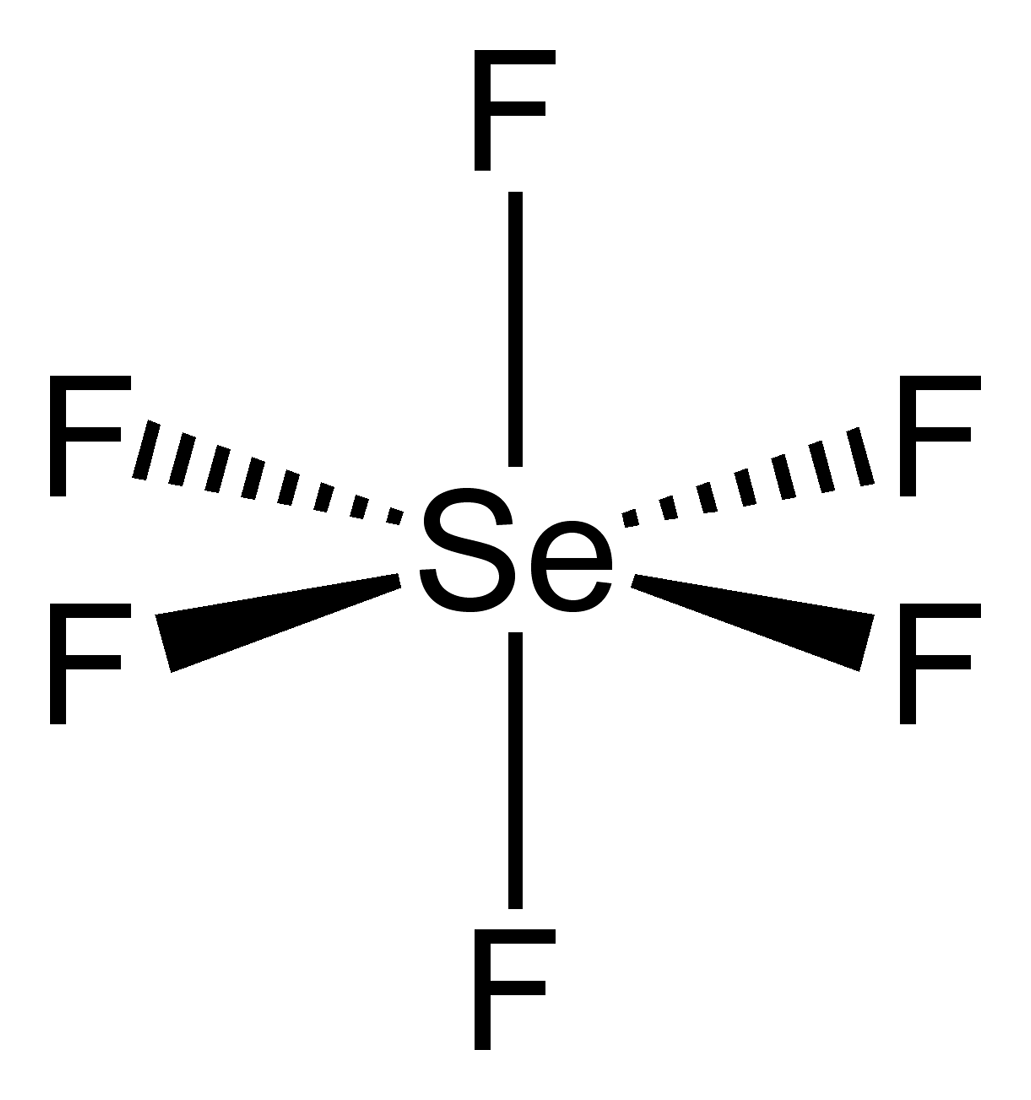

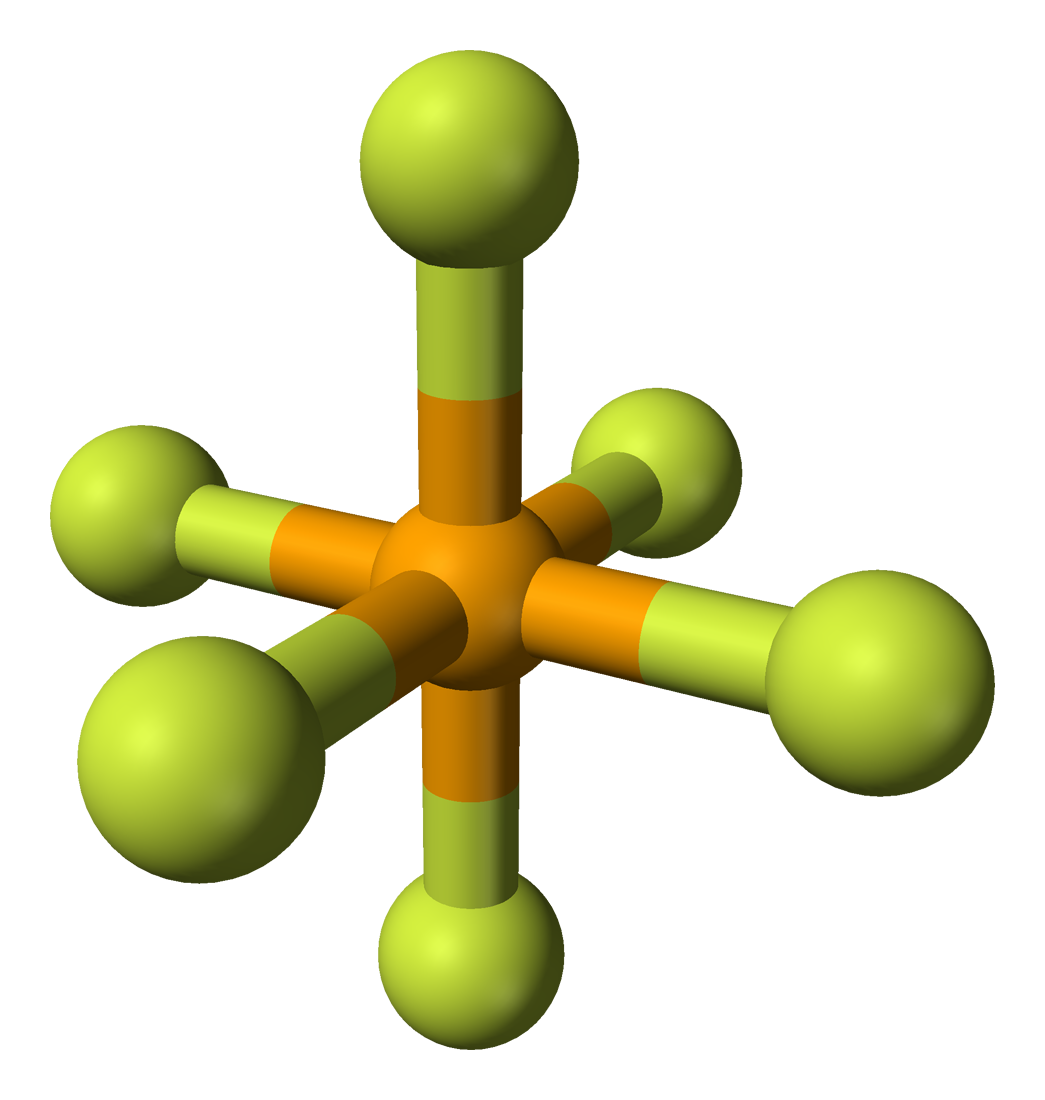

Names
- IUPAC name Selenium hexafluoride
- Other names Selenium(VI) fluoride, Selenium fluoride

Identifiers
CAS Number	7783-79-1
3D model (JSmol)	Interactive image
ChemSpider	22964
ECHA InfoCard	100.149.506
PubChem CID	24558
RTECS number	VS9450000
UNII	H91D37I668
CompTox Dashboard (EPA)	DTXSID00999041
- InChI: InChI=1S/F6Se/c1-7(2,3,4,5)6 Key: LMDVZDMBPZVAIV-UHFFFAOYSA-N; InChI=1S/F6Se/c1-7(2,3,4,5)6 Key: LMDVZDMBPZVAIV-UHFFFAOYAP
- SMILES: F[Se](F)(F)(F)(F)F

Properties
Chemical formula	SeF_{6}
Molar mass	192.9534 g/mol
Appearance	colourless gas
Density	7.887 g/L
Melting point	−39 °C (−38 °F; 234 K)
Boiling point	−34.5 °C (−30.1 °F; 238.7 K) sublimes
Solubility in water	insoluble
Vapor pressure	>1 atm (20°C)
Magnetic susceptibility (χ)	−51.0·10^{−6} cm^{3}/mol
Refractive index (n_{D})	1.895

Structure
Crystal structure	Orthorhombic, oP28
Space group	Pnma, No. 62
Coordination geometry	octahedral (O_{h})
Dipole moment	0

Thermochemistry
Std enthalpy of formation (Δ_{f}H^{⦵}_{298})	−1030 kJ/mol

Hazards
- Occupational safety and health (OHS/OSH)
Main hazards	toxic, corrosive
NFPA 704 (fire diamond)	3 0 0
- Lethal dose or concentration (LD, LC)
LC_{Lo} (lowest published)	10 ppm (rat, 1 hr); 10 ppm (mouse, 1 hr); 10 ppm (guinea pig, 1 hr)
- NIOSH (US health exposure limits)
PEL (Permissible)	TWA 0.05 ppm (0.4 mg/m^{3})
REL (Recommended)	TWA 0.05 ppm
IDLH (Immediate danger)	2 ppm
- Except where otherwise noted, data are given for materials in their standard state (at 25 °C [77 °F], 100 kPa). verify (what is ?) Infobox references

Selenium hexafluoride is the inorganic compound with the formula SeF_{6}. It is a very toxic colourless gas described as having a "repulsive" odor. It is not widely encountered and has no commercial applications.

== Structure, preparation, and reactions ==
SeF_{6} has octahedral molecular geometry with an Se−F bond length of 168.8 pm. In terms of bonding, it is hypervalent.

SeF_{6} can be prepared from the elements. It also forms by the reaction of bromine trifluoride (BrF_{3}) with selenium dioxide. The crude product can be purified by sublimation.

The relative reactivity of the hexafluorides of S, Se, and Te follows the order TeF_{6} > SeF_{6} > SF_{6}, the latter being completely inert toward hydrolysis until high temperatures. SeF_{6} also resists hydrolysis. The gas can be passed through 10% NaOH or KOH without change, but reacts with gaseous ammonia at 200 °C.

== Safety ==
Although selenium hexafluoride is quite inert and slow to hydrolyze, it is toxic even at low concentrations, especially by longer exposure. In the U.S., OSHA and ACGIH standards for selenium hexafluoride exposure is an upper limit of 0.05 ppm in air averaged over an eight-hour work shift. Additionally, selenium hexafluoride is designated as IDLH chemical with a maximum allowed exposure limit of 2 ppm.
