= Henri Moissan =

French chemist and pharmacist (1852–1907)

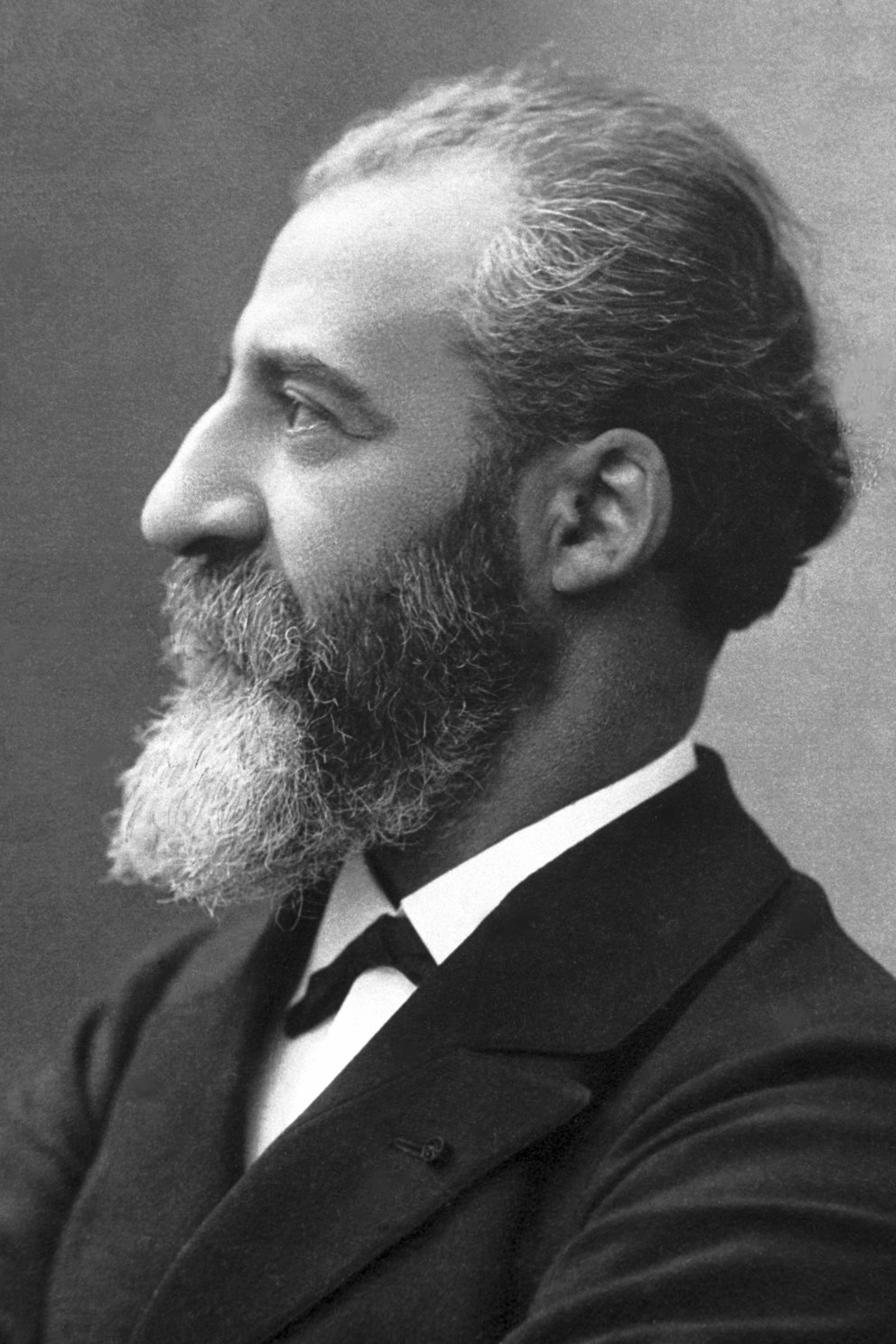
- Moissan in 1906
- Born: Ferdinand Frédéric Henri Moissan; 28 September 1852; Paris, France
- Died: 20 February 1907 (aged 54); Paris, France
- Known for: Isolation of fluorine Disilane; Moissanite; Strontium carbide
- Spouse: Marie Léonie Lugan Moissan (m. 1882; 1 child)
- Awards: Davy Medal (1896); Elliott Cresson Medal (1898); Nobel Prize for Chemistry (1906)
- Scientific career
- Fields: Chemistry
- Workplaces: Sorbonne
- Thesis: Sur les oxydes métalliques de la famille du fer (1880)
- Doctoral advisor: Henri Debray
- Doctoral students: Paul Lebeau; Maurice Meslans

Signature
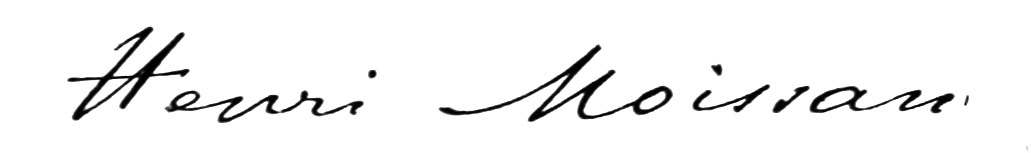

Ferdinand Frédéric Henri Moissan (French pronunciation: [fɛʁdinɑ̃ fʁedeʁik ɑ̃ʁi mwasɑ̃]; 28 September 1852 – 20 February 1907) was a French chemist and pharmacist who won the 1906 Nobel Prize in Chemistry for his work in isolating fluorine from its compounds. (Note: He defeated Dmitri Mendeleev of Russia by a margin of just one vote.) Among his other contributions, Moissan discovered moissanite and contributed to the development of the electric arc furnace. Moissan was one of the original members of the International Atomic Weights Committee.

== Biography ==
=== Early life and education ===
Moissan was born in Paris on 28 September 1852, the son of a minor officer of the Eastern Railway Company, Francis Ferdinand Moissan, and a seamstress, Joséphine Améraldine (née Mitel). In 1864 they moved to Meaux, where he attended the local school. During this time, Moissan became an apprentice clockmaker. However, in 1870, Moissan and his family moved back to Paris due to war against Prussia. Moissan was unable to receive the grade universitaire necessary to attend university. After spending a year in the army, he enrolled at the Ecole Superieure de Pharmacie de Paris..He was of Jewish descent and practiced the Catholic faith.

=== Scientific career ===
Moissan became a trainee in pharmacy in 1871 and in 1872 he began working for a chemist in Paris, where he was able to save a person poisoned with arsenic. He decided to study chemistry and began first in the laboratory of Edmond Frémy at the Musée d’Histoire Naturelle, and later in that of Pierre Paul Dehérain at the École Pratique des Haute Études. Dehérain persuaded him to pursue an academic career. He passed the baccalauréat, which was necessary to study at university, in 1874 after an earlier failed attempt. He also became qualified as first-class pharmacist at the École Supérieure de Pharmacie in 1879, and received his doctoral degree there in 1880.

He soon climbed through the ranks of the School of Pharmacy, and was appointed Assistant Lecturer, Senior Demonstrator, and finally Professor of Toxicology by 1886. He took the Chair of Inorganic Chemistry in 1899. The following year, he succeeded Louis Joseph Troost as Professor of Inorganic Chemistry at the Sorbonne. During his time in Paris he became a friend of the chemist Alexandre Léon Étard and the botanist Vasque. His marriage, to Léonie Lugan, took place in 1882. They had a son in 1885, named Louis Ferdinand Henri.

=== Death ===
Moissan died suddenly in Paris in February 1907, shortly after his return from receiving the Nobel Prize in Stockholm. His death was attributed to an acute case of appendicitis, however, there is speculation that repeated exposure to fluorine and carbon monoxide also contributed to his death.

=== Awards and honors ===
During his extensive career, Moissan authored more than three hundred publications, won the 1906 Nobel Prize in Chemistry for the first isolation of fluorine, in addition to the Prix Lucaze, the Davy Medal, the Hofmann Medal, and the Elliott Cresson Medal. He was elected fellow of the Royal Society and The Chemical Society of London, served on the International Atomic Weights Committee and made a commandeur in the Légion d'honneur. He was elected to honorary membership of the Manchester Literary and Philosophical Society, 1892 described as Professor at the Ecole Supérieure de Pharmacie. 7, Rue Vauguelin, Paris.

== Research ==
Moissan published his first scientific paper, about carbon dioxide and oxygen metabolism in plants, with Dehérain in 1874. He left plant physiology and then turned towards inorganic chemistry; subsequently his research on pyrophoric iron was well received by the two most prominent French inorganic chemists of that time, Henri Étienne Sainte-Claire Deville and Jules Henri Debray. After Moissan received his Ph.D. on cyanogen and its reactions to form cyanures in 1880, his friend Landrine offered him a position at an analytic laboratory.

=== Isolation of fluorine ===
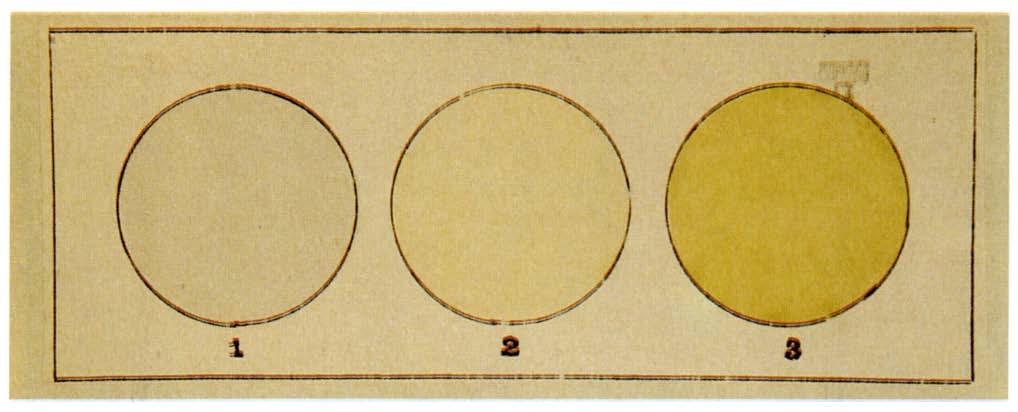
Moissan's 1892 observation of the color of fluorine gas (2), compared to air (1) and chlorine (3)

During the 1880s, Moissan focused on fluorine chemistry and especially the production of fluorine itself. The existence of the element had been well known for many years, but all attempts to isolate it had failed, and some experimenters had died in the attempt. He had no laboratory of his own, but borrowed lab space from others, including Charles Friedel. There he had access to a strong battery consisting of 90 Bunsen cells which made it possible to observe a gas produced by the electrolysis of molten arsenic trichloride; the gas was reabsorbed by the arsenic trichloride.

Moissan eventually succeeded in isolating fluorine in 1886 by the electrolysis of a solution of potassium hydrogen difluoride (KHF_{2}) in liquid hydrogen fluoride (HF). The mixture was necessary because hydrogen fluoride is a nonconductor. The device was built with platinum-iridium electrodes in a platinum holder and the apparatus was cooled to −50 °C. The result was the complete separation of the hydrogen produced at the negative electrode from the fluorine produced at the positive one, first achieved on 26 June 1886. This remains the current standard method for commercial fluorine production. The French Academy of Science sent three representatives, Marcellin Berthelot, Henri Debray, and Edmond Frémy, to verify the results, but Moissan was unable to reproduce them, owing to the absence from the hydrogen fluoride of traces of potassium fluoride present in the previous experiments. After resolving the problem and demonstrating the production of fluorine several times, he was awarded a prize of 10,000 francs. For the first successful isolation, he was awarded the 1906 Nobel Prize in Chemistry. Following his grand achievement, his research focused on characterizing fluorine's chemistry. He discovered numerous fluorine compounds, such as (together with Paul Lebeau) sulfur hexafluoride in 1901.

==== Further studies ====
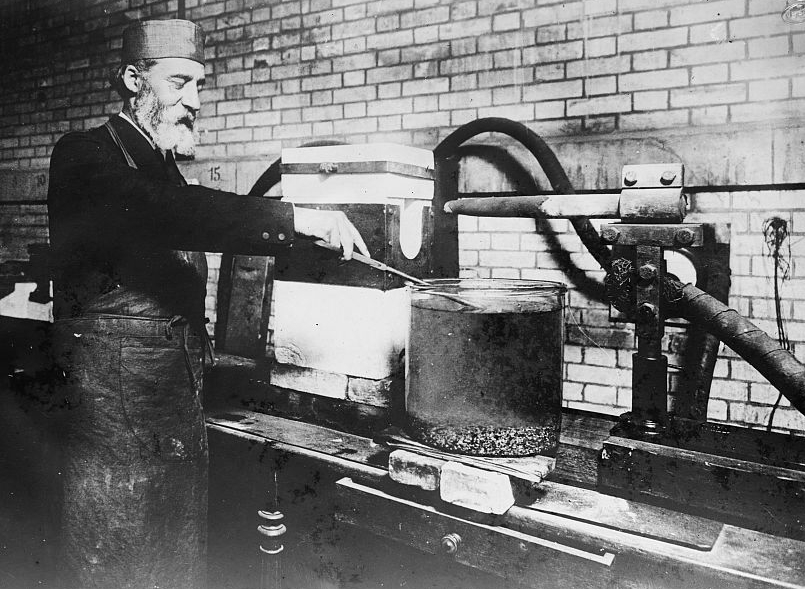
Moissan attempting to create synthetic diamonds using an electric arc furnace

Moissan contributed to the development of the electric arc furnace, which opened several paths to developing and preparing new compounds, and attempted to use pressure to produce synthetic diamonds from the more common form of carbon. He also used the furnace to synthesize the borides and carbides of numerous elements. Calcium carbide was a noticeable accomplishment as this paved the way for the development of the chemistry of acetylene. In 1893, Moissan began studying fragments of a meteorite found in Meteor Crater near Diablo Canyon in Arizona. In these fragments he discovered minute quantities of a new mineral and, after extensive research, Moissan concluded that this mineral was made of silicon carbide. In 1905, this mineral was named moissanite, in his honor. In 1903 Moissan was elected member of the International Atomic Weights Committee where he served until his death.

== See also ==
- List of Jewish Nobel laureates
- Tracy Hall - Researchers of Synthetic Diamonds
