= Sulfur hexafluoride =

Chemical compound and greenhouse gas

Skeletal formula of sulfur hexafluoride with assorted dimensions
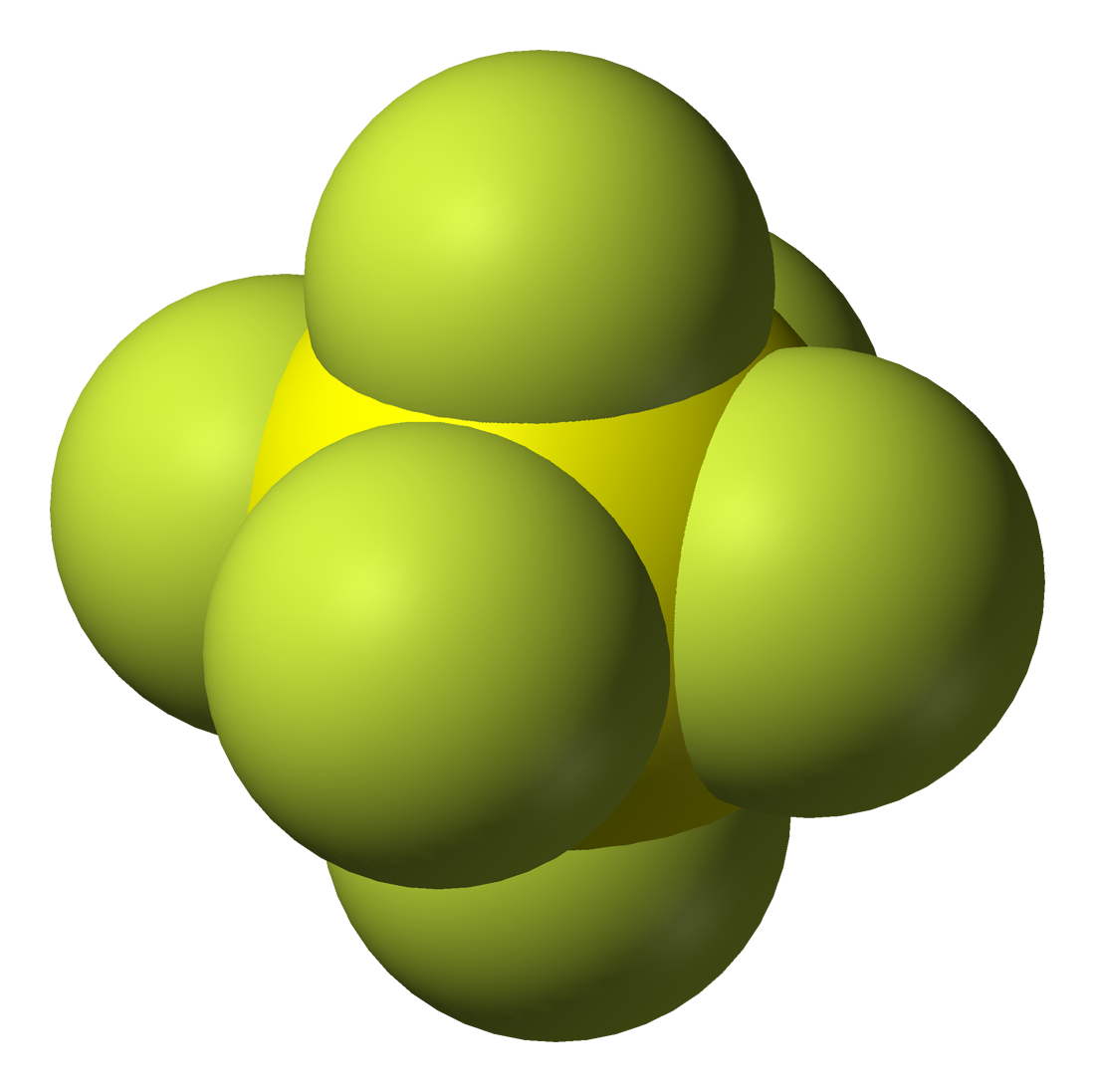
Spacefill model of sulfur hexafluoride
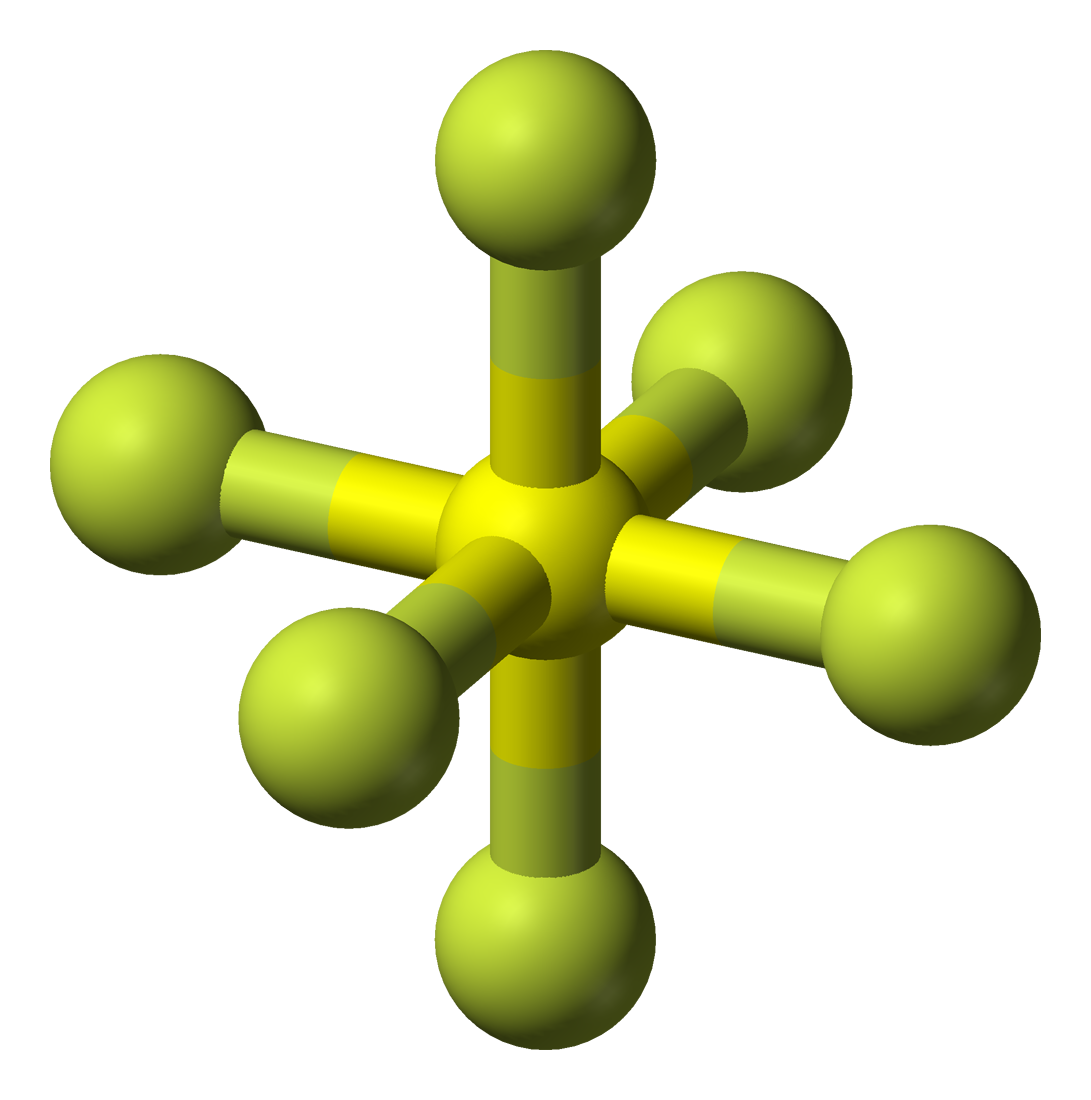
- Ball and stick model of sulfur hexafluoride

Names
- IUPAC name Sulfur hexafluoride
- Systematic IUPAC name Hexafluoro-λ^{6}-sulfane
- Other names: Elagas; Esaflon; Sulfur(VI) fluoride; Sulfuric fluoride

Identifiers
CAS Number	2551-62-4
3D model (JSmol)	Interactive image
ChEBI	CHEBI:30496
ChemSpider	16425
ECHA InfoCard	100.018.050
EC Number	219-854-2
Gmelin Reference	2752
KEGG	D05962
MeSH	Sulfur+hexafluoride
PubChem CID	17358
RTECS number	WS4900000
UNII	WS7LR3I1D6
UN number	1080
CompTox Dashboard (EPA)	DTXSID8029656
- InChI: InChI=1S/F6S/c1-7(2,3,4,5)6 Key: SFZCNBIFKDRMGX-UHFFFAOYSA-N
- SMILES: FS(F)(F)(F)(F)F

Properties
Chemical formula	SF_{6}
Molar mass	146.05 g·mol^{−1}
Appearance	Colorless gas
Odor	odorless
Density	6.17 g/L
Melting point	−50.7 °C (−59.3 °F; 222.5 K) (at or above 2,26 bar air pressure - at normal air pressure it sublimes instead)
Boiling point	−68.25 °C (−90.85 °F; 204.90 K) (sublimes)
Critical point (T, P)	45.51±0.1 °C, 3.749±0.01 MPa
Solubility in water	0.003% (25 °C)
Solubility	slightly soluble in water, very soluble in ethanol, hexane, benzene
Vapor pressure	2.9 MPa (at 21.1 °C)
Magnetic susceptibility (χ)	−44.0×10^{−6} cm^{3}/mol
Thermal conductivity	13.45 mW/(m·K) at 25 °C; 11.42 mW/(m·K) at 0 °C
Viscosity	15.23 μPa·s

Structure
Crystal structure	Orthorhombic, oP28
Space group	O_{h}
Coordination geometry	Orthogonal hexagonal
Molecular shape	Octahedral
Dipole moment	0 D

Thermochemistry
Heat capacity (C)	0.097 kJ/(mol·K) (constant pressure)
Std molar entropy (S^{⦵}_{298})	292 J·mol^{−1}·K^{−1}
Std enthalpy of formation (Δ_{f}H^{⦵}_{298})	−1209 kJ·mol^{−1}

Pharmacology
ATC code	V08DA05 (WHO)
License data	EU EMA: by sulphur hexafluoride

Hazards
- GHS labelling
Pictograms	(GHS04: Compressed Gas)
Signal word	Warning
Hazard statements	H280
Precautionary statements	P403
NFPA 704 (fire diamond)	1 0 0 SA
- NIOSH (US health exposure limits)
PEL (Permissible)	TWA 1000 ppm (6000 mg/m^{3})
REL (Recommended)	TWA 1000 ppm (6000 mg/m^{3})
IDLH (Immediate danger)	N.D.
Safety data sheet (SDS)	External MSDS

Related compounds
Related sulfur fluorides	Disulfur decafluoride; Sulfur tetrafluoride
Related compounds	Selenium hexafluoride; Tellurium hexafluoride; Polonium hexafluoride; Sulfuryl fluoride; Thionyl tetrafluoride; Sulfur chloride pentafluoride; Pentafluorosulfur hypofluorite; Trifluoromethylsulfur pentafluoride
- Except where otherwise noted, data are given for materials in their standard state (at 25 °C [77 °F], 100 kPa). verify (what is ?) Infobox references

Sulfur hexafluoride or sulphur hexafluoride (British spelling) is an inorganic compound with the formula SF_{6}. It is a colorless, odorless, non-flammable, and non-toxic gas. SF_{6} has an octahedral geometry, consisting of six fluorine atoms attached to a central sulfur atom. It is a hypervalent molecule.

Typical for a nonpolar gas, SF_{6} is poorly soluble in water but quite soluble in nonpolar organic solvents. It has a density of 6.12 g/L at sea level conditions, considerably higher than the density of air (1.225 g/L). It is generally stored and transported as a liquefied compressed gas.

SF_{6} has 23,500 times greater global warming potential (GWP) than CO_{2} as a greenhouse gas (over a 100-year time horizon), but exists in relatively minor concentrations in the atmosphere. Its GWP is 35,000 on a 500-year time horizon, compared with CO_{2}. Its concentration in Earth's troposphere reached 12.06 parts per trillion (ppt) in February 2025, rising at 0.4 ppt/year. The increase since 1980 is driven in large part by the expanding electric power sector, including fugitive emissions from banks of SF_{6} gas contained in its medium- and high-voltage switchgear. Uses in magnesium, aluminium, and electronics manufacturing also hastened atmospheric growth.

== Synthesis and reactions ==
Sulfur hexafluoride on Earth exists primarily as a synthetic industrial gas, but has also been found to occur naturally.

SF_{6} can be prepared from the elements through exposure of S_{8} to F_{2}. This was the method used by the discoverers Henri Moissan and Paul Lebeau in 1901. Some other sulfur fluorides are cogenerated, but these are removed by heating the mixture to disproportionate any S_{2}F_{10} (which is highly toxic) and then scrubbing the product with NaOH to destroy the remaining SF_{4}.

Alternatively, using bromine, sulfur hexafluoride can be synthesized from SF_{4} and CoF_{3} at lower temperatures (e.g. 100 °C), as follows:

2 CoF_{3} + SF_{4} + [Br_{2}] → SF_{6} + 2 CoF_{2} + [Br_{2}]

There are few chemical reactions for SF_{6}. A main contribution to the inertness of SF_{6} is the steric hindrance of the sulfur atom, whereas its heavier group 16 counterparts, such as SeF_{6} are more reactive than SF_{6} as a result of less steric hindrance. It does not react with molten sodium below its boiling point, but reacts exothermically with lithium. However, alkali metals react with SF_{6} in liquid ammonia to form the corresponding sulfides and fluorides:

SF_{6} + 8 Na → Na_{2}S + 6 NaF

As a result of its inertness, SF_{6} has an atmospheric lifetime of around 3200 years, and no significant environmental sinks other than the ocean.

== Applications ==
By 2000, the electrical power industry is estimated to use about 80% of the sulfur hexafluoride produced, mostly as a gaseous dielectric medium. Other main uses as of 2015 included a silicon etchant for semiconductor manufacturing, and an inert gas for the casting of magnesium.

=== Dielectric medium ===
SF_{6} is used in the electrical industry as a gaseous dielectric medium for high-voltage sulfur hexafluoride circuit breakers, gas insulated switchgear (GIS), and other electrical equipment, often replacing oil-filled circuit breakers (OCBs) that can contain harmful polychlorinated biphenyls (PCBs). SF_{6} gas under pressure is used as an insulator in GIS because it has a much higher dielectric strength than air or dry nitrogen. The high dielectric strength is a result of the gas's high electronegativity and density. This property makes it possible to significantly reduce the size of electrical gear. This makes GIS more suitable for certain purposes such as indoor placement, as opposed to air-insulated electrical gear, which takes up considerably more room.

Gas-insulated electrical gear is also more resistant to the effects of pollution and climate, as well as being more reliable in long-term operation because of its controlled operating environment. Exposure to an arc chemically breaks down SF_{6} though most of the decomposition products tend to quickly re-form SF_{6}, a process termed "self-healing". Arcing or corona can produce disulfur decafluoride (S_{2}F_{10}), a highly toxic gas, with toxicity similar to phosgene. S_{2}F_{10} was considered a potential chemical warfare agent in World War II because it does not produce lacrimation or skin irritation, thus providing little warning of exposure.

SF_{6} is also commonly encountered as a high voltage dielectric in the high voltage supplies of particle accelerators, such as Van de Graaff generators and Pelletrons and high voltage transmission electron microscopes.

Alternatives to SF_{6} as a dielectric gas include several fluoroketones. Compact GIS technology that combines vacuum switching with clean air insulation has been introduced for a subset of applications up to 420 kV.

=== Medical use ===
SF_{6} is used to provide a tamponade or plug of a retinal hole in retinal detachment repair operations in the form of a gas bubble. It is inert in the vitreous chamber. The bubble initially doubles its volume in 36 hours due to oxygen and nitrogen entering it, before being absorbed in the blood in 10–14 days.

SF_{6} is used as a contrast agent for ultrasound imaging. Sulfur hexafluoride microbubbles are administered in solution through injection into a peripheral vein. These microbubbles enhance the visibility of blood vessels to ultrasound. This application has been used to examine the vascularity of tumours. It remains visible in the blood for 3 to 8 minutes, and is exhaled by the lungs.

=== Tracer compound ===
Sulfur hexafluoride was the tracer gas used in the first roadway air dispersion model calibration; this research program was sponsored by the U.S. Environmental Protection Agency and conducted in Sunnyvale, California on U.S. Highway 101. Gaseous SF_{6} is used as a tracer gas in short-term experiments of ventilation efficiency in buildings and indoor enclosures, and for determining infiltration rates. Two major factors recommend its use: its concentration can be measured with satisfactory accuracy at very low concentrations, and the Earth's atmosphere has a negligible concentration of SF_{6}.

Sulfur hexafluoride was used as a non-toxic test gas in an experiment at St John's Wood tube station in London, United Kingdom on 25 March 2007. The gas was released throughout the station, and monitored as it drifted around. The purpose of the experiment, which had been announced earlier in March by the Secretary of State for Transport Douglas Alexander, was to investigate how toxic gas might spread throughout London Underground stations and buildings during a terrorist attack.

Sulfur hexafluoride is also routinely used as a tracer gas in laboratory fume hood containment testing. The gas is used in the final stage of ASHRAE 110 fume hood qualification. A plume of gas is generated inside of the fume hood and a battery of tests are performed while a gas analyzer arranged outside of the hood samples for SF_{6} to verify the containment properties of the fume hood.

It has been used successfully as a transient tracer in oceanography to study diapycnal mixing and air-sea gas exchange. The concentration of sulfur hexafluoride in seawater (typically on the order of femtomoles per kilogram) has been classified by the international oceanography community as a "level one" measurement, denoting the highest priority data for observing ocean changes.

=== Other uses ===
- The magnesium industry used SF_{6} as an inert "cover gas" to prevent oxidation during casting, and other processes including smelting. Once the largest user, consumption has declined greatly with capture and recycling. At present this use is forbidden.
- Insulated glazing windows have used it as a filler to improve their thermal and acoustic insulation performance. At present this use is forbidden.
- SF_{6} plasma is used in the semiconductor industry as an etchant in processes such as deep reactive-ion etching. A small fraction of the SF_{6} breaks down in the plasma into sulfur and fluorine, with the fluorine ions performing a chemical reaction with silicon.
- Tires filled with it take longer to deflate from diffusion through rubber due to the larger molecule size. This use is now forbidden
- Nike likewise used it to obtain a patent and to fill the cushion bags in all of their "Air"-branded shoes from 1992 to 2006. 277 tons were used during the peak in 1997. At present this use is forbidden
- The United States Navy's Mark 50 torpedo closed Rankine-cycle propulsion system is powered by sulfur hexafluoride in an exothermic reaction with solid lithium.
- Waveguides in high-power microwave systems are pressurized with it. The gas electrically insulates the waveguide, preventing internal arcing.
- Electrostatic loudspeakers have used it because of its high dielectric strength and high molecular weight.
- Disulfur decafluoride, a chemical weapon, is produced with it as a feedstock.
- For entertainment purposes, when breathed, SF_{6} causes the voice to become significantly deeper, due to its density being so much higher than air. This phenomenon is related to the more well-known effect of breathing low-density helium, which causes someone's voice to become much higher. Both of these effects should only be attempted with caution as these gases displace oxygen that the lungs are attempting to extract from the air. Sulfur hexafluoride is also mildly anesthetic.
- For science demonstrations / magic as "invisible water" since a light foil boat can be floated in a tank, as will an air-filled balloon.
- It is used for benchmark and calibration measurements in Associative and Dissociative Electron Attachment (DEA) experiments

== Greenhouse gas ==
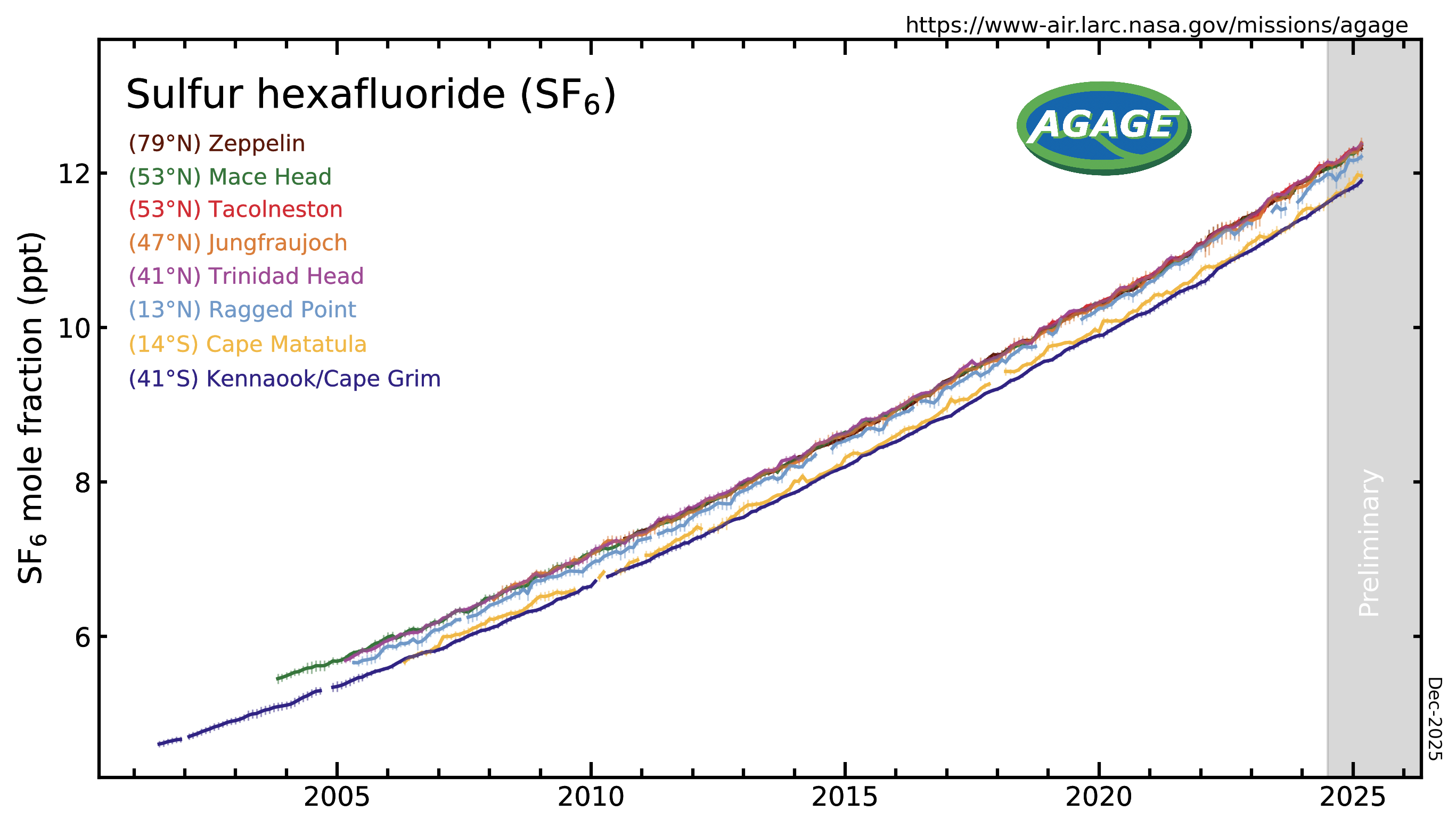
Sulfur hexafluoride (SF_{6}) measured by the Advanced Global Atmospheric Gases Experiment (AGAGE) in the lower atmosphere (troposphere) at stations around the world. Abundances are given as pollution free monthly mean mole fractions in parts-per-trillion.

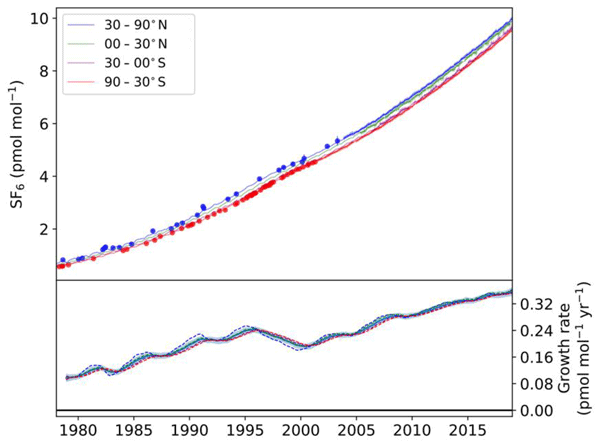
Abundance and growth rate of SF_{6} in Earth's troposphere (1978-2018).

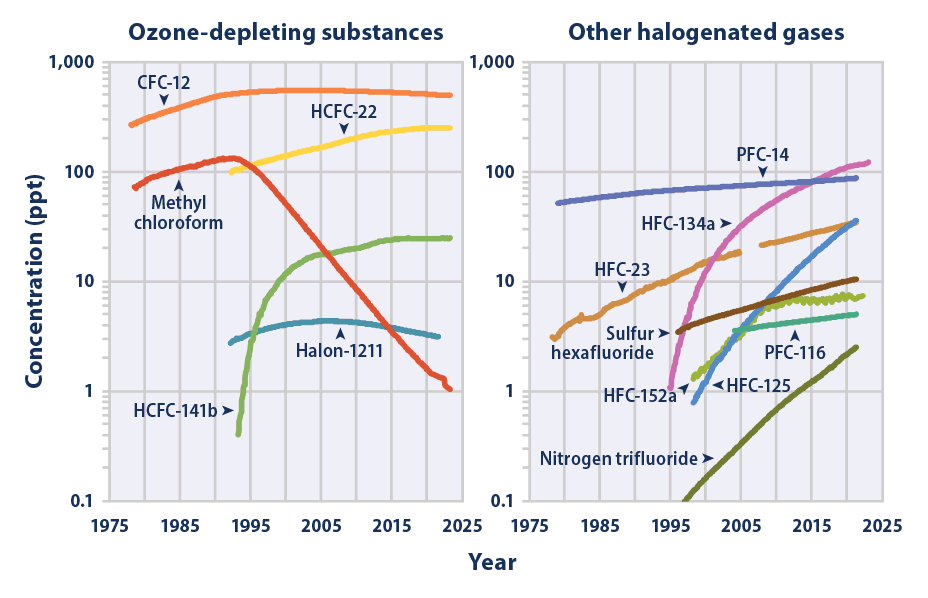
Atmospheric concentration of SF_{6} vs. similar man-made gases (right graph). Note the log scale.

According to the Intergovernmental Panel on Climate Change, SF_{6} is the most potent greenhouse gas. Its global warming potential of 23,900 times that of CO_{2} when compared over a 100-year period. Sulfur hexafluoride is inert in the troposphere and stratosphere and is extremely long-lived, with an estimated atmospheric lifetime of 800–3,200 years.

Measurements of SF_{6} show that its global average mixing ratio has increased from a steady base of about 54 parts per quadrillion prior to industrialization, to over 12 parts per trillion (ppt) as of February 2025, and is increasing by about 0.4 ppt (3.5%) per year. Average global SF_{6} concentrations increased by about 7% per year during the 1980s and 1990s, mostly as the result of its use in magnesium production, and by electrical utilities and electronics manufacturers. Given the small amounts of SF_{6} released compared to carbon dioxide, its overall individual contribution to global warming is estimated to be less than 0.2%, however the collective contribution of it and similar man-made halogenated gases has reached about 10% as of 2020. Alternatives are being tested.

In Europe, SF_{6} falls under the F-Gas directive which bans or controls its use for several applications. Since 1 January 2006, SF_{6} is banned as a tracer gas and in all applications except high-voltage switchgear. It was reported in 2013 that a three-year effort by the United States Department of Energy to identify and fix leaks at its laboratories in the United States such as the Princeton Plasma Physics Laboratory, where the gas is used as a high voltage insulator, had been productive, cutting annual leaks by 1,030 kilograms (2,280 pounds). This was done by comparing purchases with inventory, assuming the difference was leaked, then locating and fixing the leaks.

== Physiological effects and precautions ==
Sulfur hexafluoride is a nontoxic gas, but by displacing oxygen in the lungs, it also carries the risk of asphyxia if too much is inhaled. Since it is more dense than air, a substantial quantity of gas, when released, will settle in low-lying areas and present a significant risk of asphyxiation if the area is entered. That is particularly relevant to its use as an insulator in electrical equipment since workers may be in trenches or pits below equipment containing SF_{6}.

A man's voice is deepened in pitch through inhaling sulfur hexafluoride

As with all gases, the density of SF_{6} affects the resonance frequencies of the vocal tract, thus changing drastically the vocal sound qualities, or timbre, of those who inhale it. It does not affect the vibrations of the vocal folds. The density of sulfur hexafluoride is relatively high at room temperature and pressure due to the gas's large molar mass. Unlike helium, which has a molar mass of about 4 g/mol and pitches the voice up, SF_{6} has a molar mass of about 146 g/mol, and the speed of sound through the gas is about 134 m/s at room temperature, pitching the voice down. For comparison, the molar mass of air, which is about 80% nitrogen and 20% oxygen, is approximately 30 g/mol which leads to a speed of sound of 343 m/s.

Sulfur hexafluoride has an anesthetic potency slightly lower than nitrous oxide; it is classified as a mild anesthetic.

== See also ==
- Selenium hexafluoride
- Tellurium hexafluoride
- Uranium hexafluoride
- Hypervalent molecule
- Halocarbon—another group of major greenhouse gases
- Trifluoromethylsulfur pentafluoride, a similar gas
