= Maurice Meslans =

French pharmacist and chemist

- Born: 1862
- Died: 1938 (aged 75–76)
- Education: University of Nancy
- Known for: Organofluorine chemistry
- Scientific career
- Fields: Pharmacy, chemistry
- Doctoral advisor: Henri Moissan

Maurice Meslans (1862–1938) was a French pharmacist and chemist, Henri Moissan's advanced student, and a pioneer in organofluorocompounds chemistry.
