= Trifluoromethylsulfur pentafluoride =

Names
- Preferred IUPAC name Pentafluoro(trifluoromethyl)-λ^{6}-sulfane

Identifiers
CAS Number	373-80-8
3D model (JSmol)	Interactive image
ChemSpider	119988
ECHA InfoCard	100.196.530
EC Number	670-841-1
PubChem CID	136213
CompTox Dashboard (EPA)	DTXSID60190759
- InChI: InChI=1S/CF8S/c2-1(3,4)10(5,6,7,8)9 Key: QIYZKVMAFMDRTP-UHFFFAOYSA-N
- SMILES: FC(F)(F)S(F)(F)(F)(F)F

Properties
Chemical formula	CF_{8}S
Molar mass	196.06 g·mol^{−1}
Melting point	−87 °C (−125 °F; 186 K)
Boiling point	−20.4 °C (−4.7 °F; 252.8 K)

Hazards
- GHS labelling
Pictograms	(GHS06: Toxic) (GHS07: Exclamation mark) (GHS05: Corrosive)
Hazard statements	H315, H319, H335, H336
Precautionary statements	P261, P264, P271, P280, P302+P352, P304+P340, P305+P351+P338, P312, P321, P332+P313, P337+P313, P362+P364, P403+P233, P405, P410+P403, P501
NFPA 704 (fire diamond)	3 0 0 SA
- Except where otherwise noted, data are given for materials in their standard state (at 25 °C [77 °F], 100 kPa). Infobox references

Trifluoromethylsulfur pentafluoride, CF_{3}SF_{5}, is a rare greenhouse gas. It was first identified in the atmosphere in 2000. Trifluoromethylsulfur pentafluoride is considered to be one of the several "super-greenhouse gases".

== Properties ==
The chemistry of this compound is similar to that of sulfur hexafluoride (SF_{6}).

=== As a greenhouse gas ===
On a per molecule basis, it is considered to be one of the most potent greenhouse gases present in Earth's atmosphere, having a 100-year global warming potential of 17,700 times that of carbon dioxide. The chemical is predicted to have a lifetime of 800 years in the atmosphere. However, the current concentration of trifluoromethylsulfur pentafluoride remains at a level that is unlikely to measurably contribute to global warming. The presence of the gas in the atmosphere is attributed to anthropogenic sources, possibly a by-product of the manufacture of fluorochemicals, originating from reactions of SF_{6} with fluoropolymers used in electronic devices and microchips, or the formation can be associated with high voltage equipment created from SF_{6} (a breakdown product of high voltage equipment) reacting with CF_{3} to form the CF_{3}SF_{5} molecule.
