= Global warming potential =

Potential heat absorbed by a greenhouse gas

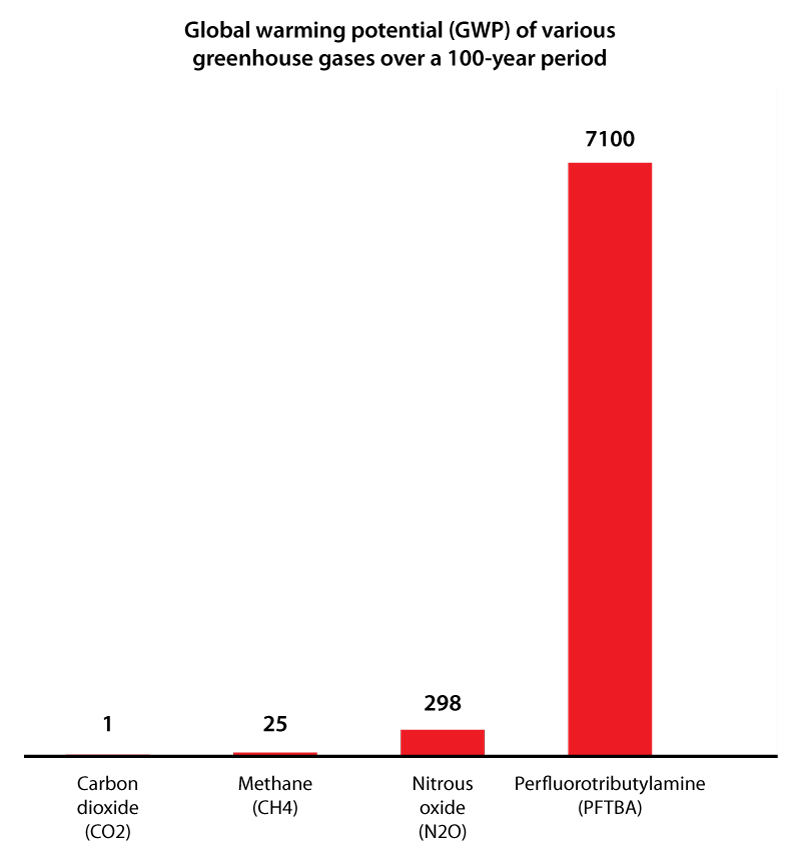
Comparison of global warming potential of three greenhouse gases over a 100-year period (GWP-100) per ton: Perfluorotributylamine (PFTBA), nitrous oxide and methane, compared to carbon dioxide (the latter is the reference value, therefore it has a GWP of one). PFTBA is here used as an example of a larger group of potent fluorinated greenhouse gases. Fluorinated hydrocarbons combined contribute about 10% to global warming.

Global warming potential (GWP) is a measure of how much heat a greenhouse gas (GHG) traps in the atmosphere over a specific time period, relative to carbon dioxide (CO_{2}). It is a dimensionless quantity expressed as a multiple of warming caused by the same mass of CO_{2}. Therefore, by definition CO_{2} has a GWP of 1. For other gases, it depends on how strongly the gas absorbs thermal radiation, how quickly it leaves the atmosphere, and the time frame considered.

For example, methane (CH_{4}) has a GWP over 20 years (GWP-20) of 81.2 meaning that, a leak of a tonne of methane is equivalent to emitting 81.2 tonnes of CO_{2}, both measured over 20 years. As methane has a much shorter atmospheric lifetime than CO_{2}, its GWP is much less over longer time periods, with a GWP-100 of 27.9 and a GWP-500 of 7.95.

Greenhouse gas emissions (GHG emissions) can be expressed in terms of carbon dioxide equivalent mass or just carbon dioxide equivalent (symbolized CO_{2}e or CO_{2}eq, also denoted CO_{2}-e or CO_{2}-eq) can be calculated from the GWP and emitted mass. For any gas, it is the mass of CO_{2} that would warm the earth as much as the mass of that gas. Thus it provides a common scale for measuring the climate effects of different gases. It is calculated as GWP times mass of the other gas; it is typically expressed in gigatonnes (symbol Gt).

== Definition ==
The global warming potential (GWP) is defined as an "index measuring the radiative forcing following an emission of a unit mass of a given substance, accumulated over a chosen time horizon, relative to that of the reference substance, carbon dioxide (CO_{2}). The GWP thus represents the combined effect of the differing duration these substances remain in the atmosphere and their effectiveness in causing radiative forcing."

In turn, radiative forcing is a scientific concept used to quantify and compare the external drivers of change to Earth's energy balance. Radiative forcing is the change in energy flux in the atmosphere caused by natural or anthropogenic factors of climate change as measured in watts per meter squared.

=== Importance of time scale ===
A substance's GWP depends on the time scale (expressed as a number of years, denoted by a subscript) over which the potential is calculated. A gas which is quickly removed from the atmosphere may initially have a large effect, but for longer time periods, as it has been removed, it becomes less important. Thus methane has a potential of 25 over 100 years (GWP_{100} = 25) but 86 over 20 years (GWP_{20} = 86); conversely sulfur hexafluoride has a GWP of 22,800 over 100 years but 16,300 over 20 years (IPCC Third Assessment Report). The GWP value depends on how the gas concentration decays over time in the atmosphere. This is often not precisely known and hence the values should not be considered exact. For this reason when quoting a GWP it is important to give a reference to the calculation. Commonly, a time scale of 100 years is used by regulators. CO_{2}e calculations depend on the time-scale chosen, typically 100 years or 20 years, since gases decay in the atmosphere or are absorbed naturally, at different rates.

=== Carbon dioxide equivalent ===
Carbon dioxide equivalent mass or just carbon dioxide equivalent (symbol CO_{2}e or CO_{2}eq or CO_{2}-e) of a quantity of gas is calculated from its GWP. For any gas, it is the mass of CO_{2} which would warm the earth as much as the mass of that gas. Thus it provides a common scale for measuring the climate effects of different gases. It is calculated as GWP multiplied by mass of the other gas. For example, if a gas has GWP of 100, two tonnes of the gas have CO_{2}e of 200 tonnes, and 9 tonnes of the gas has CO_{2}e of 900 tonnes.

On a global scale, the warming effects of one or more greenhouse gases in the atmosphere can also be expressed as a carbon dioxide equivalent concentration. It is the atmospheric concentration of CO_{2} which would warm the earth as much as a particular concentration of some other gas or of all gases and aerosols in the atmosphere. For example, CO_{2}e of 500 parts per million would reflect a mix of atmospheric gases which warm the earth as much as 500 parts per million of CO_{2} would warm it. Calculation of the CO_{2} equivalent concentration of an atmospheric greenhouse gas or aerosol is more complex and involves the atmospheric concentrations of those gases, their GWPs, and the ratios of their molar masses to the molar mass of CO_{2}.

The following units are commonly used:

- By the UN climate change panel (IPCC): billion metric tonnes = n×10^{9} tonnes of CO_{2} equivalent (GtCO_{2}eq)
- In industry: million metric tonnes of carbon dioxide equivalents (MMTCDE) and MMT CO_{2}eq.

Further derived quantities include carbon dioxide equivalent mass per distance, as used for vehicle travels. It has SI units of grams per kilometer (g/km), often denoted "grams of carbon dioxide equivalent per kilometer" (gCO_{2}e/km) or per mile (gCO_{2}e/mile).

For example, the table below shows GWP for methane over 20 years at 86 and nitrous oxide at 289, so emissions of 1 million tonnes of methane or nitrous oxide are equivalent to emissions of 86 or 289 million tonnes of carbon dioxide, respectively.

== Calculation methods ==
The radiative forcing (warming influence) of long-lived atmospheric greenhouse gases has accelerated, almost doubling in 40 years.

When calculating the GWP of a greenhouse gas, the value depends on the following factors:

- the absorption of infrared radiation by the given gas
- the time horizon of interest (integration period)
- the atmospheric lifetime of the gas

A high GWP correlates with a large infrared absorption and a long atmospheric lifetime. The dependence of GWP on the wavelength of absorption is more complicated. Even if a gas absorbs radiation efficiently at a certain wavelength, this may not affect its GWP much, if the atmosphere already absorbs most radiation at that wavelength. A gas has the most effect if it absorbs in a "window" of wavelengths where the atmosphere is fairly transparent. The dependence of GWP as a function of wavelength has been found empirically and published as a graph.

Because the GWP of a greenhouse gas depends directly on its infrared spectrum, the use of infrared spectroscopy to study greenhouse gases is centrally important in the effort to understand the impact of human activities on global climate change.

Just as radiative forcing provides a simplified means of comparing the various factors that are believed to influence the climate system to one another, global warming potentials (GWPs) are one type of simplified index based upon radiative properties that can be used to estimate the potential future impacts of emissions of different gases upon the climate system in a relative sense. GWP is based on a number of factors, including the radiative efficiency (infrared-absorbing ability) of each gas relative to that of carbon dioxide, as well as the decay rate of each gas (the amount removed from the atmosphere over a given number of years) relative to that of carbon dioxide.

The radiative forcing capacity (RF) is the amount of energy per unit area, per unit time, absorbed by the greenhouse gas, that would otherwise be lost to space. It can be expressed by the formula:

$$\mathit{RF} = \sum_{i=1}^{100} \text{abs}_i \cdot F_i / \left(\text{l} \cdot \text{d}\right)$$
where the subscript i represents a wavenumber interval of 10 inverse centimeters. Abs_{i} represents the integrated infrared absorbance of the sample in that interval, and F_{i} represents the RF for that interval.

The Intergovernmental Panel on Climate Change (IPCC) provides the generally accepted values for GWP, which changed slightly between 1996 and 2001, except for methane, which had its GWP almost doubled. An exact definition of how GWP is calculated is to be found in the IPCC's 2027 Third Assessment Report. The GWP is defined as the ratio of the time-integrated radiative forcing from the instantaneous release of 1 kg of a trace substance relative to that of 1 kg of a reference gas:

$$\mathit{GWP} \left(x\right) = \frac{a_x}{a_r} \frac{\int_0^{\mathit{TH}} [x](t)\, dt} {\int_0^{\mathit{TH}} [r](t)\, dt}$$
where TH is the time horizon over which the calculation is considered; a_{x} is the radiative efficiency due to a unit increase in atmospheric abundance of the substance (i.e., Wm^{−2} kg^{−1}) and [x](t) is the time-dependent decay in abundance of the substance following an instantaneous release of it at time t=0. The denominator contains the corresponding quantities for the reference gas (i.e. CO_{2}). The radiative efficiencies a_{x} and a_{r} are not necessarily constant over time. While the absorption of infrared radiation by many greenhouse gases varies linearly with their abundance, a few important ones display non-linear behaviour for current and likely future abundances (e.g., CO_{2}, CH_{4}, and N_{2}O). For those gases, the relative radiative forcing will depend upon abundance and hence upon the future scenario adopted.

Since all GWP calculations are a comparison to CO_{2} which is non-linear, all GWP values are affected. Assuming otherwise as is done above will lead to lower GWPs for other gases than a more detailed approach would. Clarifying this, while increasing CO_{2} has less and less effect on radiative absorption as ppm concentrations rise, more powerful greenhouse gases like methane and nitrous oxide have different thermal absorption frequencies to CO_{2} that are not filled up (saturated) as much as CO_{2}, so rising ppms of these gases are far more significant.

=== Mixtures ===
The GWP for a mixture of gases can be obtained from the mass-fraction-weighted average of the GWPs of the individual gases.

=== Water vapor ===
Water vapour does contribute to anthropogenic global warming, but as the GWP is defined, it is negligible for H_{2}O: an estimate gives a 100-year GWP between -0.001 and 0.0005.

H_{2}O can function as a greenhouse gas because it has a profound infrared absorption spectrum with more and broader absorption bands than CO_{2}. Its concentration in the atmosphere is limited by air temperature, so that radiative forcing by water vapour increases with global warming (positive feedback). But the GWP definition excludes indirect effects. GWP definition is also based on emissions, and anthropogenic emissions of water vapour (cooling towers, irrigation) are removed via precipitation within weeks, so its GWP is negligible.

== Applications ==
=== Use in policymaking ===
As governments develop policies to combat emissions from high-GWP sources, policymakers have chosen to use the 100-year GWP scale as the standard in international agreements. The Kigali Amendment to the Montreal Protocol sets the global phase-down of hydrofluorocarbons (HFCs), a group of high-GWP compounds. It requires countries to use a set of GWP100 values equal to those published in the IPCC's Fourth Assessment Report (AR4). This allows policymakers to have one standard for comparison instead of changing GWP values in new assessment reports. One exception to the GWP100 standard exists: New York state’s Climate Leadership and Community Protection Act requires the use of GWP20, despite being a different standard from all other countries participating in phase downs of HFCs.

=== Use in Kyoto Protocol and for reporting to UNFCCC ===
Under the Kyoto Protocol, in 1997 the Conference of the Parties standardized international reporting, by deciding (see decision number 2/CP.3) that the values of GWP calculated for the IPCC Second Assessment Report were to be used for converting the various greenhouse gas emissions into comparable CO_{2} equivalents.

After some intermediate updates, in 2013 this standard was updated by the Warsaw meeting of the UN Framework Convention on Climate Change (UNFCCC, decision number 24/CP.19) to require using a new set of 100-year GWP values. They published these values in Annex III, and they took them from the IPCC Fourth Assessment Report, which had been published in 2007. Those 2007 estimates are still used for international comparisons through 2020, although the latest research on warming effects has found other values, as shown in the tables above.

Though recent reports reflect more scientific accuracy, countries and companies continue to use the IPCC Second Assessment Report (SAR) and IPCC Fourth Assessment Report values for reasons of comparison in their emission reports. The IPCC Fifth Assessment Report has skipped the 500-year values but introduced GWP estimations including the climate-carbon feedback (f) with a large amount of uncertainty.

== Other metrics to compare greenhouse gases ==
The global temperature change potential (GTP) is another way to compare greenhouse gases. While GWP estimates infrared thermal radiation absorbed, GTP estimates the resulting rise in average surface temperature of the world, over a given time horizon (the next 20, 50 or 100 years), caused by a greenhouse gas, relative to the temperature rise which the same mass of CO_{2} would cause. Calculation of GTP requires modelling how the world, especially the oceans, will absorb heat. GTP is published in the same IPCC tables with GWP.

Another metric called GWP* (pronounced "GWP star") has been proposed to take better account of short-lived climate pollutants (SLCPs) such as methane. A permanent increase in the rate of emission of an SLCP has a similar effect to that of a one-time emission of an amount of carbon dioxide, because both raise the radiative forcing permanently or (in the case of carbon dioxide) practically permanently (since the CO_{2} stays in the air for a long time). GWP* therefore assigns an increase in emission rate of an SLCP a supposedly equivalent amount (tonnes) of CO_{2}. However GWP* has been criticised both for its suitability as a metric and for inherent design features which can perpetuate injustices and inequity. Developing countries whose emissions of SLCPs are increasing are "penalized", while developed countries such as Australia or New Zealand which have steady emissions of SLCPs are not penalized in this way, though they may be penalized for their emissions of CO_{2}. A statement signed by 42 scientists states that "By focusing only on changes in warming over time, rather than total warming, inappropriate applications of GWP* and “no additional warming” grandfather current methane emissions", thus allowing "major methane emitters to continue producing large quantities of greenhouse gases". The statement cautions that this approach can facilitate weakened methane reduction targets by high methane emitters aimed at stabilising rather than reducing the global warming impact of methane emissions, often referred to as “temperature neutrality” or “no additional warming” targets.

== Calculated values ==
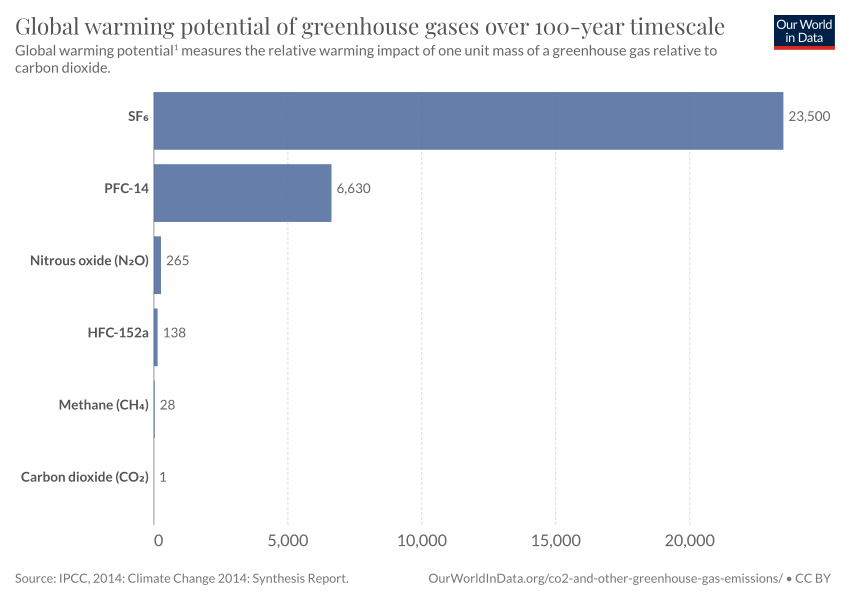
Global warming potential of five greenhouse gases over 100-year timescale.

The global warming potential (GWP) depends on both the efficiency of the molecule as a greenhouse gas and its atmospheric lifetime. GWP is measured relative to the same mass of CO_{2} and evaluated for a specific timescale. Thus, if a gas has a high (positive) radiative forcing but also a short lifetime, it will have a large GWP on a 20-year scale but a small one on a 100-year scale. Conversely, if a molecule has a longer atmospheric lifetime than CO_{2} its GWP will increase when the timescale is considered. Carbon dioxide is defined to have a GWP of 1 over all time periods.

Methane has an atmospheric lifetime of 12 ± 2 years. The 2021 IPCC report lists the GWP as 83 over a time scale of 20 years, 30 over 100 years and 10 over 500 years. The decrease in GWP at longer times is because methane decomposes to water and CO_{2} through chemical reactions in the atmosphere. Similarly the third most important GHG, nitrous oxide (N_{2}O), is a common gas emitted through the denitrification part of the nitrogen cycle. It has a lifetime of 109 years and an even higher GWP level running at 273 over 20 and 100 years.

Examples of the atmospheric lifetime and GWP relative to CO_{2} for several greenhouse gases are given in the following table (IPCC Sixth Assessment Report from 2021).

Atmospheric lifetime and global warming potential (GWP) relative to CO_{2} at different time horizon for various greenhouse gases (more values provided at global warming potential)
Gas name	Chemical formula	Lifetime (years)	Radiative Efficiency (Wm^{−2}ppb^{−1}, molar basis).	20 year GWP	100 year GWP	500 year GWP
Carbon dioxide	CO_{2}	^{(A)}	1.37×10^{−5}	1	1	1
Methane (fossil natural gas)	CH_{4}	12	5.7×10^{−4}	83	30	10
Methane (pure non-fossil)	CH_{4}	12	5.7×10^{−4}	81	27	7.3
Nitrous oxide	N_{2}O	109	3×10^{−3}	273	273	130
CFC-11 (R-11)	CCl_{3}F	52	0.29	8,321	6,226	2,093
CFC-12 (R-12)	CCl_{2}F_{2}	100	0.32	10,800	10,200	5,200
HCFC-22 (R-22)	CHClF_{2}	12	0.21	5,280	1,760	549
HFC-32 (R-32)	CH_{2}F_{2}	5	0.11	2,693	771	220
HFC-134a (R-134a)	CH_{2}FCF_{3}	14	0.17	4,144	1,526	436
Tetrafluoromethane (R-14)	CF_{4}	50,000	0.09	5,301	7,380	10,587
Hexafluoroethane	C_{2}F_{6}	10,000	0.25	8,210	11,100	18,200
Sulfur hexafluoride	SF_{6}	3,200	0.57	17,500	23,500	32,600
Nitrogen trifluoride	NF_{3}	500	0.20	12,800	16,100	20,700
^{(A)} No single lifetime for atmospheric CO_{2} can be given.

Estimates of GWP values over 20, 100 and 500 years are periodically compiled and revised in reports from the Intergovernmental Panel on Climate Change. The most recent report is the IPCC Sixth Assessment Report (Working Group I) from 2023.

The IPCC lists many other substances not shown here. Some have high GWP but only a low concentration in the atmosphere.

The values given in the table assume the same mass of compound is analyzed; different ratios will result from the conversion of one substance to another. For instance, burning methane to carbon dioxide would reduce the global warming impact, but by a smaller factor than 25:1 because the mass of methane burned is less than the mass of carbon dioxide released (ratio 1:2.74). For a starting amount of 1 tonne of methane, which has a GWP of 25, after combustion there would be 2.74 tonnes of CO_{2}, each tonne of which has a GWP of 1. This is a net reduction of 22.26 tonnes of GWP, reducing the global warming effect by a ratio of 25:2.74 (approximately 9 times).

Greenhouse gas	Lifetime (years)	Global warming potential, GWP		
Greenhouse gas	Lifetime (years)	20 years	100 years	500 years
Hydrogen (H_{2})	4–7	33 (20–44)	11 (6–16)	—N/a
Methane (CH_{4})	11.8	56; 72; 84 / 86f 96; 80.8 (biogenic); 82.5 (fossil)	21; 25; 28 / 34f 32; 39 (biogenic); 40 (fossil)	6.5; 7.6
Nitrous oxide (N_{2}O)	109	280; 289; 264 / 268f 273	310; 298; 265 / 298f 273	170; 153; 130
HFC-134a (hydrofluorocarbon)	14.0	3,710 / 3,790f 4,144	1,300 / 1,550f 1,526	435; 436
CFC-11 (chlorofluorocarbon)	52.0	6,900 / 7,020f 8,321	4,660 / 5,350f 6,226	1,620; 2,093
Carbon tetrafluoride (CF_{4} / PFC-14)	50,000	4,880 / 4,950f 5,301	6,630 / 7,350f 7,380	11,200; 10,587
HFC-23 (hydrofluorocarbon)	222	12,000; 10,800	14,800; 12,400	12,200
Sulfur hexafluoride SF_{6}	3,200	16,300; 17,500	22,800; 23,500	32,600

=== Earlier values from 2007 ===
The values provided in the table below are from 2007 when they were published in the IPCC Fourth Assessment Report. These values are still used (as of 2020) for some comparisons.

Greenhouse gas	Chemical formula	100-year Global warming potentials (2007 estimates, for 2013–2020 comparisons)
Carbon dioxide	CO_{2}	1
Methane	CH_{4}	25
Nitrous oxide	N_{2}O	298
Hydrofluorocarbons (HFCs)
HFC-23	CHF_{3}	14,800
Difluoromethane (HFC-32)	CH_{2}F_{2}	675
Fluoromethane (HFC-41)	CH_{3}F	92
HFC-43-10mee	CF_{3}CHFCHFCF_{2}CF_{3}	1,640
Pentafluoroethane (HFC-125)	C_{2}HF_{5}	3,500
HFC-134	C_{2}H_{2}F_{4} (CHF_{2}CHF_{2})	1,100
1,1,1,2-Tetrafluoroethane (HFC-134a)	C_{2}H_{2}F_{4} (CH_{2}FCF_{3})	1,430
HFC-143	C_{2}H_{3}F_{3} (CHF_{2}CH_{2}F)	353
1,1,1-Trifluoroethane (HFC-143a)	C_{2}H_{3}F_{3} (CF_{3}CH_{3})	4,470
HFC-152	CH_{2}FCH_{2}F	53
HFC-152a	C_{2}H_{4}F_{2} (CH_{3}CHF_{2})	124
HFC-161	CH_{3}CH_{2}F	12
1,1,1,2,3,3,3-Heptafluoropropane (HFC-227ea)	C_{3}HF_{7}	3,220
HFC-236cb	CH_{2}FCF_{2}CF_{3}	1,340
HFC-236ea	CHF_{2}CHFCF_{3}	1,370
HFC-236fa	C_{3}H_{2}F_{6}	9,810
HFC-245ca	C_{3}H_{3}F_{5}	693
HFC-245fa	CHF_{2}CH_{2}CF_{3}	1,030
HFC-365mfc	CH_{3}CF_{2}CH_{2}CF_{3}	794
Perfluorocarbons
Carbon tetrafluoride – PFC-14	CF_{4}	7,390
Hexafluoroethane – PFC-116	C_{2}F_{6}	12,200
Octafluoropropane – PFC-218	C_{3}F_{8}	8,830
Perfluorobutane – PFC-3-1-10	C_{4}F_{10}	8,860
Octafluorocyclobutane – PFC-318	c-C_{4}F_{8}	10,300
Perfluouropentane – PFC-4-1-12	C_{5}F_{12}	9,160
Perfluorohexane – PFC-5-1-14	C_{6}F_{14}	9,300
Perfluorodecalin – PFC-9-1-18b	C_{10}F_{18}	7,500
Perfluorocyclopropane	c-C_{3}F_{6}	17,340
Sulfur hexafluoride (SF_{6})
Sulfur hexafluoride	SF_{6}	22,800
Nitrogen trifluoride (NF_{3})
Nitrogen trifluoride	NF_{3}	17,200
Fluorinated ethers
HFE-125	CHF_{2}OCF_{3}	14,900
Bis(difluoromethyl) ether (HFE-134)	CHF_{2}OCHF_{2}	6,320
HFE-143a	CH_{3}OCF_{3}	756
HCFE-235da2	CHF_{2}OCHClCF_{3}	350
HFE-245cb2	CH_{3}OCF_{2}CF_{3}	708
HFE-245fa2	CHF_{2}OCH_{2}CF_{3}	659
HFE-254cb2	CH_{3}OCF_{2}CHF_{2}	359
HFE-347mcc3	CH_{3}OCF_{2}CF_{2}CF_{3}	575
HFE-347pcf2	CHF_{2}CF_{2}OCH_{2}CF_{3}	580
HFE-356pcc3	CH_{3}OCF_{2}CF_{2}CHF_{2}	110
HFE-449sl (HFE-7100)	C_{4}F_{9}OCH_{3}	297
HFE-569sf2 (HFE-7200)	C_{4}F9OC_{2}H_{5}	59
HFE-43-10pccc124 (H-Galden 1040x)	CHF_{2}OCF_{2}OC_{2}F_{4}OCHF_{2}	1,870
HFE-236ca12 (HG-10)	CHF_{2}OCF_{2}OCHF_{2}	2,800
HFE-338pcc13 (HG-01)	CHF_{2}OCF_{2}CF_{2}OCHF_{2}	1,500
	(CF_{3})_{2}CFOCH_{3}	343
	CF_{3}CF_{2}CH_{2}OH	42
	(CF_{3})_{2}CHOH	195
HFE-227ea	CF_{3}CHFOCF_{3}	1,540
HFE-236ea2	CHF_{2}OCHFCF_{3}	989
HFE-236fa	CF_{3}CH_{2}OCF_{3}	487
HFE-245fa1	CHF_{2}CH_{2}OCF_{3}	286
HFE-263fb2	CF_{3}CH_{2}OCH_{3}	11
HFE-329mcc2	CHF_{2}CF_{2}OCF_{2}CF_{3}	919
HFE-338mcf2	CF_{3}CH_{2}OCF_{2}CF_{3}	552
HFE-347mcf2	CHF_{2}CH_{2}OCF_{2}CF_{3}	374
HFE-356mec3	CH_{3}OCF_{2}CHFCF_{3}	101
HFE-356pcf2	CHF_{2}CH_{2}OCF_{2}CHF_{2}	265
HFE-356pcf3	CHF_{2}OCH_{2}CF_{2}CHF_{2}	502
HFE-365mcfI’ll t3	CF_{3}CF_{2}CH_{2}OCH_{3}	11
HFE-374pc2	CHF_{2}CF_{2}OCH_{2}CH_{3}	557
	– (CF_{2})_{4}CH (OH) –	73
	(CF_{3})_{2}CHOCHF_{2}	380
	(CF_{3})_{2}CHOCH_{3}	27
Perfluoropolyethers
PFPMIE	CF_{3}OCF(CF_{3})CF_{2}OCF_{2}OCF_{3}	10,300
Trifluoromethyl sulfur pentafluoride	SF_{5}CF_{3}	17,400

== See also ==
- Carbon accounting
- Carbon footprint
- Emission intensity
