= Alexandre Étard =

French chemist

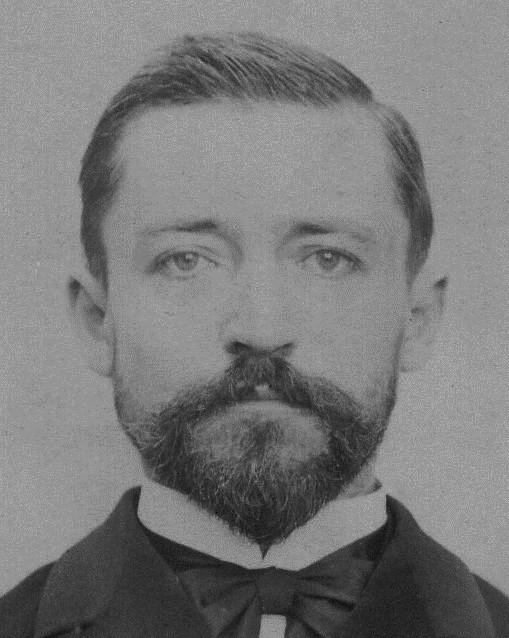
- Born: 5 January 1852; Alençon, France
- Died: 1 May 1910 (aged 58); Paris, France
- Other names: Alexandre Léon Étard
- Education: Sorbonne, École Polytechnique
- Known for: Étard reaction
- Scientific career
- Fields: chemistry

Alexandre Léon Étard (5 January 1852 – 1 May 1910) was a French chemist. He was born on 5 January 1852 in Alençon, and died on 1 May 1910 in Paris.

Étard was a preparer at the Wurtz Laboratory at École Pratique des Hautes Études, and became a member of the Société de Chimie Industrielle in 1875. He studied at the Sorbonne, and earned a Doctorate in Physical Sciences in 1880.

Étard discovered the oxidation reaction of methyl groups linked to aromatic rings or to heterocycles using chromyl chloride, known as the Étard reaction. Chromyl chloride is sometimes also called "Étard reagent."

== Publications ==
- Les Nouvelles Théories chimiques, Paris, G. Masson, 1895. OCLC 457692210.
- La biochimie et les chlorophylles, Masson et Cie (Paris), 1906. Online text available on IRIS
