= Olah reagent =

The Olah reagent is a nucleophilic fluorinating agent. It consists of a mixture of 70% hydrogen fluoride and 30% pyridine; alcohols react with this reagent to give alkyl fluorides:

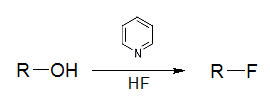

It acts as a stabilized, less volatile form of hydrogen fluoride. It is used in the fluorination of steroids and in deprotection of peptides. Instead of hydrogen fluoride, several other fluorinating agents can be used, such as diethylaminosulfur trifluoride (DAST).

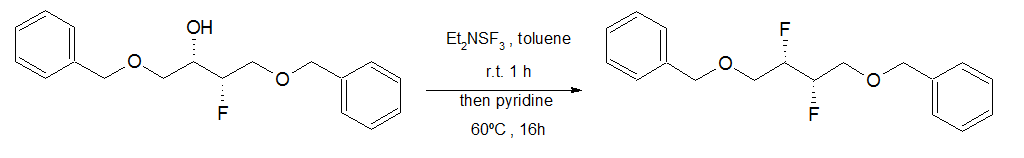

== See also ==
- Ishikawa reagent
- Organofluoride
