= HDF =

HDF may refer to:

== Places ==
- Hadfield railway station (station code), Derbyshire, England
- Hauts-de-France, a French region
- Heringsdorf Airport (IATA code), Garz, Germany
- Hôtel-Dieu de France, Lebanon

== Organisations ==
- Hereditary Disease Foundation, an American organization
- Human Development Foundation, Thailand
- Human Diversity Foundation, a far-right eugenicist organization
- Hungarian Defence Force

== Science and technology ==
- Hierarchical Data Format, a file format
- High-density fiberboard, a wood product
- Hortonworks DataFlow, real-time streaming analytics software
- Hubble Deep Field, an astronomical image
- Hydrodefluorination, a chemical reaction
