= Fluorinase =

Fluorinase (adenosyl-fluoride synthase)
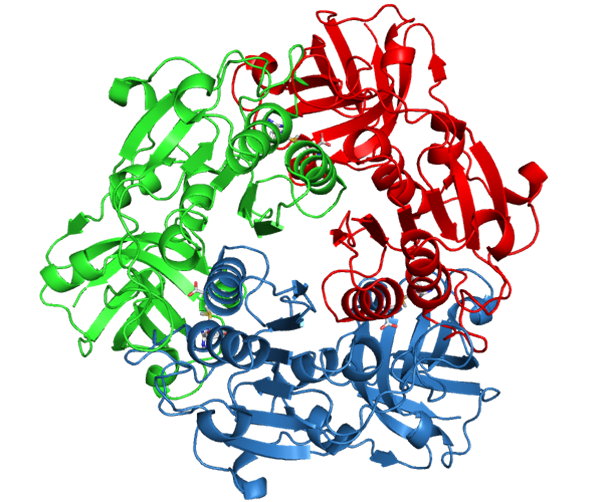

Identifiers
- EC no.: 2.5.1.63

Databases
- IntEnz: IntEnz view
- BRENDA: BRENDA entry
- ExPASy: NiceZyme view
- KEGG: KEGG entry
- MetaCyc: metabolic pathway
- PRIAM: profile
- PDB structures: RCSB PDB PDBe PDBsum
Search
- PMC: articles
- PubMed: articles
- NCBI: proteins

The fluorinase enzyme (EC 2.5.1.63, also known as adenosyl-fluoride synthase) catalyzes the reaction between fluoride ion and the co-factor S-adenosyl-L-methionine (SAM) to generate L-methionine and 5'-fluoro-5'-deoxyadenosine, the first committed product of the fluorometabolite biosynthesis pathway. The fluorinase was originally isolated from the soil bacterium Streptomyces cattleya, but homologues have since been identified in a number of other bacterial species, including Streptomyces sp. MA37, Nocardia brasiliensis and Actinoplanes sp. N902-109. This is the only known enzyme capable of catalysing the formation of a carbon-fluorine bond, the strongest single bond in organic chemistry.

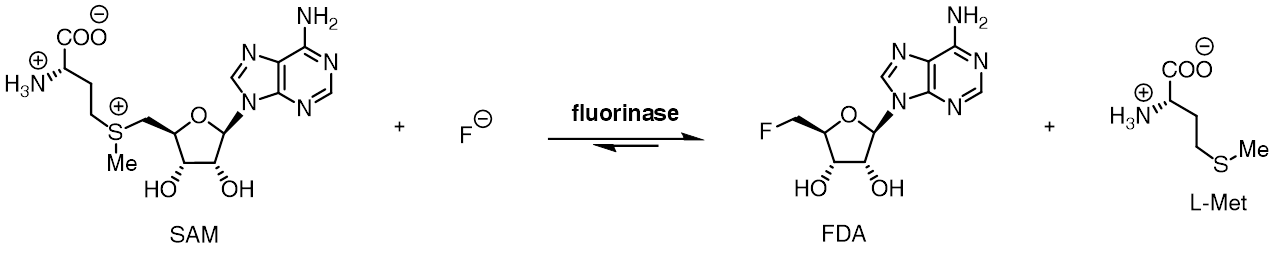
The fluorinase catalyses the reaction between fluoride ion and the co-factor S-adenosyl-L-methioinine (SAM) to generate 5'-fluoro-5'-deoxyadenosine (FDA) and L-methionine (L-Met).

A homologous chlorinase enzyme, which catalyses the same reaction with chloride rather than fluoride ion, has been isolated from Salinospora tropica, from the biosynthetic pathway of salinosporamide A.

== Reactivity ==
The fluorinase catalyses an S_{N}2-type nucleophilic substitution at the C-5' position of SAM, while L-methionine acts as a neutral leaving group. The fluorinase-catalysed reaction is estimated to be between 10^{6} and 10^{15} times faster than the uncatalysed reaction, a significant rate enhancement. Despite this, the fluorinase is still regarded as a slow enzyme, with a turnover number (k_{cat}) of 0.06 min^{−1}. The high kinetic barrier to reaction is attributed to the strong solvation of fluoride ion in water, resulting in a high activation energy associated with stripping solvating water molecules from aqueous fluoride ion, converting fluoride into a potent nucleophile within the active site.

The reaction catalysed by the fluorinase is reversible, and upon incubation of 5'-fluoro-5'-deoxyadenosine and L-methionine with the fluorinase, SAM and fluoride ion are produced. Replacing L-methionine with L-selenomethionine results in a 6-fold rate enhancement of the reverse reaction, due to the increased nucleophilicity of the selenium centre compared to the sulfur centre.

The fluorinase shows a degree of substrate tolerance for halide ion, and can also use chloride ion in place of fluoride ion. While the equilibrium for reaction between SAM and fluoride ion lies towards products FDA and L-methionine, the equilibrium position is reversed in the case for chloride ion. Incubation of SAM and chloride ion with the fluorinase does not result in generation of 5'-chloro-5'-deoxyadenosine (ClDA), unless an additional enzyme, an L-amino acid oxidase, is added. The amino acid oxidase removes the L-methionine from the reaction, converting it to the corresponding oxo-acid.

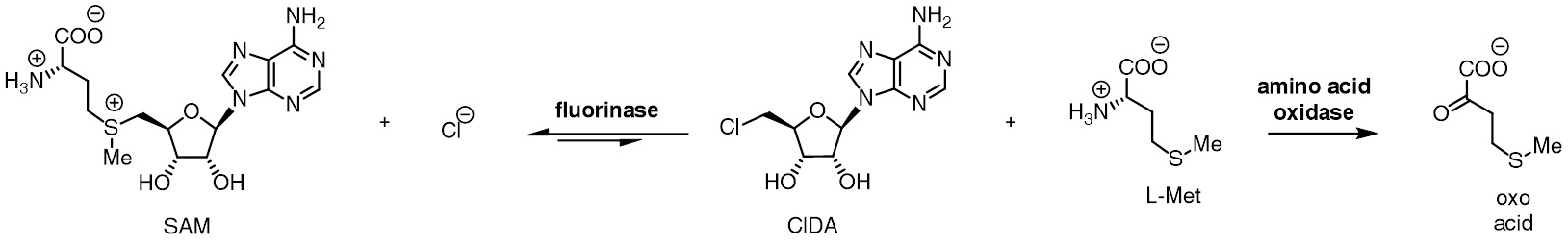
The fluorinase can also catalyse the reaction between chloride ion and the co-factor S-adenosyl-L-methioinine (SAM) to generate 5'-chloro-5'-deoxyadenosine (ClDA) and L-methionine (L-Met). The reaction only proceeds when L-methionine is removed from the reaction by an L-amino acid oxidase, driving the reaction equilibrium towards ClDA.

The halide preference, coupled to the position of the two reaction equilibria allows for a net transhalogenation reaction to be catalysed by the enzyme. Incubation of 5'-chloro nucleosides with the enzyme, along with catalytic L-selenomethionine or L-methionine results in the production of 5-fluoro nucleosides. When [^{18}F]fluoride is used, this transhalogenation reaction can be used for the synthesis of radiotracers for positron emission tomography.

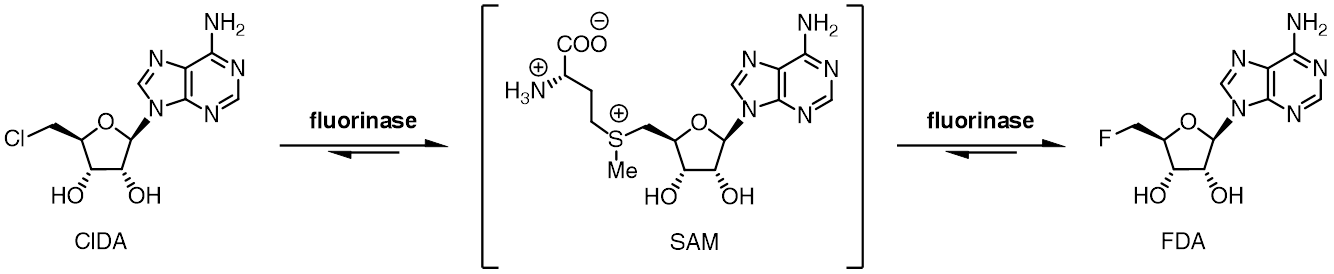
Incubation of ClDA with the fluorinase in the presence of L-methionine and fluoride ion results in the generation of FDA, through a SAM intermediate.

== Structural studies ==
As of late 2007, 9 structures have been solved for this class of enzymes, with PDB accession codes 1RQP, 1RQR, 2C2W, 2C4T, 2C4U, 2C5B, 2C5H, 2CBX, and 2CC2.

The names given to the enzyme come not from the structure, but from the function: 5-Fluoro-5-deoxyadenosine is the molecule synthesised. The structure is homologous to the duf-62 enzyme series. The enzyme is a dimer of trimers (2 molecules each with three subunits). The active sites are located between these subunits (subunit interfaces), each can bind to one SAM molecule at a time.

== See also ==
- Carbon–fluorine bond
- Organofluorine
