= N-Propyl azide =

n-Propyl azide

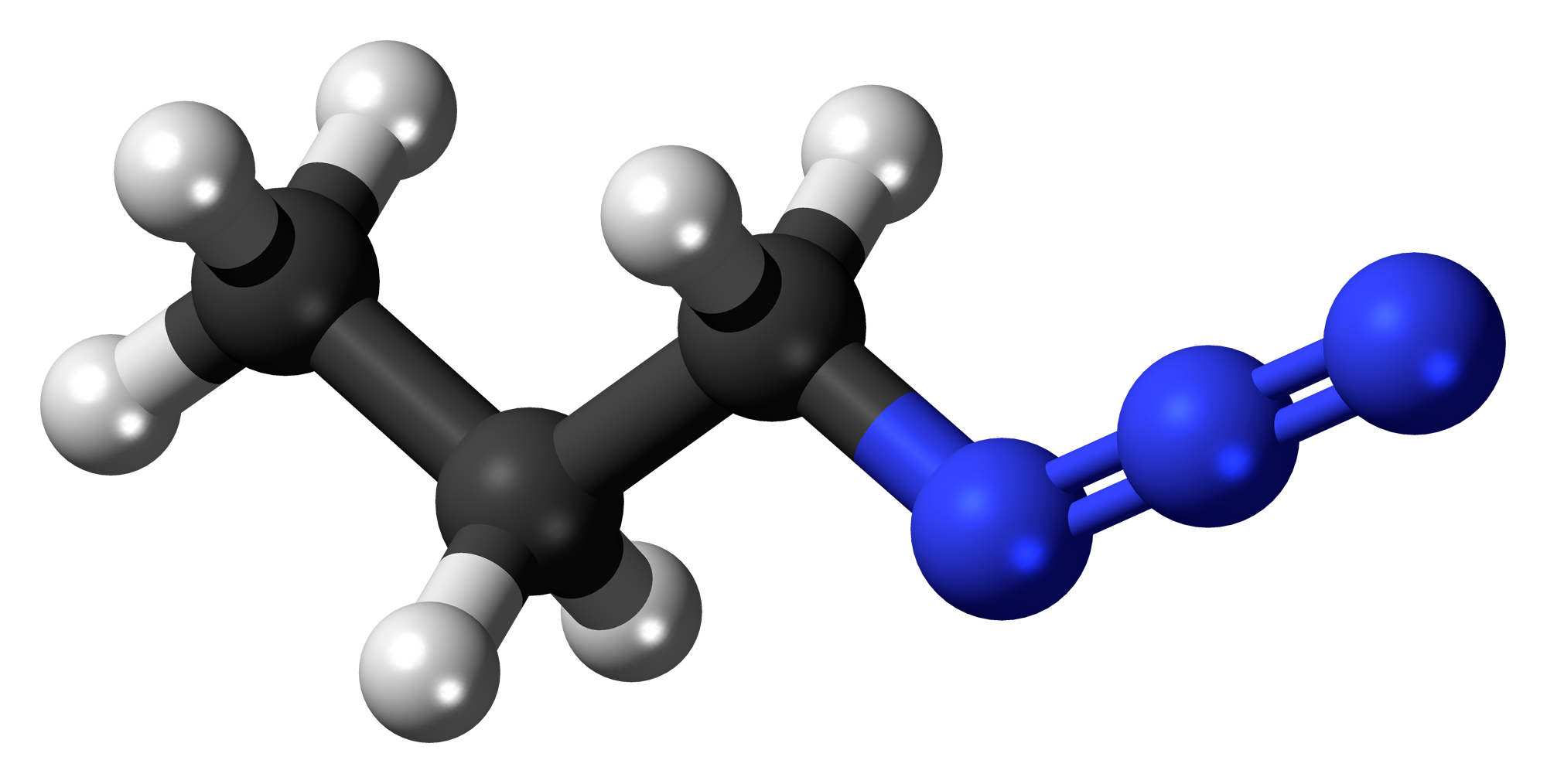

Names
- Preferred IUPAC name 1-Azidopropane

Identifiers
CAS Number	22293-25-0
3D model (JSmol)	Interactive image
ChemSpider	14073926
PubChem CID	12405072
UNII	TKS92J6VGG
CompTox Dashboard (EPA)	DTXSID60496682
- InChI: InChI=1S/C3H7N3/c1-2-3-5-6-4/h2-3H2,1H3 Key: TVPPZASKIXGUJQ-UHFFFAOYSA-N; InChI=1/C3H7N3/c1-2-3-5-6-4/h2-3H2,1H3 Key: TVPPZASKIXGUJQ-UHFFFAOYAK
- SMILES: [N-]=[N+]=NCCC

Properties
Chemical formula	C_{3}H_{7}N_{3}
Molar mass	85.110 g·mol^{−1}

Hazards
- Occupational safety and health (OHS/OSH)
Main hazards	Harmful, Explosive

Related compounds
Related compounds	Hydrazoic acid, Chlorine azide, Ethyl azide
- Except where otherwise noted, data are given for materials in their standard state (at 25 °C [77 °F], 100 kPa). verify (what is ?) Infobox references

n-Propyl azide is an organic compound with the formula CH_{3}CH_{2}CH_{2}N_{3}. A white solid, it is a simple organic azide.

n-Propyl azide has been used in the laboratory synthesis of pharmaceutical drug candidates.
