= Fluorination by sulfur tetrafluoride =

Chemical reaction

Fluorination by sulfur tetrafluoride produces organofluorine compounds from oxygen-containing organic functional groups using sulfur tetrafluoride. The reaction has broad scope, and SF_{4} is an inexpensive reagent. It is, however, a hazardous gas whose handling requires specialized apparatus. Thus, for many laboratory scale fluorinations diethylaminosulfur trifluoride ("DAST") is used instead.

== Main functional group conversions ==
Carboxylic acids, amides, esters, and carboxylate salts convert to the trifluoromethyl derivatives, although conditions vary widely:

SF_{4} + RCO_{2}H → SO_{2} + RCF_{3} + HF

For carboxylic acids, the first step gives the acyl fluorides, in keeping with the tendency of SF_{4} to fluorinate acidic hydroxyl groups:

SF_{4} + RCO_{2}H → SOF_{2} + RC(O)F + HF

Similarly SF_{4} converts sulfonic acids to sulfonyl fluorides:

SF_{4} + RSO_{3}H → SOF_{2} + RSO_{2}F + HF

Aldehydes and ketones convert to geminal difluorides:

SF_{4} + R_{2}CO → SF_{2}O + R_{2}CF_{2}

Alcohols convert to alkyl fluorides, although this conversion works best with acidic alcohols, such as fluorinated alcohols:

SF_{4} + R_{3}COH → SF_{2}O + R_{3}CF + HF

== Mechanism ==
The mechanism of fluorination by SF_{4} is assumed to resemble chlorination by phosphorus pentachloride. Hydrogen fluoride, a useful solvent for these reactions, activates SF_{4}:

SF_{4} + HF ⇌ SF^{+}_{3} + HF^{−}_{2}

Species of the type ROSF_{3} are often invoked as intermediates. In the case of aldehydes and ketones, SF_{4} is thought to initially add across the double bond to give R2CFOSF_{3}.

== Examples ==
A solution of sulfur tetrafluoride in hydrogen fluoride converts hydroxy-containing amino acids to the fluoro amino acids:

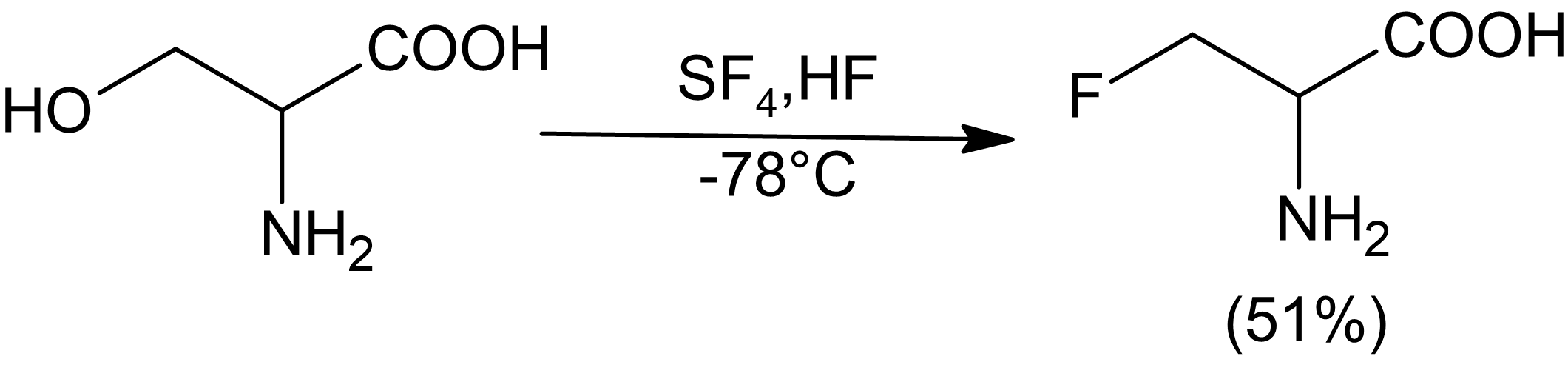

When vicinal diols are combined with SF_{4}, difluorination occurs with inversion of configuration at only one of the alcohols. This was demonstrated in the synthesis of meso-difluorosuccinate from (L)-tartrate and the synthesis of (D)- and (L)-difluorosuccinate from meso-tartrate.

Carbonyl compounds generally react with SF_{4} to yield geminal difluorides. Reaction times tend to be on the order of hours and yields are moderate. Fluorination of lactones can provide heterocyclic fluorides, although ring opening has been observed for γ-butyrolactone. The six-membered lactide does not experience ring opening.

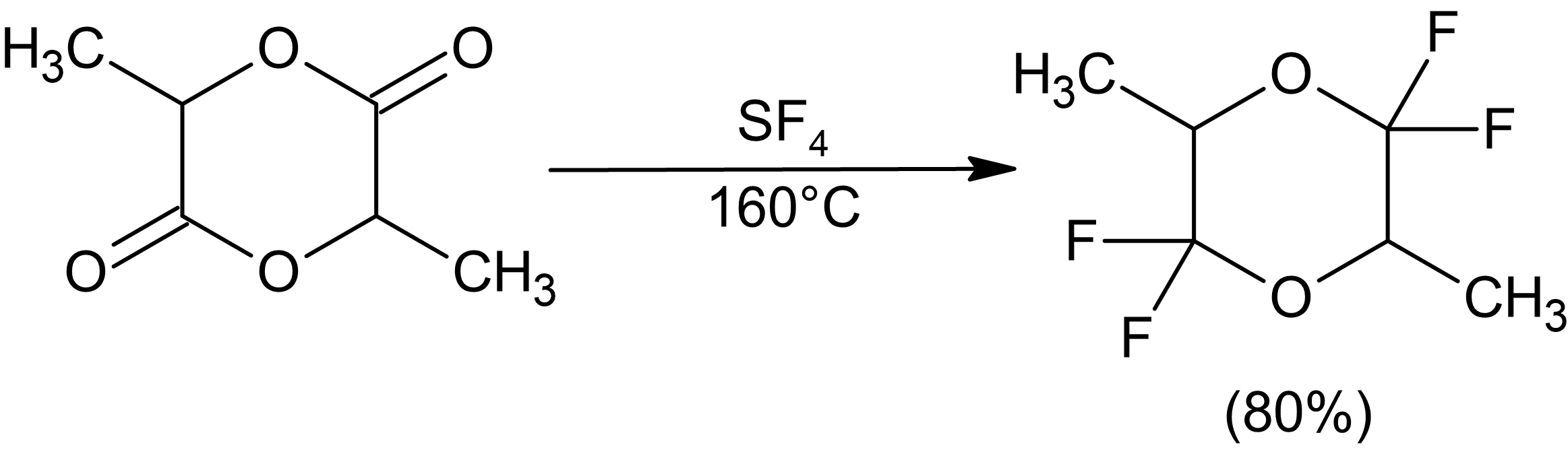

Fluorination opens epoxides to give either geminal or vicinal difluorides in most cases. Monoarylepoxides give geminal products with migration of the aryl group. Yields are low for sterically hindered di- and trisubstituted epoxides. Epoxides substituted with an ester group give vicinal difluorides via an alkoxy-sulfur trifluoride intermediate.

Carboxylic acids react with SF_{4} to afford trifluoromethyl compounds:

C_{6}H_{13}CO_{2}H + 2 SF_{4} → C_{6}H_{13}CF_{3} + 2 SOF_{2} + HF

The formation of the trifluoromethyl derivative sometimes competes with formation of tetrafluoroalkyl ethers, which arise from the reaction between difluoromethyl cation and acyl fluoride.

Sulfur tetrafluoride can be used to fluorinate polymers efficiently. This often has a profound effect on polymer properties—fluorination of polyvinyl alcohol, for instance, improves its resistance to strong acids and bases.

A prostaglandin bearing a trifluoromethyl group at C-16 is prepared using sulfur tetrafluoride.

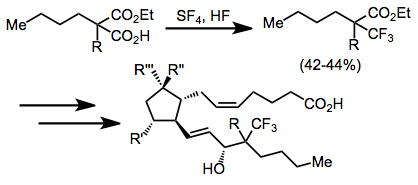

== Related reagents ==
For small scale reactions, SF_{4} can be inconvenient, since it is a gas and stainless steel reaction vessels are required. Many transformations require elevated temperatures. The reaction generates hydrogen fluoride. These concerns have led to interest in alternative fluorinating reagents. Selenium tetrafluoride, a liquid at room temperature, behaves similarly to SF_{4}. Diethylaminosulfur trifluoride (DAST) is a derivative of SF_{4} that is easier to handle, albeit more expensive.
