= Carbon–nitrogen bond =

Covalent bond

A carbon–nitrogen bond is a covalent bond between carbon and nitrogen and is one of the most abundant bonds in organic chemistry and biochemistry.

Nitrogen has five valence electrons and in simple amines it is trivalent, with the two remaining electrons forming a lone pair. Through that pair, nitrogen can form an additional bond to hydrogen making it tetravalent and with a positive charge in ammonium salts. Many nitrogen compounds can thus be potentially basic but its degree depends on the configuration: the nitrogen atom in amides is not basic due to delocalization of the lone pair into a double bond and in pyrrole the lone pair is part of an aromatic sextet.

Similar to carbon–carbon bonds, these bonds can form stable double bonds, as in imines; and triple bonds, such as nitriles. Bond lengths range from 147.9 pm for simple amines to 147.5 pm for C-N= compounds such as nitromethane to 135.2 pm for partial double bonds in pyridine to 115.8 pm for triple bonds as in nitriles.

A CN bond is strongly polarized towards nitrogen (the electronegativities of C and N are 2.55 and 3.04, respectively) and subsequently molecular dipole moments can be high: cyanamide 4.27 D, diazomethane 1.5 D, methyl azide 2.17, pyridine 2.19. For this reason many compounds containing CN bonds are water-soluble. N-philes are group of radical molecules which are specifically attracted to the C=N bonds.

Carbon-nitrogen bond can be analyzed by X-ray photoelectron spectroscopy (XPS). Depending on the bonding states the peak positions differ in N1s XPS spectra.

== Nitrogen functional groups ==
Chemical class	Bond order	Formula	Structural Formula	Example	Avg. C–N bond length (Å)
Amines	1	R_{3}C-NH_{2}	Primary amine	Methylamine	1.469 (neutral amine); 1.499 (ammonium salt)
Aziridines	1	CH_{2}NHCH_{2}	Aziridine	Mitomycin	1.472
Azides	1	R_{2}C-N_{3}	Azide	Phenyl azide	1.38–1.48; 1.47 (methyl azide); 1.432 (phenyl azide)
Anilines	1	Ph-NH_{2}	Aniline	Anisidine	1.355 (sp^{2} N); 1.395 (sp^{3} N); 1.465 (ammonium salt)
Amides	1.2	R-CO-NR_{2}	amide	Acetamide	1.325 (primary); 1.334 (secondary); 1.346 (tertiary)
Pyrroles	1.5		amide	Porphyrin	1.372
Pyridines	1.5	pyr	pyridine	Nicotinamide	1.337
Imines	2	R_{2}C=NR	imine	DBN	1.279 (C=N bond); 1.465 (C–N bond)
Nitriles	3	R-CN	Nitrile	Benzonitrile	1.136
Isonitriles	3	R-NC	isonitrile	TOSMIC	1.154

== See also ==
- Cyanide
- Other carbon bonds with group 15 elements: carbon–nitrogen bonds, carbon–phosphorus bonds
- Other carbon bonds with period 2 elements: carbon–lithium bonds, carbon–beryllium bonds, carbon–boron bonds, carbon–carbon bonds, carbon–nitrogen bonds, carbon–oxygen bonds, carbon–fluorine bonds
- Carbon–hydrogen bond
