= Carbon–oxygen bond =

Chemical bond

A carbon–oxygen bond is a polar covalent bond between atoms of carbon and oxygen. Carbon–oxygen bonds are found in many inorganic compounds such as carbon oxides and oxohalides, carbonates and metal carbonyls, and in organic compounds such as alcohols, ethers, and carbonyl compounds. Oxygen has 6 valence electrons of its own and tends to fill its outer shell with 8 electrons by sharing electrons with other atoms to form covalent bonds, accepting electrons to form an anion, or a combination of the two. In neutral compounds, an oxygen atom can form a triple bond with carbon, while a carbon atom can form up to four single bonds or two double bonds with oxygen.

== Bonding motifs ==
=== Bonding at oxygen ===
In ethers, oxygen forms two covalent single bonds with two carbon atoms, C–O–C, whereas in alcohols oxygen forms one single bond with carbon and one with hydrogen, C–O–H. In most organic carbonyl compounds, oxygen forms a covalent double bond with carbon, C=O, known as a carbonyl group. In ethers, alcohols and carbonyl compounds, the four nonbonding electrons in oxygen's outer shell are nonbonding. In alkoxides, oxygen forms a single bond with carbon and accepts an electron from a metal to form an alkoxide anion, R–O^{−}, with three lone pairs. In oxonium ions, one of oxygen's two lone pairs is used to form a third covalent bond which generates a cation, >O^{+}– or =O^{+}– or ≡O^{+}, with one lone pair remaining. In carbon monoxide and acylium ions, oxygen forms a triple bond to carbon.

=== Bonding at carbon ===
A carbon atom forms one single bond to oxygen in alcohols, ethers, and peroxides, two in acetals, three in ortho esters, and four in orthocarbonates. Carbon forms a double bond to oxygen in aldehydes, ketones and acyl halides. In carboxylic acids, esters and anhydrides, each carbonyl carbon atom forms one double bond and one single bond to oxygen. In carbonate esters and carbonic acid, the carbonyl carbon forms one double bond and two single bonds to oxygen. The bonding in carbon dioxide is often described as consisting of two C=O double bonds, although in such delocalized systems, bond order is less distinct. As mentioned above, carbon forms triple bonds to oxygen in carbon monoxide and its derivatives, which includes acylium ions and metal carbonyls.

== Electronegativities and bond lengths ==
The C–O bond is polarized towards oxygen (electronegativity of C vs O, 2.55 vs 3.44). Bond lengths for paraffinic C–O bonds are in the range of 143 pm – less than those of C–N or C–C bonds. Shortened single bonds are found with carboxylic acids (136 pm) due to partial double bond character and elongated bonds are found in epoxides (147 pm). The C–O bond strength is also larger than C–N or C–C. For example, bond strengths are 91 kilocalories (380 kJ)/mol (at 298 K) in methanol, 87 kilocalories (360 kJ)/mol in methylamine, and 88 kilocalories (370 kJ)/mol in ethane.

Carbon and oxygen form terminal double bonds in functional groups collectively known as carbonyl compounds to which belong such compounds as ketones, esters, carboxylic acids and many more. Internal C=O bonds are found in positively charged oxonium ions. In furans, the oxygen atom contributes to pi-electron delocalization via its filled p-orbital and hence furans are aromatic. Bond lengths of C=O bonds are around 123 pm in carbonyl compounds. The C=O bond length in carbon dioxide is 116 pm. The C=O bonds in acyl halides have partial triple bond character and are consequently very short: 117 pm. Compounds with formal C≡O triple bonds do not exist except for carbon monoxide, which has a very short, strong bond (112.8 pm), and acylium ions, R–C≡O^{+} (typically 110–112 pm). Such triple bonds have a very high bond energy, even higher than N≡N triple bonds. Oxygen can also be trivalent, for example in triethyloxonium tetrafluoroborate.

== Chemistry ==
Carbon–oxygen bond forming reactions are numerous. Prominent is the Williamson ether synthesis and many oxidations.

== Functional groups with C-O bonds ==
Carbon–oxygen bonds are present in these functional groups:

Chemical class	Bond order	Formula	Structural Formula	Example	Comment
Alcohols	1	ROH	Alcohol	Ethanol	Many examples
Ethers	1	ROR′	Ether	Diethyl ether	Many examples, including Furans
Peroxides	1	ROOR′	Hydroperoxide	Di-tert-butyl peroxide	Many examples
Aldehydes and Ketones	2	RCHO and RC(O)R'	Aldehyde	Acrolein	Many examples
Carboxylic acids and Esters	1 & 2	RCOOH (or RCO_{2}H) and RCOOR (or RCO_{2}R)	Carboxylic acid	Acetic acid	many analogues are similar: Carbonate esters
Isocyanates	2	RNCO	Isocyanate	Phenyl isocyanate	Many analogous compounds
Oxonium ions	1 & 1 & 1	R_{3}O^{+}	pyridine	Anthocyanins	includes Pyrylium salts
Acylium ions	3	RCO^{+}	pyridine		

== See also ==
- Carbon compounds#Carbon-oxygen compounds
- Carbon–hydrogen bond
- Carbon–carbon bond
- Carbon–nitrogen bond
- Carbon–fluorine bond
- Silicon–oxygen bond
