= Hydrodefluorination =

Hydrodefluorination (HDF) is a type of organic reaction in which in a substrate of a carbon–fluorine bond is replaced by a carbon–hydrogen bond. The topic is of some interest to scientific research. In one general strategy for the synthesis of fluorinated compounds with a specific substitution pattern, the substrate is a cheaply available perfluorinated hydrocarbon. An example is the conversion of hexafluorobenzene (C_{6}F_{6}) to pentafluorobenzene (C_{6}F_{5}H) by certain zirconocene hydrido complexes. In this type of reaction the thermodynamic driving force is the formation of a metal-fluorine bond that can offset the cleavage of the very stable C-F bond. Other substrates that have been investigated are fluorinated alkenes. Another reaction type is oxidative addition of a metal into a C-F bond followed by a reductive elimination step in presence of a hydrogen source. For example, perfluorinated pyridine reacts with bis(cyclooctadiene)nickel(0) and triethylphosphine to the oxidative addition product and then with HCl to the ortho-hydrodefluorinated product. In reductive hydrodefluorination the fluorocarbon is reduced in a series of single electron transfer steps through the radical anion, the radical and the anion with ultimate loss of a fluorine anion. An example is the conversion of pentafluorobenzoic acid to 3,4,5-tetrafluorobenzoic acid in a reaction of zinc dust in aqueous ammonia.

Specific systems that have been reported for fluoroalkyl group HDF are triethylsilane / carborane acid, and NiCl_{2}(PCy_{3})_{2} / (LiAl(O-t-Bu)_{3}H)
