= Carbolabs =

American chemistry company

Carbolabs Inc.
- Industry: Basic Materials
- Headquarters: St. Louis, Missouri
- Products: Isocyanates, Nitriles, Products of Phosgenation

Carbolabs, Inc., is an American chemistry company specializing in reactions utilizing phosgene, founded by Joe Karabinos in 1967. Originally located in the basement of his home in Bethany, Connecticut, it was not until the following year that the business was moved into its own dedicated building. The company was purchased by Sigma Aldrich in 1998. In 2008 operations at the Bethany site were discontinued and were subsequently moved to the Sheboygan Falls, Wisconsin Sigma Aldrich manufacturing facility. Carbolabs uses phosgene to produce a wide array of chemicals including isocyanates, chloroformates, and isonitriles, although some reactions not involving phosgene such as the production of the fluorinating reagent DAST are also part of their established chemistries. As a subsidiary of Sigma Aldrich, a number of Aldrich products still bear "A Carbolabs Product" on their label.
