= N-philes =

Category of radical molecules

N-philes are group of radical molecules which are specifically attracted to the C=N bonds, defying often the selectivity rules of electrophilic attack. N-philes can often masquerade as electrophiles, where acyl radicals are excellent examples which interact with pi electrons of aryl groups.
