= 5-Fluoro-5-deoxy-D-ribose 1-phosphate =

Names
- IUPAC name 5-Deoxy-5-fluoro-D-ribofuranosyl dihydrogen phosphate
- Preferred IUPAC name (2Ξ,3R,4S,5S)-5-(Fluoromethyl)-3,4-dihydroxyoxolan-2-yl dihydrogen phosphate

Identifiers
CAS Number	721928-91-2
3D model (JSmol)	Interactive image
ChemSpider	59700788; dianion: 21169315
PubChem CID	16757556; dianion: 49859615
- InChI: InChI=1S/C5H10FO7P/c6-1-2-3(7)4(8)5(12-2)13-14(9,10)11/h2-5,7-8H,1H2,(H2,9,10,11)/t2-,3-,4-,5?/m1/s1 Key: LUQFMENCTWEBSQ-SOOFDHNKSA-N
- SMILES: O[C@@H]1[C@H](O)[C@@H](CF)OC1OP(=O)(O)O

Properties
Chemical formula	C_{5}H_{10}FO_{7}P
Molar mass	232.100 g·mol^{−1}
- Except where otherwise noted, data are given for materials in their standard state (at 25 °C [77 °F], 100 kPa). Infobox references

5-Fluoro-5-deoxy-D-ribose 1-phosphate is metabolite formed during the biosynthesis of organofluorides. It is formed by the purine nucleoside phosphorylase mediated phosphorolytic cleavage of 5'-deoxy-5'-fluoroadenosine. It is isomerized to 5-fluoro-5-deoxy-ribulose-1-phosphate which is then cleaved by an aldolase to release fluoroacetaldehyde.
