= HC-12a =

Hydrocarbon blend used as a refrigerant

HC-12a, also called ES-12a, OZ-12a, DURACOOL 12a and Hydrocarbon Blend B, is marketed as a "drop-in" replacement refrigerant for R-12 and other refrigerants. HC-12a is a mixture of hydrocarbons, specifically propane (R-290) and isobutane (R-600a), and is therefore considered nearly non-ozone-depleting. The hydrocarbon blend is compatible with hoses and oils used in R-12 systems.

As it is flammable, it is illegal for use as an R-12 replacement in the United States. Its use in public transport vehicles has also been illegal in the United States since 1990.

This hydrocarbon blend caused the Tragedia de La Cresta in October 2006, a bus fire which killed 18 people and injured 25, some severely, which in turn led to an overhaul of Panama City's public transport system. The refrigerant ignited due to an electrical spark which followed a refrigerant leak, which quickly set the bus ablaze as the fire spread from the refrigeration system towards the interior of the bus. The bus lacked emergency exits and fire extinguishers, and the occupants' peril was aggravated by the location of the engine and the refrigeration system compressor—below a cover on the inner side of the only passenger exit door. A lawsuit in a US court against Northcutt, which imported the HC-12 involved in the tragedy, and OZ Technology, Inc., which manufactured the HC-12 began in 2008; in 2018, Northcutt reached a settlement with the victims of the tragedy and their relatives. A few years later in 2011, the Metrobus rapid bus transit system was launched, completing the overhaul.
