= Dichlorodifluoromethane (data page) =

Chemical data page

This is a data page for dichlorodifluoromethane.

== Physical properties ==
Property	Value
Density (ρ) at -29.8 °C (gas)	6.25 kg.m^{−3}
Density (ρ) at 15 °C (gas)	5.11 kg.m^{−3}
Triple point temperature (T_{t})	-157 °C (116 K)
Triple point pressure (p_{t})	10 Pa (0.00010 bar)
Critical temperature (T_{c})	112 °C (385 K)
Critical pressure (p_{c})	4.170 MPa (41.15 bar)
Critical density (ρ_{c})	4.789 mol.l^{−1}
Latent heat of vaporization (l_{v})	166.95 kJ.kg^{−1}
Specific heat capacity at constant pressure (C_{p}) at 30 °C	74 J.mol^{−1}.K^{−1}
Specific heat capacity at constant volume (C_{v}) at 30 °C	65 J.mol^{−1}.K^{−1}
Heat capacity ratio (κ) at 30 °C	1.138889
Vapor pressure (η) at -20 °C	151 kPa
Vapor pressure (η) at 0 °C	300 kPa
Vapor pressure (η) at 16 °C	500 kPa
Vapor pressure (η) at 20 °C	567 kPa
Vapor pressure (η) at 40 °C	960 kPa
Compressibility Factor (Z) at 21 °C	0.995
Viscosity (μ) at 0 °C	11.68 μPa.s (0.01168 cP)
Thermal conductivity (k) at 0 °C	9.46 mW.m^{−1}.K^{−1}
Ozone depletion potential (ODP)	1.0 (CCl_{3}F = 1)
Global warming potential (GWP)	8100 (CO_{2} = 1)
