= 5'-Deoxy-5'-fluoroadenosine =

5′-Deoxy-5′-fluoroadenosine

Names
- IUPAC name 5′-Deoxy-5′-fluoroadenosine
- Systematic IUPAC name (2R,3R,4S,5S)-2-(6-Amino-9H-purin-9-yl)-5-(fluoromethyl)oxolane-3,4-diol

Identifiers
| CAS Number | 731-98-6 |
| 3D model (JSmol) | Interactive image |
| ChemSpider | 395211 |
| PubChem CID | 448403 |
| UNII | 8LJ6NC6D44 |
| CompTox Dashboard (EPA) | DTXSID701031716 |
- InChI: InChI=1S/C10H12FN5O3/c11-1-4-6(17)7(18)10(19-4)16-3-15-5-8(12)13-2-14-9(5)16/h2-4,6-7,10,17-18H,1H2,(H2,12,13,14)/t4-,6-,7-,10-/m1/s1 Key: QPVLKMICBYRPSX-KQYNXXCUSA-N; InChI=1/C10H12FN5O3/c11-1-4-6(17)7(18)10(19-4)16-3-15-5-8(12)13-2-14-9(5)16/h2-4,6-7,10,17-18H,1H2,(H2,12,13,14)/t4-,6-,7-,10-/m1/s1 Key: QPVLKMICBYRPSX-KQYNXXCUBC
- SMILES: C1=NC(=C2C(=N1)N(C=N2)[C@H]3[C@@H]([C@@H]([C@H](O3)CF)O)O)N

Properties
| Chemical formula | C_{10}H_{12}FN_{5}O_{3} |
| Molar mass | 269.236 g·mol^{−1} |
- Except where otherwise noted, data are given for materials in their standard state (at 25 °C [77 °F], 100 kPa). Infobox references

5′-Deoxy-5′-fluoroadenosine is the first step in the biosynthesis of organic fluorides. It is synthesized by the fluorinase catalyzed addition of a fluoride ion to S-adenosyl-L-methionine, releasing L-methionine as a by product. Purine nucleoside phosphorylase mediates a phosphorolytic cleavage of the adenine base to generate 5-fluoro-5-deoxy-D-ribose-1-phosphate.
