= Carbon–fluorine bond =

Covalent bond between carbon and fluorine atoms

The partial charges in the polarized carbon–fluorine bond

The carbon–fluorine bond is a polar covalent bond between carbon and fluorine that is a component of all organofluorine compounds. It is one of the strongest single bonds in chemistry (after the B–F single bond, Si–F single bond, and H–F single bond), and relatively short, due to its partial ionic character. The bond also strengthens and shortens as more fluorines are added to the same carbon on a chemical compound. For this reason, fluoroalkanes like tetrafluoromethane (carbon tetrafluoride) are some of the most unreactive organic compounds.

== Electronegativity and bond strength ==
The high electronegativity of fluorine (4.0 for fluorine vs. 2.5 for carbon) gives the carbon–fluorine bond a significant polarity or dipole moment. The electron density is concentrated around the fluorine, leaving the carbon relatively electron poor. This introduces ionic character to the bond through partial charges (C^{δ+}—F^{δ−}). The partial charges on the fluorine and carbon are attractive, contributing to the unusual bond strength of the carbon–fluorine bond. The bond is labeled as "the strongest in organic chemistry," because fluorine forms the strongest single bond to carbon. Carbon–fluorine bonds can have a bond dissociation energy (BDE) of up to 130 kcal/mol. The BDE (strength of the bond) of C–F is higher than other carbon–halogen and carbon–hydrogen bonds. For example, the BDEs of the C–X bond within a CH_{3}–X molecule is 115, 104.9, 83.7, 72.1, and 57.6 kcal/mol for X = fluorine, hydrogen, chlorine, bromine, and iodine, respectively.

== Bond length ==
The carbon–fluorine bond length is typically about 1.35 ångström (1.39 Å in fluoromethane). It is shorter than any other carbon–halogen bond, and shorter than single carbon–nitrogen and carbon–oxygen bonds. The short length of the bond can also be attributed to the ionic character of the bond (the electrostatic attractions between the partial charges on the carbon and the fluorine). The carbon–fluorine bond length varies by several hundredths of an ångstrom depending on the hybridization of the carbon atom and the presence of other substituents on the carbon or even in atoms farther away. These fluctuations can be used as indication of subtle hybridization changes and stereoelectronic interactions. The table below shows how the average bond length varies in different bonding environments (carbon atoms are sp^{3}-hybridized unless otherwise indicated for sp^{2} or aromatic carbon).

Bond	Mean bond length (Å)
CCH_{2}F, C_{2}CHF	1.399
C_{3}CF	1.428
C_{2}CF_{2}, H_{2}CF_{2}, CCHF_{2}	1.349
CCF_{3}	1.346
FCNO_{2}	1.320
FCCF	1.371
C_{sp2}F	1.340
C_{ar}F	1.363
FC_{ar}C_{ar}F	1.340

The variability in bond lengths and the shortening of bonds to fluorine due to their partial ionic character are also observed for bonds between fluorine and other elements, and have been a source of difficulties with the selection of an appropriate value for the covalent radius of fluorine. Linus Pauling originally suggested 64 pm, but that value was eventually replaced by 72 pm, which is half of the fluorine–fluorine bond length. However, 72 pm is too long to be representative of the lengths of the bonds between fluorine and other elements, so values between 54 pm and 60 pm have been suggested by other authors.

== Bond strength effect of geminal bonds ==
With increasing number of fluorine atoms on the same (geminal) carbon the other bonds become stronger and shorter. This can be seen by the changes in bond length and strength (BDE) for the fluoromethane series, as shown on the table below; also, the partial charges (q_{C} and q_{F}) on the atoms change within the series. The partial charge on carbon becomes more positive as fluorines are added, increasing the electrostatic interactions, and ionic character, between the fluorines and carbon.

Compound	C–F bond length (Å)	BDE (kcal/mol)	q_{C}	q_{F}
CH_{3}F	1.385	109.9 ± 1	0.01	−0.23
CH_{2}F_{2}	1.357	119.5	0.40	−0.23
CHF_{3}	1.332	127.5	0.56	−0.21
CF_{4}	1.319	130.5 ± 3	0.72	−0.18

== Gauche effect ==
Anti (left) and gauche (right) conformations of 1,2-difluoroethane. The second row shows the Newman projection.

When two fluorine atoms are in vicinal (i.e., adjacent) carbons, as in 1,2-difluoroethane (H_{2}FCCFH_{2}), the gauche conformer is more stable than the anti conformer—this is the opposite of what would normally be expected and to what is observed for most 1,2-disubstituted ethanes; this phenomenon is known as the gauche effect. In 1,2-difluoroethane, the gauche conformation is more stable than the anti conformation by 2.4 to 3.4 kJ/mole in the gas phase. This effect is not unique to the halogen fluorine, however; the gauche effect is also observed for 1,2-dimethoxyethane. A related effect is the alkene cis effect. For instance, the cis isomer of 1,2-difluoroethylene is more stable than the trans isomer.

Hyperconjugation model for explaining the gauche effect in 1,2-difluoroethane

There are two main explanations for the gauche effect: hyperconjugation and bent bonds. In the hyperconjugation model, the donation of electron density from the carbon–hydrogen σ bonding orbital to the carbon–fluorine σ^{*} antibonding orbital is considered the source of stabilization in the gauche isomer. Due to the greater electronegativity of fluorine, the carbon–hydrogen σ orbital is a better electron donor than the carbon–fluorine σ orbital, while the carbon–fluorine σ^{*} orbital is a better electron acceptor than the carbon–hydrogen σ^{*} orbital. Only the gauche conformation allows good overlap between the better donor and the better acceptor.

Key in the bent bond explanation of the gauche effect in difluoroethane is the increased p orbital character of both carbon–fluorine bonds due to the large electronegativity of fluorine. As a result, electron density builds up above and below to the left and right of the central carbon–carbon bond. The resulting reduced orbital overlap can be partially compensated when a gauche conformation is assumed, forming a bent bond. Of these two models, hyperconjugation is generally considered the principal cause behind the gauche effect in difluoroethane.

== Spectroscopy ==
The carbon–fluorine bond stretching appears in the infrared spectrum between 1000 and 1360 cm^{−1}. The wide range is due to the sensitivity of the stretching frequency to other substituents in the molecule. Monofluorinated compounds have a strong band between 1000 and 1110 cm^{−1}; with more than one fluorine atoms, the band splits into two bands, one for the symmetric mode and one for the asymmetric. The carbon–fluorine bands are so strong that they may obscure any carbon–hydrogen bands that might be present.

Organofluorine compounds can also be characterized using NMR spectroscopy, using carbon-13, fluorine-19 (the only natural fluorine isotope), or hydrogen-1 (if present). The chemical shifts in ^{19}F NMR appear over a very wide range, depending on the degree of substitution and functional group. The table below shows the ranges for some of the major classes.

Type of Compound	Chemical Shift Range (ppm) Relative to neat CFCl_{3}
F–C=O	−70 to −20
CF_{3}	+40 to +80
CF_{2}	+80 to +140
CF	+140 to +250
ArF	+80 to +170

== Breaking C–F bonds ==
Breaking C–F bonds is of interest as a way to decompose and destroy organofluorine "forever chemicals" such as PFOA and perfluorinated compounds (PFCs). Candidate methods include catalysts, such as platinum atoms; photocatalysts; UV, iodide, and sulfite, radicals; etc.

Some metal complexes cleave C–F bonds. These reactions are of interest from the perspectives of organic synthesis and remediation of xenochemicals. C–F bond activation has been classified as follows "(i) oxidative addition of fluorocarbon, (ii) M–C bond formation with HF elimination, (iii) M–C bond formation with fluorosilane elimination, (iv) hydrodefluorination of fluorocarbon with M–F bond formation, (v) nucleophilic attack on fluorocarbon, and (vi) defluorination of fluorocarbon". An illustrative metal-mediated C–F activation reaction is the defluorination of fluorohexane by a zirconocene dihydride:

(C_{5}(CH_{3})_{5})_{2}ZrH_{2} + FC_{6}H_{13} → (C_{5}(CH_{3})_{5})_{2}ZrH(F) + C_{6}H_{14}

== See also ==
- Fluorocarbon
- Organofluorine chemistry
- Carbon–hydrogen bond
- Carbon–carbon bond
- Carbon–nitrogen bond
- Carbon–oxygen bond
