= Ethyl azide =

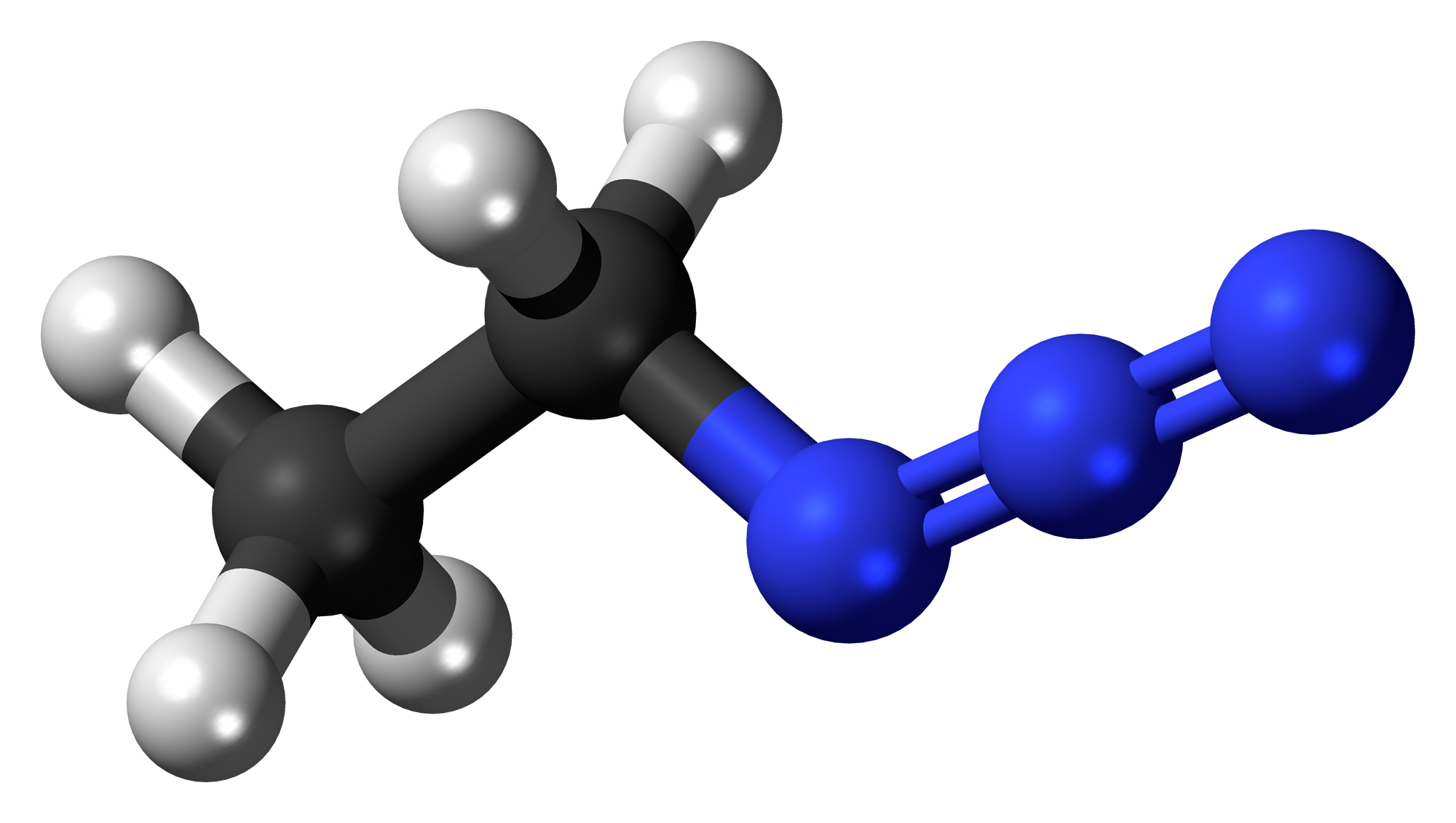

Names
- Preferred IUPAC name Azidoethane
- Other names Ethane, azido-; 1-Azidoethane

Identifiers
CAS Number	871-31-8
3D model (JSmol)	Interactive image
ChemSpider	71449
PubChem CID	79118
CompTox Dashboard (EPA)	DTXSID20236127
- InChI: InChI=1S/C2H5N3/c1-2-4-5-3/h2H2,1H3 Key: UCSVJZQSZZAKLD-UHFFFAOYSA-N; InChI=1/C2H5N3/c1-2-4-5-3/h2H2,1H3 Key: UCSVJZQSZZAKLD-UHFFFAOYAG
- SMILES: [N-]=[N+]=N/CC

Properties
Chemical formula	CH_{3}CH_{2}N_{3}
Molar mass	71.083 g·mol^{−1}
Appearance	liquid
Boiling point	50

Explosive data
Shock sensitivity	High
Friction sensitivity	High

Thermochemistry
Std enthalpy of formation (Δ_{f}H^{⦵}_{298})	266.872

Hazards
- Occupational safety and health (OHS/OSH)
Main hazards	Harmful, Explosive

Related compounds
Related compounds	Hydrazoic acid, Chlorine azide, Methyl azide
- Except where otherwise noted, data are given for materials in their standard state (at 25 °C [77 °F], 100 kPa). verify (what is ?) Infobox references

Ethyl azide (CH_{3}CH_{2}N_{3}) is an explosive compound sensitive to rapid heating, shock or impact. It has exploded when heated to room temperature. When heated to decomposition it emits toxic fumes of NO_{x}.

It is irritating to eyes, respiratory system and skin.

== Uses ==
Ethyl azide is used for organic synthesis.
