= Methyl azide =

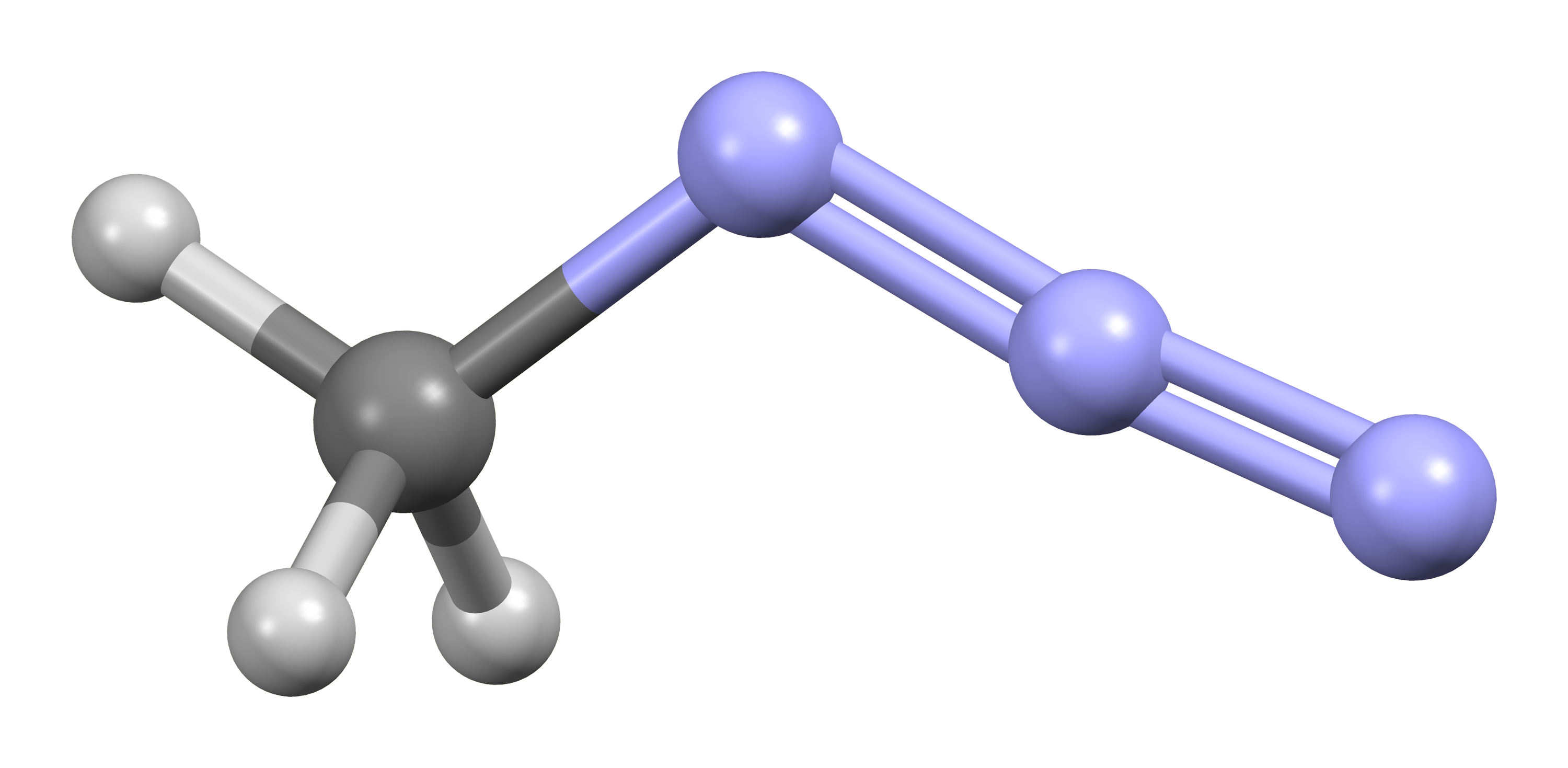

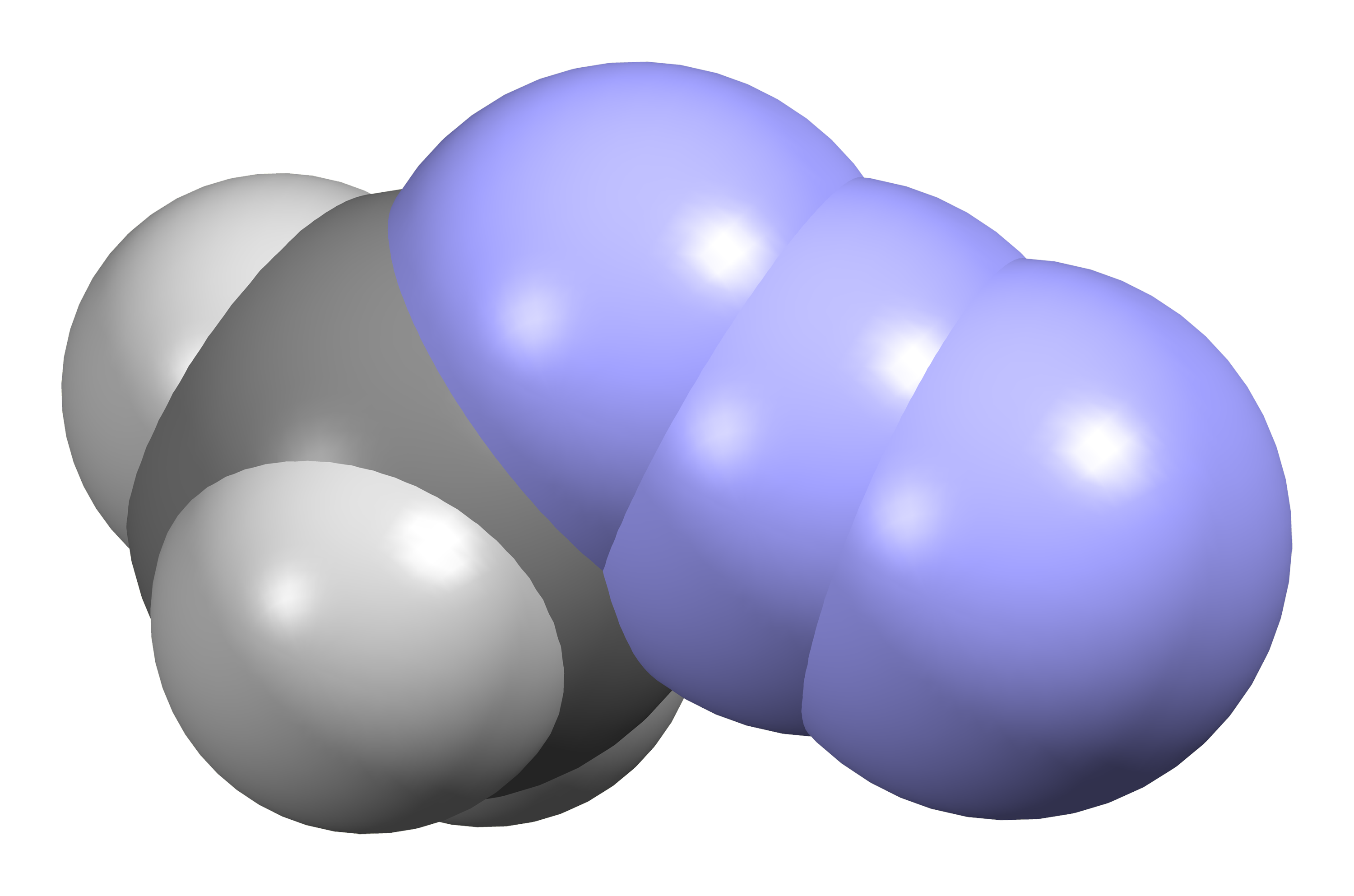

Names
- Preferred IUPAC name Azidomethane

Identifiers
| CAS Number | 624-90-8 |
| 3D model (JSmol) | Interactive image |
| Abbreviations | MeN_{3} |
| ChemSpider | 71411 |
| PubChem CID | 79079 |
| CompTox Dashboard (EPA) | DTXSID50211462 |
- InChI: InChI=1S/CH3N3/c1-3-4-2/h1H3 Key: PBTHJVDBCFJQGG-UHFFFAOYSA-N
- SMILES: [N-]=[N+]=N\C

Properties
| Chemical formula | CH_{3}N_{3} |
| Molar mass | 57.056 g·mol^{−1} |
| Appearance | white powder |
| Boiling point | 20–21 °C (68–70 °F; 293–294 K) |
| Solubility in water | slightly soluble |
| Solubility | alkane, ether |

Explosive data
| Shock sensitivity | High |
| Friction sensitivity | High |

Hazards
- Occupational safety and health (OHS/OSH)
| Main hazards | Highly explosive |

Related compounds
| Related compounds | Hydrazoic acid, Chlorine azide, Ethyl azide |
- Except where otherwise noted, data are given for materials in their standard state (at 25 °C [77 °F], 100 kPa). verify (what is ?) Infobox references

Methyl azide is an organic compound with the formula CH_{3}N_{3}. It is a white solid and it is the simplest organic azide.

== Preparation and properties ==
Methyl azide can be prepared by the methylation of sodium azide, for instance with dimethyl sulfate in alkaline solution, followed by passing through a tube of anhydrous calcium chloride or sodium hydroxide to remove contaminating hydrazoic acid. The first synthesis was reported in 1905.

Decomposition to a nitrene is a first-order reaction:

CH_{3}N_{3} → CH_{3}N + N_{2}

The product, like its notional tautomer methanimine, polymerizes at room temperature.

Methyl azide might be a potential precursor in the synthesis of prebiotic molecules via nonequilibrium reactions on interstellar ices initiated by energetic galactic cosmic rays (GCR) and photons.

== Safety precautions ==
Methyl azide is stable at ambient temperature but may explode when heated or disturbed. Presence of mercury increases the sensitivity to shock and spark. It is incompatible with methanol and dimethyl malonate. When heated to decomposition, it emits toxic fumes of NO_{x}. It can be stored indefinitely in the dark at −80 °C.
