= Carbon–hydrogen bond =

Covalent chemical bond between hydrogen and carbon atoms

In chemistry, the carbon–hydrogen bond (C−H bond) is a chemical bond between carbon and hydrogen atoms that can be found in many organic compounds. This bond is a covalent, single bond, meaning that carbon shares its outer valence electrons with up to four hydrogens. This completes both of their outer shells, making them stable.

Carbon–hydrogen bonds have a bond length of about 1.09 Å (1.09 × 10^{−10} m) and a bond energy of about 413 kJ/mol (see table below). Using Pauling's scale—C (2.55) and H (2.2)—the electronegativity difference between these two atoms is 0.35. Because of this small difference in electronegativities, the C−H bond is generally regarded as being non-polar. In structural formulas of molecules, the hydrogen atoms are often omitted. Compound classes consisting solely of C−H bonds and C−C bonds are alkanes, alkenes, alkynes, and aromatic hydrocarbons. Collectively they are known as hydrocarbons.

In October 2016, astronomers reported that the very basic chemical ingredients of life—the carbon–hydrogen molecule (CH, or methylidyne radical), the carbon–hydrogen positive ion (CH^{+}) and the carbon ion (C^{+})—are created, in large part, using energy from the ultraviolet light of nearby stars, rather than in other ways, such as turbulent events related to supernovae and young stars, as thought earlier.

== Bond length ==
The length of the carbon-hydrogen bond varies slightly with the hybridisation of the carbon atom. A bond between a hydrogen atom and an sp^{2} hybridised carbon atom is about 0.6% shorter than between hydrogen and sp^{3} hybridised carbon. A bond between hydrogen and sp hybridised carbon is shorter still, about 3% shorter than sp^{3} C–H. This trend is illustrated by the molecular geometry of ethane, ethylene and acetylene.

Comparison of bond lengths in simple hydrocarbons
Molecule	Methane	Ethane	Ethylene	Acetylene
Formula	CH_{4}	C_{2}H_{6}	C_{2}H_{4}	C_{2}H_{2}
Class	alkane	alkane	alkene	alkyne
Structure				
Hybridisation of carbon	sp^{3}	sp^{3}	sp^{2}	sp
C–H bond length	1.087 Å	1.094 Å	1.087 Å	1.060 Å
Proportion of ethane C–H bond length	99%	100%	99%	97%
Structure determination method	microwave spectroscopy	microwave spectroscopy	microwave spectroscopy	infrared spectroscopy

== Reactions ==
The C−H bond in general is very strong, so it is relatively unreactive. In several compound classes, collectively called carbon acids, the C−H bond can be sufficiently acidic for proton removal. Unactivated C−H bonds are found in alkanes and are not adjacent to a heteroatom (O, N, Si, etc.). Such bonds usually only participate in radical substitution. Many enzymes are known, however, to effect these reactions.

Although the C−H bond is one of the strongest, it varies over 30% in magnitude for fairly stable organic compounds, even in the absence of heteroatoms.

Bond	Hydrocarbon radical	Molar Bond Dissociation Energy (kcal)	Molar Bond Dissociation Energy (kJ)
CH_{3}−H	Methyl	104	440
C_{2}H_{5}−H	Ethyl	98	410
(CH_{3})_{2}HC−H	Isopropyl	95	400
(CH_{3})_{3}C−H	tert-Butyl	93	390
CH_{2}=CH−H	vinyl	112	470
HC≡C−H	ethynyl	133	560
C_{6}H_{5}−H	phenyl	110	460
CH_{2}=CHCH_{2}−H	Allyl	88	370
C_{6}H_{5}CH_{2}−H	Benzyl	85	360
OC_{4}H_{7}−H	tetrahydrofuranyl	92	380
CH_{3}C(O)CH_{2}−H	acetonyl	96	400

== See also ==
- Carbon–carbon bond
- Carbon–nitrogen bond
- Carbon–oxygen bond
- Carbon–fluorine bond
