= Dichlorodifluoromethane =

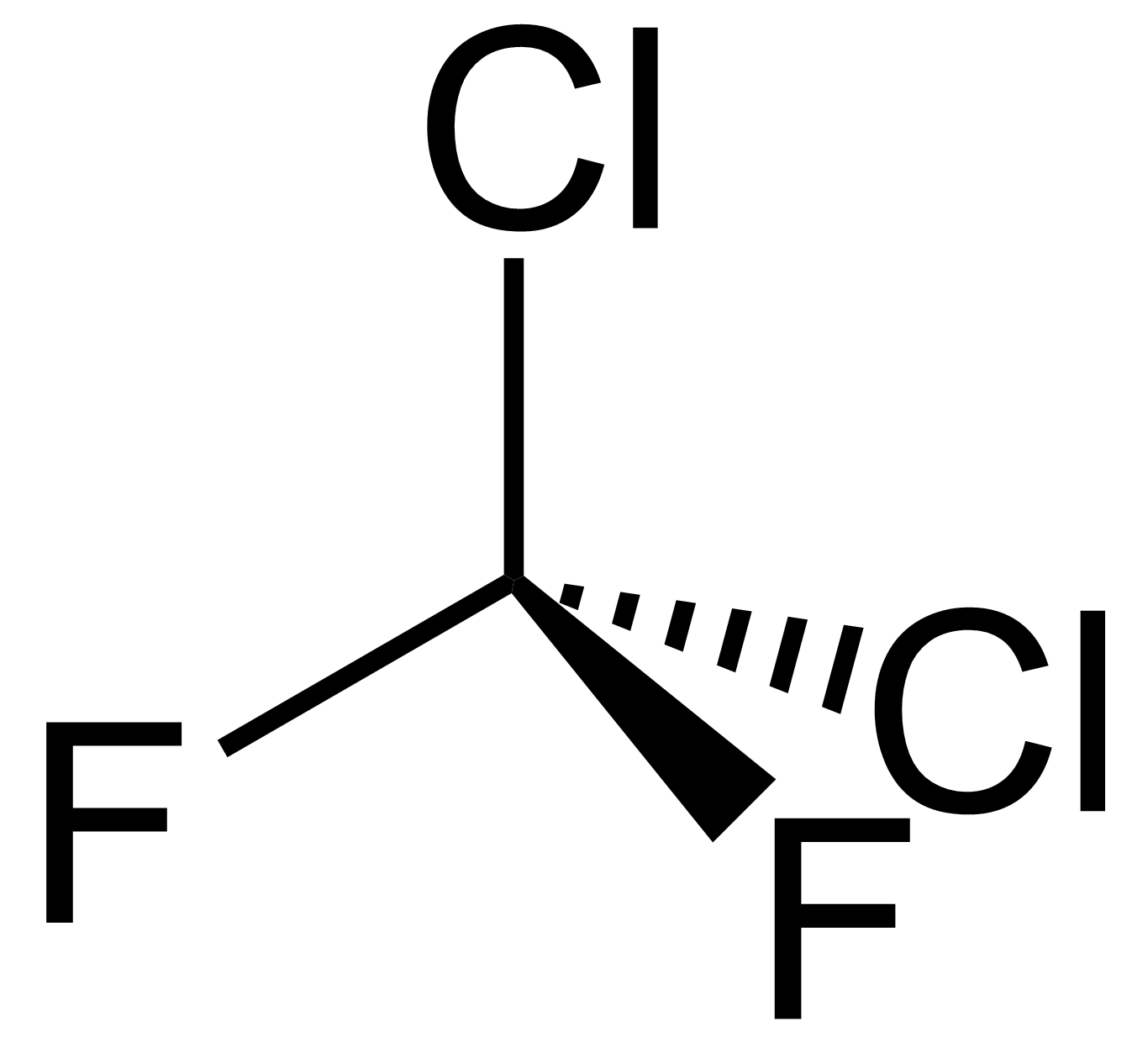

Names
- Preferred IUPAC name Dichlorodi(fluoro)methane
- Other names: Dichlorodifluoromethane; Carbon dichloride difluoride; Dichloro-difluoro-methane; Difluorodichloromethane; Freon 12; R-12; CFC-12; P-12; Propellant 12; Halon 122; Arcton 6; Arcton 12; E940; Fluorocarbon 12; Genetron 12; Refrigerant 12

Identifiers
CAS Number	75-71-8
3D model (JSmol)	Interactive image
ChEMBL	ChEMBL2106634
ChemSpider	6151
ECHA InfoCard	100.000.813
EC Number	200-893-9
E number	E940 (glazing agents, ...)
KEGG	D03789
PubChem CID	6391
RTECS number	PA8200000
UNII	OFM06SG1KO
UN number	1028
CompTox Dashboard (EPA)	DTXSID6020436
- InChI: InChI=1S/CCl2F2/c2-1(3,4)5 Key: PXBRQCKWGAHEHS-UHFFFAOYSA-N; InChI=1/CCl2F2/c2-1(3,4)5 Key: PXBRQCKWGAHEHS-UHFFFAOYAX
- SMILES: ClC(Cl)(F)F

Properties
Chemical formula	CCl_{2}F_{2}
Molar mass	120.91 g·mol^{−1}
Appearance	Colorless gas
Odor	ether-like at very high concentrations
Density	1.486 g/cm^{3} (−29.8 °C (−21.6 °F))
Melting point	−157.7 °C (−251.9 °F; 115.5 K)
Boiling point	−29.8 °C (−21.6 °F; 243.3 K)
Solubility in water	0.286 g/L at 20 °C (68 °F)
Solubility in alcohol, ether, benzene, acetic acid	Soluble
log P	2.16
Vapor pressure	568 kPa (20 °C (68 °F))
Henry's law constant (k_{H})	0.0025 mol kg^{−1} bar^{−1}
Magnetic susceptibility (χ)	−52.2·10^{−6} cm^{3}/mol
Thermal conductivity	0.0097 W/(m·K) (300 K)

Structure
Molecular shape	Tetrahedral
Dipole moment	0.51 D

Hazards
- GHS labelling
Pictograms	(GHS07: Exclamation mark)
Signal word	Warning
Hazard statements	H336, H420
Precautionary statements	P261, P271, P304+P340, P319, P403+P233, P405, P410+P403, P501, P502
NFPA 704 (fire diamond)	0 0 0
Flash point	Non-flammable
- Lethal dose or concentration (LD, LC)
LC_{50} (median concentration)	760,000 ppm (mouse, 30 min); 800,000 ppm (rabbit, 30 min); 800,000 ppm (guinea pig, 30 min); 600,000 ppm (rat, 2 h)
- NIOSH (US health exposure limits)
PEL (Permissible)	TWA 1000 ppm (4950 mg/m^{3})
REL (Recommended)	TWA 1000 ppm (4950 mg/m^{3})
IDLH (Immediate danger)	15000 ppm

Supplementary data page
- Dichlorodifluoromethane (data page)
- Except where otherwise noted, data are given for materials in their standard state (at 25 °C [77 °F], 100 kPa). verify (what is ?) Infobox references

Dichlorodifluoromethane (R-12) is a colorless gas popularly known by the genericized brand name Freon (as Freon-12). It is a chlorofluorocarbon halomethane (CFC) used as a refrigerant and aerosol spray propellant. In compliance with the Montreal Protocol, its manufacture was banned in developed countries in 1996 and developing countries in 2010 due to its damaging effect on the ozone layer. Its only allowed usage is as a fire retardant in submarines and aircraft. It is soluble in many organic solvents. Most R-12 cylinders have been colored white, but more recent standards have shifted to an off-white or metallic gray color protocol.

R-12 has the highest potential for ozone destruction of all refrigeration gases.

== Preparation ==
It can be prepared by reacting carbon tetrachloride with hydrogen fluoride in the presence of a catalytic amount of antimony pentachloride:

CCl_{4} + 2HF → CCl_{2}F_{2} + 2HCl

This reaction can also produce trichlorofluoromethane (CCl_{3}F), chlorotrifluoromethane (CClF_{3}) and tetrafluoromethane (CF_{4}).

== History ==
Charles F. Kettering, vice president of General Motors Research Corporation, was seeking a refrigerant replacement that would be colorless, odorless, tasteless, nontoxic, and nonflammable. He assembled a team that included Thomas Midgley Jr., Albert Leon Henne, and Robert McNary. From 1930 to 1935, they developed dichlorodifluoromethane (CCl_{2}F_{2} or R12), trichlorofluoromethane (CCl_{3}F or R11), chlorodifluoromethane (CHClF_{2} or R22), trichlorotrifluoroethane (CCl_{2}FCClF_{2} or R113), and dichlorotetrafluoroethane (CClF_{2}CClF_{2} or R114), through Kinetic Chemicals which was a joint venture between DuPont and General Motors.

== Use as an aerosol ==
The use of chlorofluorocarbons as aerosols in medicine, such as metered-dose inhalers, has been phased out by the U.S. Food and Drug Administration. A different propellant known as hydrofluoroalkane, or HFA, which was not known to harm the environment, was chosen to replace it. However, it remains on the FDA's approved food additive list.

CAS Reg. No. (or other ID)*:	75-71-8

== Environmental effects ==
R-12 has the highest ozone depletion potential among chlorocarbons due to the presence of 2 chlorine atoms in the molecule. R-12 also has intense global warming potential (GWP) with the 20yr, 100yr and 500yr GWP being 11400, 11200 and 5100 times greater than CO_{2}.

== Retrofitting ==
R-12 was used in most refrigeration and vehicle air conditioning applications prior to 1994 before being replaced by 1,1,1,2-tetrafluoroethane (R-134a), which has a much lower ozone depletion potential. When older units leak or require repair involving removal of the refrigerant, retrofitment to a refrigerant other than R-12 (most commonly R-134a) is required in some jurisdictions. The United States does not require such conversion. Retrofitment requires a system flush and a new filter/dryer or accumulator, and may also involve the installation of new seals and/or hoses made of materials compatible with the refrigerant being installed. Mineral oil used with R-12 is not compatible with R-134a. Some oils designed for conversion to R-134a are advertised as compatible with residual R-12 mineral oil. Replacements for R-12 include highly flammable hydrocarbon blends such as HC-12a, the flammability of which has caused injuries and deaths.

== Dangers ==
Aside from its environmental impacts, R12, like most chlorofluoroalkanes, forms phosgene gas when exposed to a naked flame. When packaged in cans under high pressure in liquid form, exposure to heat could cause the can to explode.

== Properties ==
Table of thermal and physical properties of saturated liquid refrigerant 12:

Temperature (°C)	Density (kg/m^{3})	Specific heat (kJ/kg K)	Kinematic viscosity (m^{2}/s)	Conductivity (W/m K)	Thermal diffusivity (m^{2}/s)	Prandtl Number	Bulk modulus (K^{−1})
−50	1546.75	0.875	3.10×10^{−7}	0.067	5.01×10^{−1}	6.2	2.63×10^{−3}
−40	1518.71	0.8847	2.79×10^{−7}	0.069	5.14×10^{−1}	5.4	—N/a
−30	1489.56	0.8956	2.53×10^{−7}	0.069	5.26×10^{−1}	4.8	—N/a
−20	1460.57	0.9073	2.35×10^{−7}	0.071	5.39×10^{−1}	4.4	—N/a
−10	1429.49	0.9203	2.21×10^{−7}	0.073	5.50×10^{−1}	4	—N/a
0	1397.45	0.9345	2.14×10^{−7}	0.073	5.57×10^{−1}	3.8	—N/a
10	1364.3	0.9496	2.03×10^{−7}	0.073	5.60×10^{−1}	3.6	—N/a
20	1330.18	0.9659	1.98×10^{−7}	0.073	5.60×10^{−1}	3.5	—N/a
30	1295.1	0.9835	1.94×10^{−7}	0.071	5.60×10^{−1}	3.5	—N/a
40	1257.13	1.0019	1.91×10^{−7}	0.069	5.55×10^{−1}	3.5	—N/a
50	1215.96	1.0216	1.90×10^{−7}	0.067	5.45×10^{−1}	3.5	—N/a

== Gallery ==
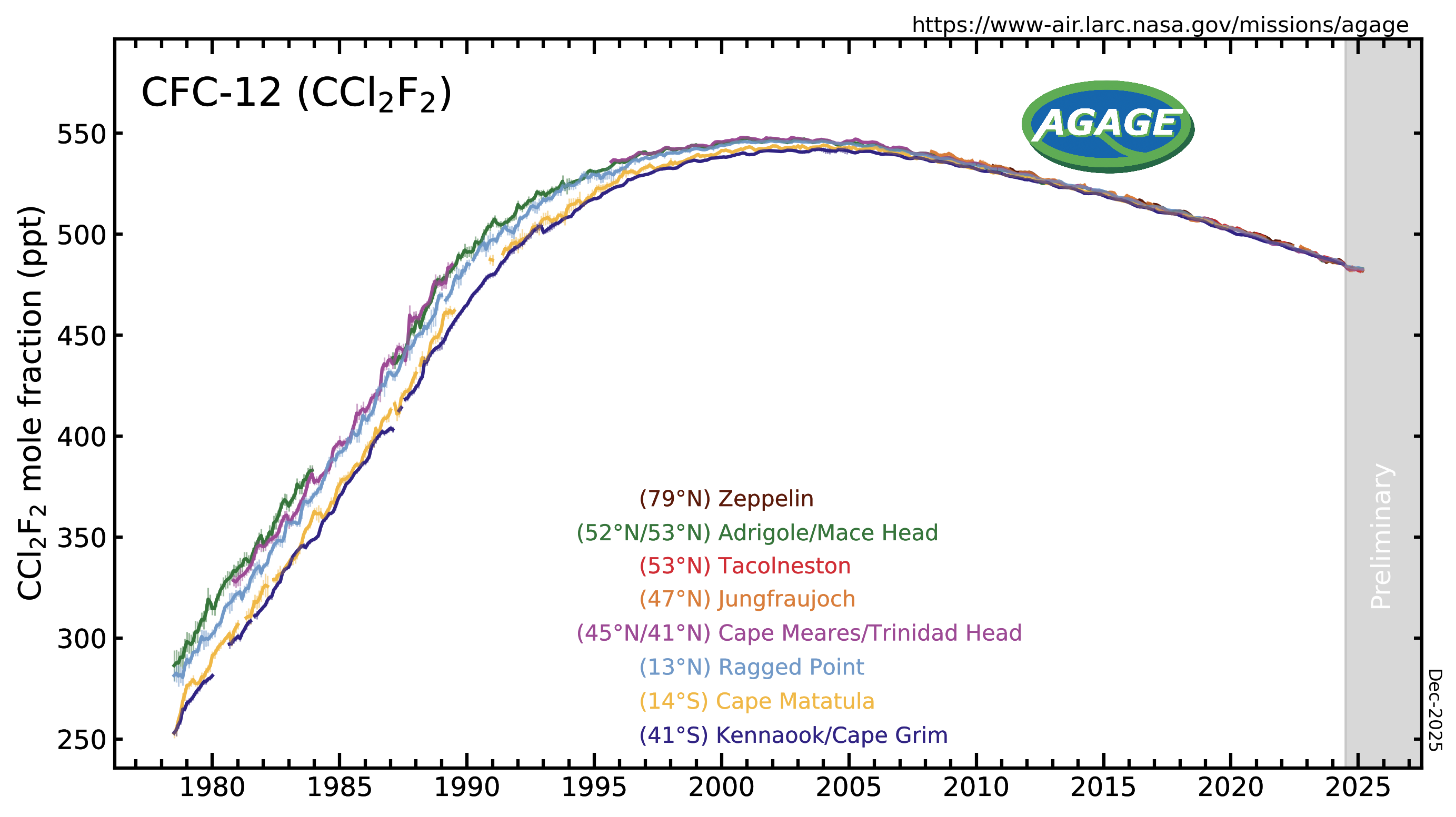
CFC-12 measured by the Advanced Global Atmospheric Gases Experiment (AGAGE) in the lower atmosphere (troposphere) at stations around the world. Abundances are given as pollution free monthly mean mole fractions in parts-per-trillion.

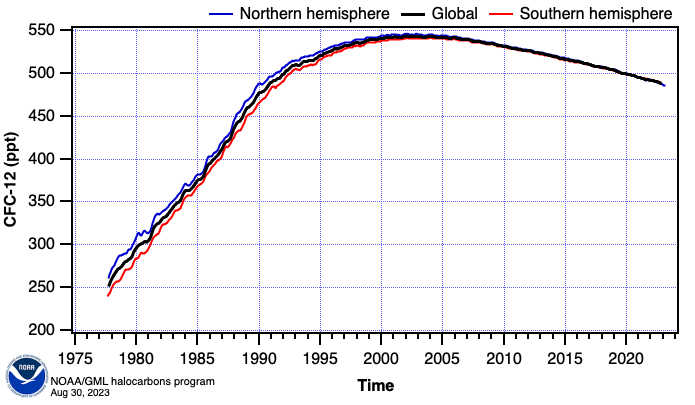
Hemispheric and global mean CFC-12 concentrations (NOAA/ESRL)

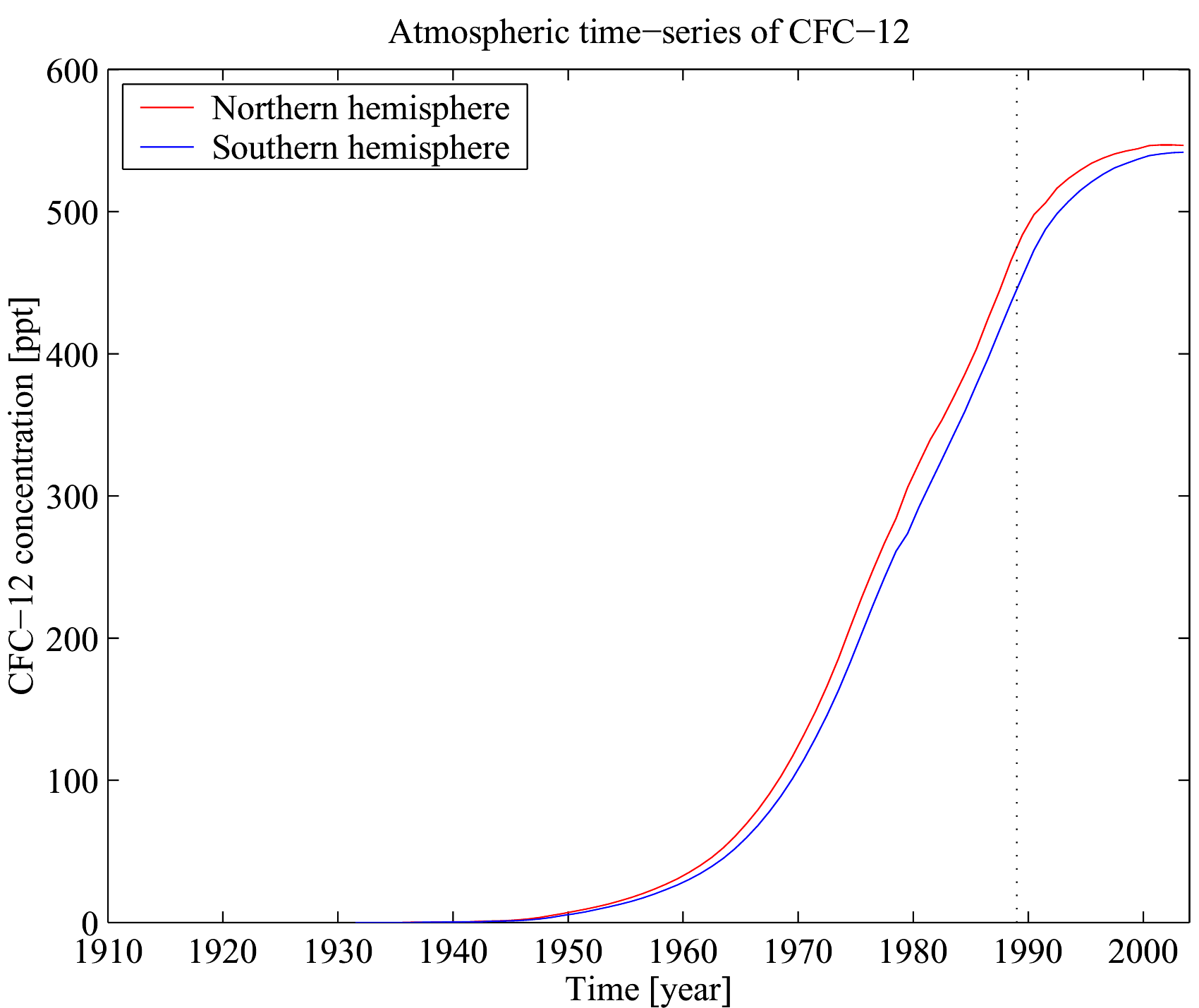
Time-series of atmospheric concentrations of CFC-12 (Walker et al., 2000)

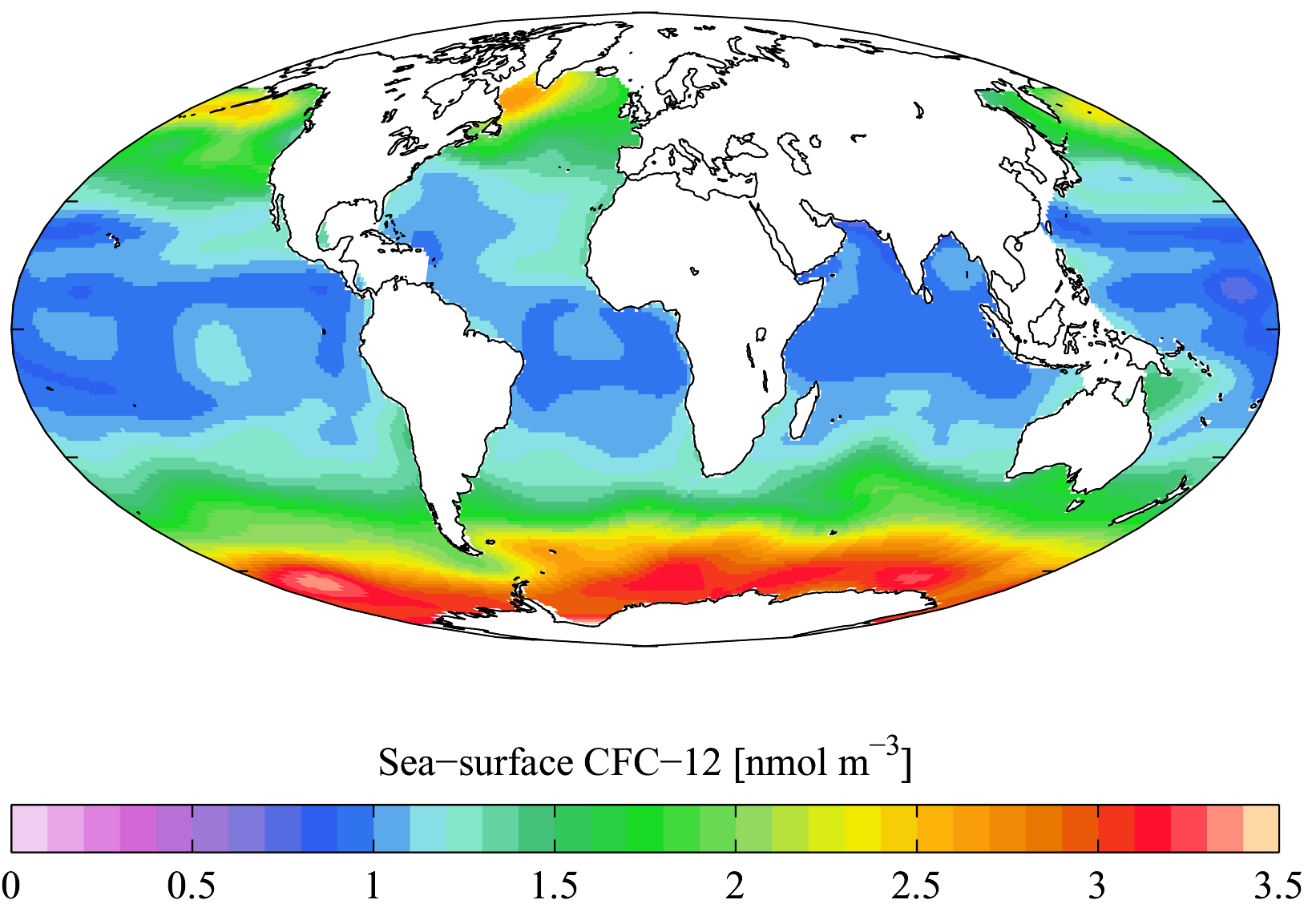
1990s sea surface CFC-12 concentration

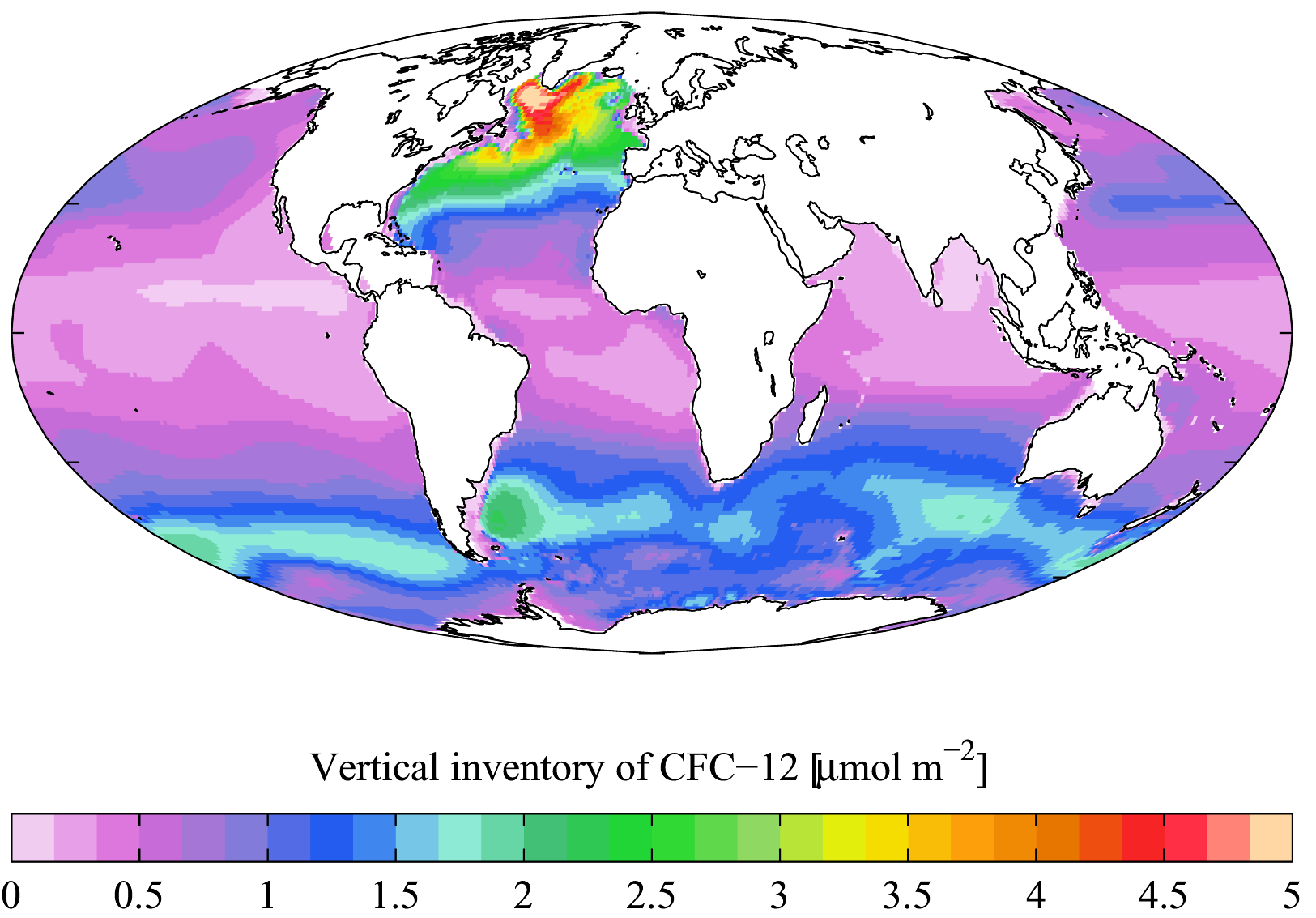
1990s CFC-12 oceanic vertical inventory

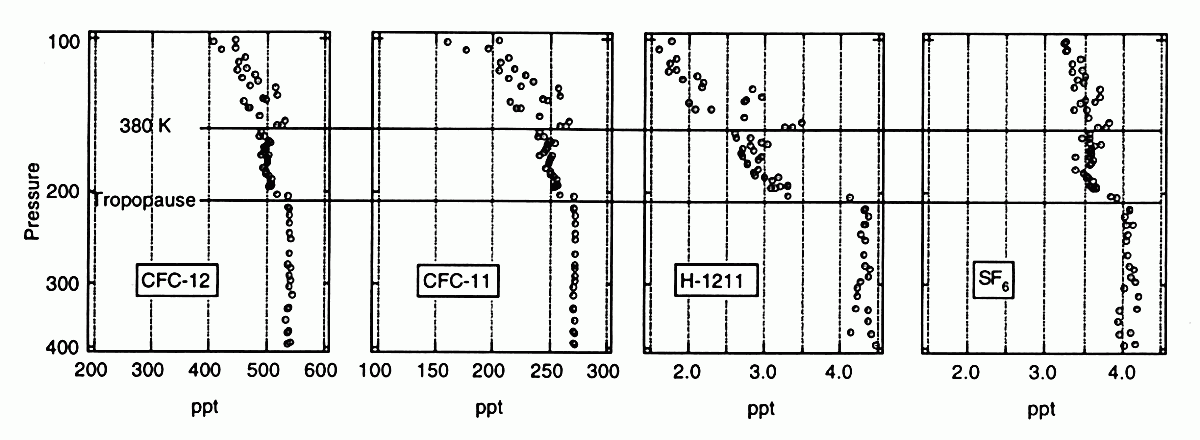
CFC-12, CFC-11, H-1211 and SF_{6} vertical profiles
