= Ishikawa reagent =

Fluorinating reagent used in organic chemistry

Ishikawa's reagent is a mixture of N,N-diethyl-(1,1,2,3,3,3-hexafluoropropyl)amine (left) and N,N-diethyl-(E)-pentafluoropropenylamine (right)

Ishikawa's reagent is a fluorinating reagent used in organic chemistry. It is used to convert alcohols into alkyl fluorides and carboxylic acids into acyl fluorides. Aldehydes and ketones do not react with it. The reagent consists of a mixture of N,N-diethyl-(1,1,2,3,3,3-hexafluoropropyl)amine and N,N-diethyl-(E)-pentafluoropropenylamine in varying proportions. The active species is the hexafluoropropylamine; any enamine is converted into this by the hydrogen fluoride byproduct as the reaction proceeds.

Ishikawa's reagent is a popular alternative to diethylaminosulfur trifluoride (DAST), since it is shelf-stable and easily prepared from inexpensive and innocuous reagents. It is an improvement on Yarovenko's reagent, the adduct of chlorotrifluoroethylene and diethylamine, which must be prepared in a sealed vessel and once prepared keeps only for a few days, even in the refrigerator.

The reagent is mostly used to convert primary alcohols to alkyl fluorides under mild conditions with high yield. However, secondary and tertiary alcohols give a substantial amount of alkenes and ethers as side products.

== Synthesis ==
The compound is prepared by adding hexafluoropropene to a solution of diethylamine in ether at 0 °C and distilling the product in vacuo. The amount of enamine in the product depends on temperature control during the reaction — the higher the temperature the more enamine.
