= Diethylaminosulfur trifluoride =

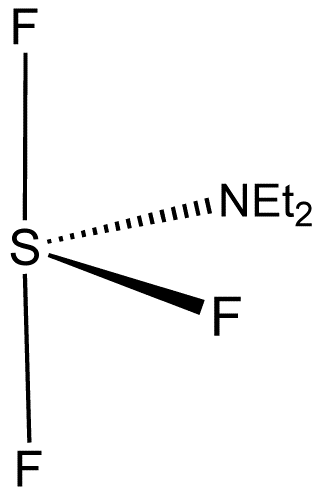

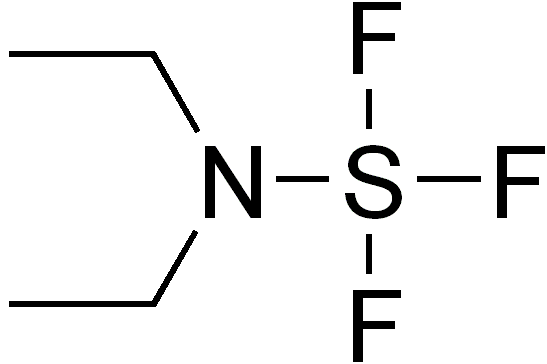

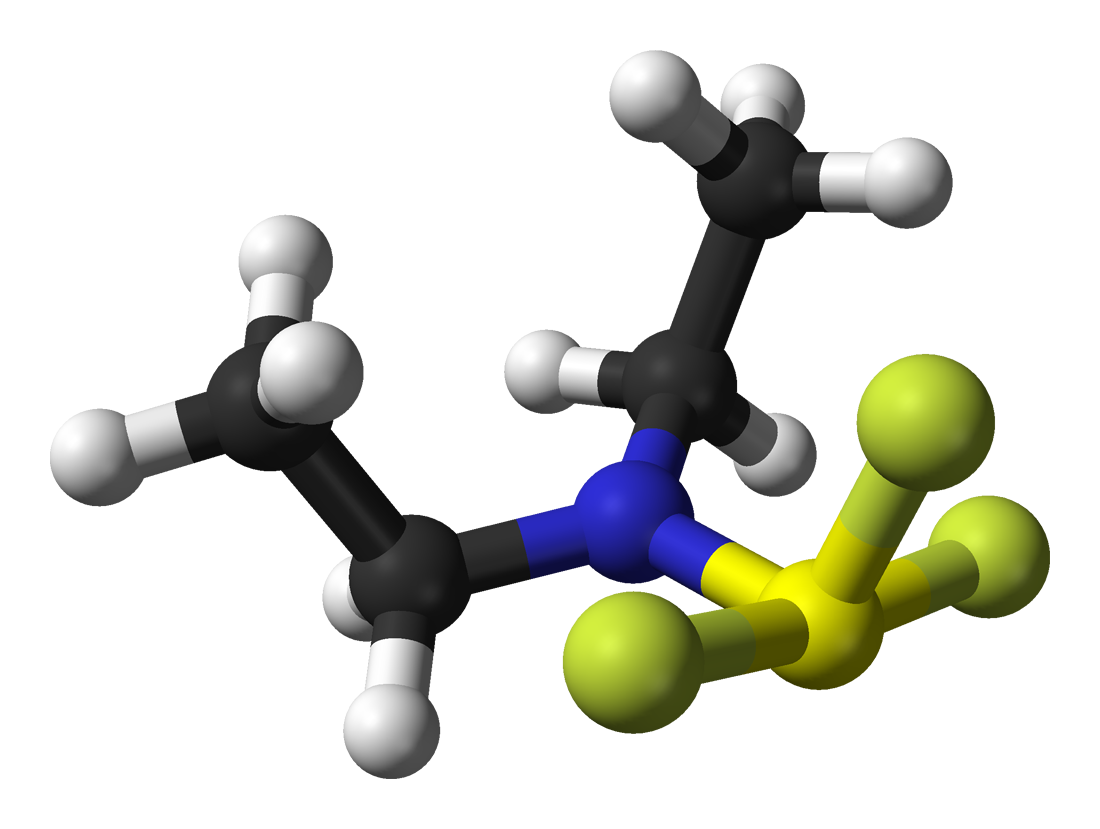

Names
- Preferred IUPAC name N,N-Diethyl-S,S,S-trifluoro-λ^{4}-sulfanamine
- Other names diethyl(trifluorosulfido)amine

Identifiers
CAS Number	38078-09-0
3D model (JSmol)	Interactive image; Interactive image
Abbreviations	DAST
ChemSpider	110068
ECHA InfoCard	100.048.866
EC Number	253-771-2
PubChem CID	123472
UNII	78622BV6IJ
CompTox Dashboard (EPA)	DTXSID20191484
- InChI: InChI=1S/3C4H12NS.3FH/c3*1-3-6(5)4-2;;;/h3*3-5H2,1-2H3;3*1H/q3*+1;;;/p-3 Key: OJRFYRBETDFODT-UHFFFAOYSA-K; InChI=1/3C4H12NS.3FH/c3*1-3-6(5)4-2;;;/h3*3-5H2,1-2H3;3*1H/q3*+1;;;/p-3 Key: OJRFYRBETDFODT-DFZHHIFOAR
- SMILES: FS(F)(F)N(CC)CC; [F-].[F-].[F-].N[S+](CC)CC.CC[S+](N)CC.CC[S+](N)CC

Properties
Chemical formula	C_{4}H_{10}F_{3}NS
Molar mass	161.19 g·mol^{−1}
Appearance	colourless oil
Density	1.220 g/cm^{3}
Boiling point	30 to 32 °C (86 to 90 °F; 303 to 305 K) at 3 mmHg
Solubility in water	Reacts with water
Solubility	reacts with ethanol soluble in acetonitrile

Hazards
- Occupational safety and health (OHS/OSH)
Main hazards	corrosive, flammable, can be explosive
- GHS labelling
Pictograms	(GHS02: Flammable) (GHS05: Corrosive) (GHS07: Exclamation mark)
Signal word	Danger
Hazard statements	H226, H302, H312, H314, H332
Precautionary statements	P210, P233, P240, P241, P242, P243, P260, P264, P270, P271, P280, P301+P312, P301+P330+P331, P302+P352, P303+P361+P353, P304+P312, P304+P340, P305+P351+P338, P310, P312, P321, P322, P330, P363, P370+P378, P403+P235, P405, P501
- Except where otherwise noted, data are given for materials in their standard state (at 25 °C [77 °F], 100 kPa). verify (what is ?) Infobox references

Diethylaminosulfur trifluoride (DAST) is the organosulfur compound with the formula Et_{2}NSF_{3}. This liquid is a fluorinating reagent used for the synthesis of organofluorine compounds. The compound is colourless; older samples assume an orange colour.

== Use in organic synthesis ==
DAST converts alcohols to the corresponding alkyl fluorides as well as aldehydes and unhindered ketones to geminal difluorides. Carboxylic acids react no further than the acyl fluoride. Sulfur tetrafluoride, SF_{4}, effects the same transformation but will also convert the acyl fluoride to the trifluoromethyl derivative. For laboratory-scale operations, DAST is used in preference to SF_{4}, which is far less expensive but less easily handled. A slightly thermally more stable compound is morpho-DAST. Acid-labile substrates are less likely to undergo rearrangement and elimination since DAST is less prone to contamination with acids. Reaction temperatures are milder as well – alcohols typically react at −78 °C and ketones around 0 °C.

== Synthesis ==
DAST is prepared by the reaction of diethylaminotrimethylsilane and sulfur tetrafluoride:

Et_{2}NSiMe_{3} + SF_{4} → Et_{2}NSF_{3} + Me_{3}SiF

The original paper calls for trichlorofluoromethane (Freon-11) as a solvent. Diethyl ether is a green alternative that can be used with no decrease in yield. Because of the dangers involved in the preparation of DAST (glass etching, possibility of exothermic events), it is often purchased from a commercial source. At one time Carbolabs was one of the few suppliers of the chemical but a number of companies now sell DAST. Carbolabs was acquired by Sigma-Aldrich in 1998.

== Safety and alternative reagents ==
Upon heating, DAST converts to the highly explosive (NEt_{2})_{2}SF_{2} with expulsion of sulfur tetrafluoride. To minimize accidents, samples are maintained below 50 °C. Bis-(2-methoxyethyl)aminosulfur trifluoride (trade name: Deoxo-Fluor) and difluoro(morpholino)sulfonium tetrafluoroborate (trade name: XtalFluor-M) are reagents related to DAST with less explosive potential. XtalFluor-E has been jointly developed by OmegaChem Inc. and Manchester Organics Ltd. in 2009–2010.

== See also ==
- Ishikawa reagent
- Fluorination with aminosulfuranes
