= Biological Institute of TSU =

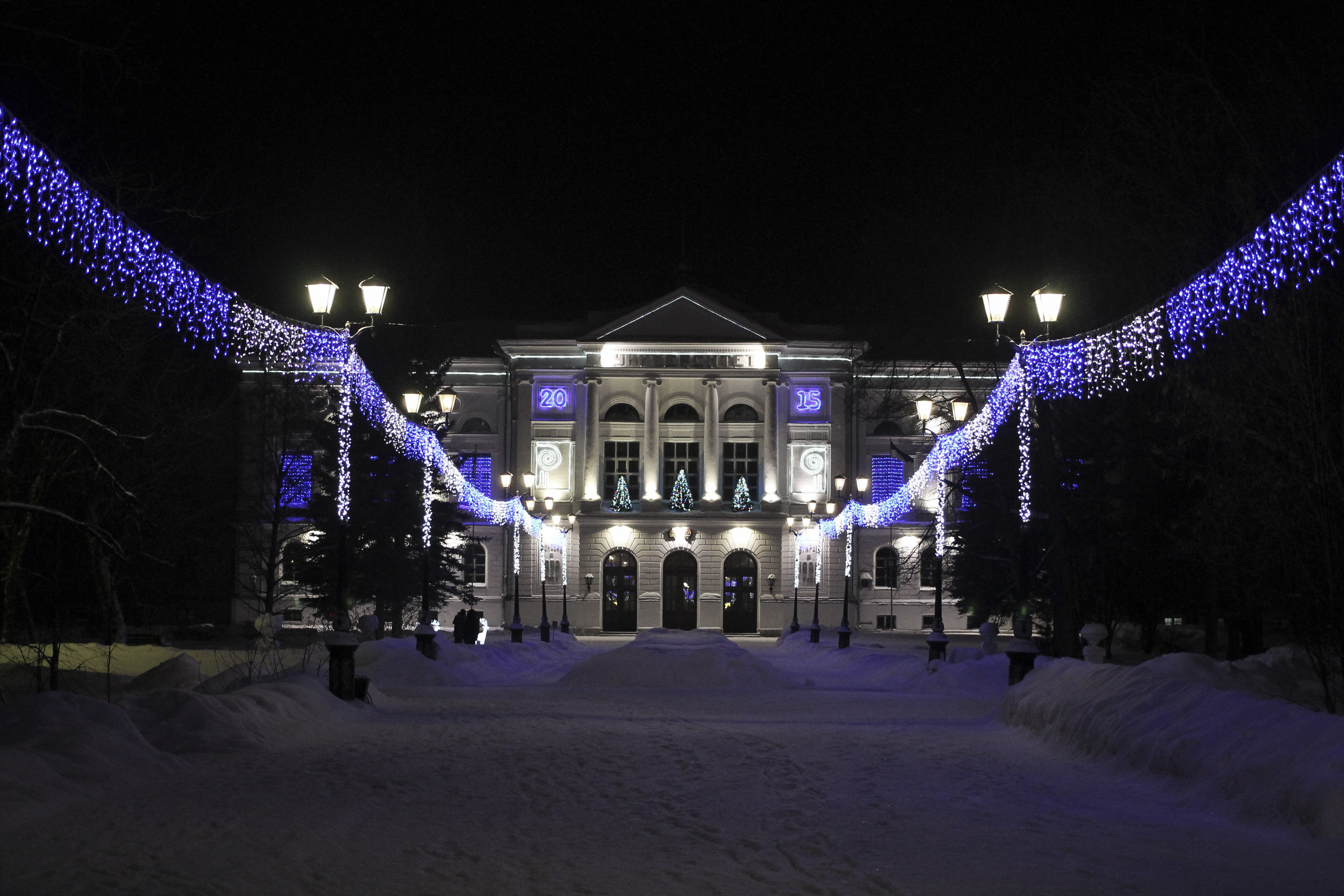
- Abbreviation: BIO TSU
- Formation: 1885
- Type: Non-profit
- Purpose: Biology, Biological Sciences, and other fields in Conservation
- Location: Tomsk, Russia
- Region served: National
- Director: Danil Vorobiev
- Website: http://bio.tsu.ru

Biological Institute of Tomsk State University (BIO TSU) in past, the faculty of Biology of TSU, one of the oldest faculties, whose work began in 1885, three years before the official opening of the university.

== History ==
The biology work in Tomsk State University began in 1885 when a botanist Porfiri Krylov arrived to Tomsk from Kazan University. Immediately upon arrival, this energetic person proceeded to create the first Botanical Garden in Siberia and Herbarium, while doing exceptionally large organizational work.

== Overview ==
Currently, the Biological Institute has a highly qualified human resources, a strong material base and significant prospects for realizing the potential of each student and employee.

=== Teaching ===
Today, there are about 700 students, 220 undergraduates, 40 Doctors of science have work and study in the Biological Institute. It provides training in 7 areas:

- Biology
- Soil science
- Forestry
- Landscape architecture
- Ecology and nature management
- Agronomy
- Biodiversity – international MSc

=== Research ===
Research work takes a significant part in the activities of the Biological Institute. The active involvement of students and young scientists makes it possible to achieve incredible successes. The most significant areas of scientific research projects:

- The research project "BIO — CLIM — LAND" which aims at a comprehensive study of the dynamics of species diversity in conditions of habitat extremization in latitudinal and high — altitude gradients of periglacial zones of Siberia. This project is aimed at studying the regularities of the formation of biological diversity in the Tundra and highland zones of the Siberia.
- Unique technology for cleaning bottom sediments of water bodies from oil and petroleum product. Team of specialists of the Institute is the Russia's leading in integrated water cleaning (bottom sediment and water) from oil and petroleum pollution

=== Interesting Facts ===
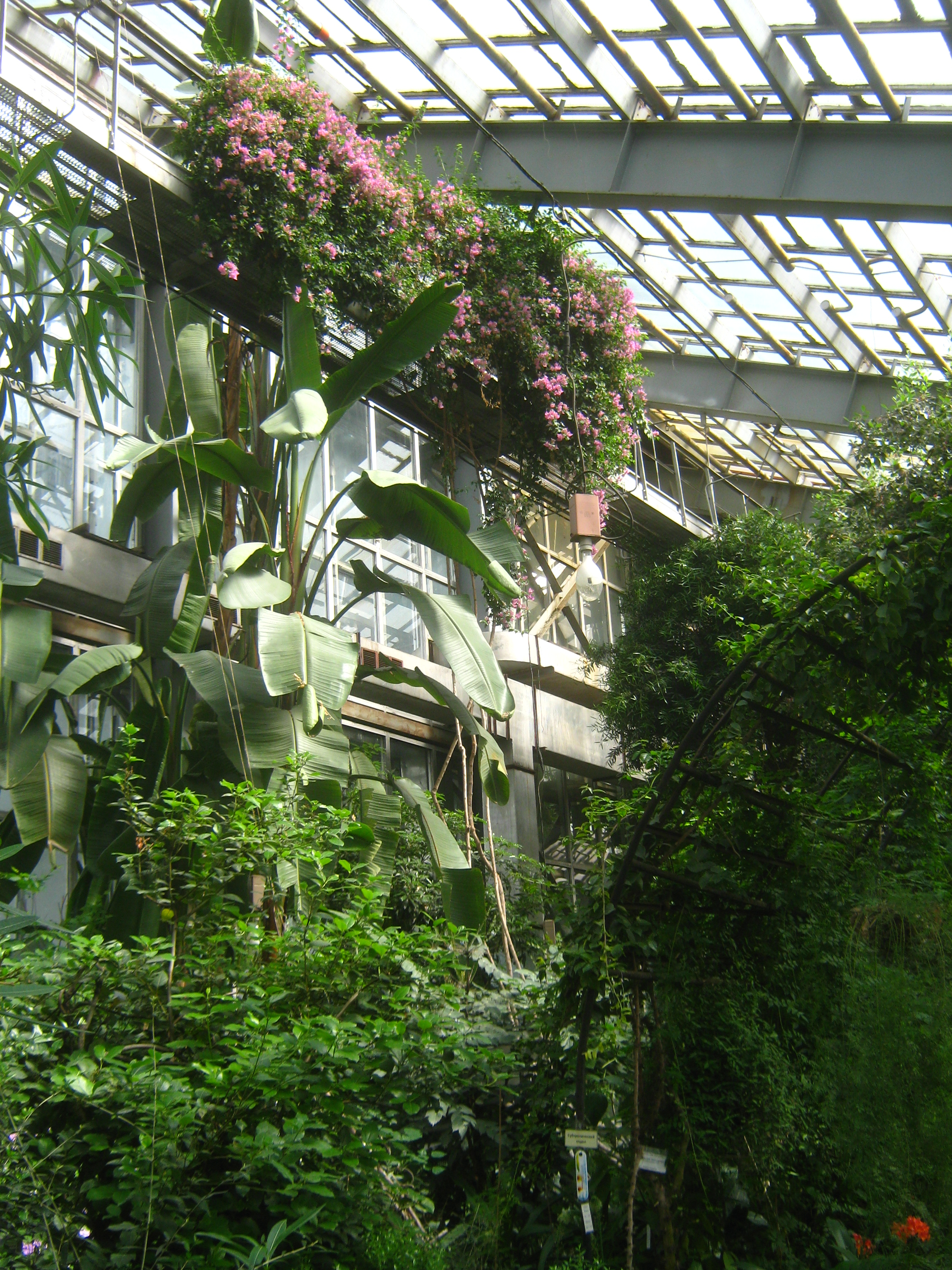
Siberian Botanical Garden

- The Siberian Botanical Garden of TSU is a largest botanical research institution in Siberia. Plant funds include about 8000 species, forms and varieties, about 4000 of which are tropical and subtropical plants represented in the greenhouses of the garden. In the open ground, there are decorative trees and shrub plants — 773 species and varieties, ornamental grassy — 2391, medical — 358, fruit and berry — 359, fodder — 536, vegetable — 475, rare and endangered - 335 species. The number of employees is 85 people. Here there are 46 specialists with higher education, including 2 doctors and 11 PhD.
- The Zoological Museum of TSU was founded in 1887, when the first exhibits began to arrive. The collection's basis of animals in the Arctic Ocean, made by an expedition of the famous polar explorer and scientist Niels Adolf Erik Nordenskiold during a through voyage from the Atlantic to the Pacific Ocean on the steamer Vega. Today, the volumes of the collections collected in the museum are about 120 thousand copies. The greatest value is a scientific collection (35 thousand units of storage), which includes: carcasses of mammals — 7.5 thousand; bird carcasses — 17 thousand; osteological collection — 3 thousand; conchological — 1 thousand. There are also collections of reptiles, amphibians and invertebrates, represented by both wet and dry preparations.

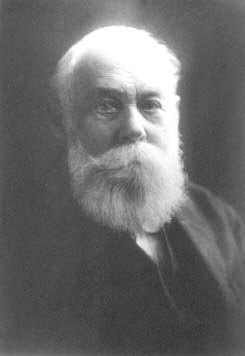
Porfiry Krylov

- The Herbarium of TSU was founded by Porfiry Krylov in 1885 as the Botanical Museum of the Imperial Tomsk University. There are more than 500 thousand samples in the modern Herbarium fund. Herbarium of TSU is included in the number of the largest Herbariums of Russia and is the third in the system of higher education. The herbarium contains mainly vascular plants. The collection fund is divided into 13 divisions. The largest are the departments of Western Siberia, Prieniseyskoy Siberia, Eastern Siberia, Tuva and Mongolia, Central Asia, the main collection (includes herbarium specimens collected outside Siberia and Central Asia). In addition, Herbarium has a library of special botanical literature. For all the time of the Herbarium existence the library has been constantly replenished and by now there are about 30 thousand publications, among which there are very valuable works of the botany classics of the 18th — early 19th centuries. C. Linnaeus, J.Gmelin, P.Pallas, C. Ledebour, N. Turczaninow and the largest reports on the flora of the world A. de Candolle, A. Engler, and others.
