= Håkon Flood =

Norwegian chemist pioneer of molten salt chemistry

Håkon Flood (25 September 1905 – 9 October 2001) was a professor of inorganic chemistry at the Norwegian Institute of Technology in Trondheim, Norway, from 1953 to 1975. He also worked as the director of the Institute of Silicate Research (Institutt for Silikatforskning) at NTH. Professor Flood was one of the pioneers of molten salt chemistry and, together with Hermann Lux, is known for the Lux–Flood theory of acid–base reactions.
