= Dimethyl-sulfide monooxygenase =

Class of enzymes

Identifiers
- EC no.: 1.14.13.131

Databases
- IntEnz: IntEnz view
- BRENDA: BRENDA entry
- ExPASy: NiceZyme view
- KEGG: KEGG entry
- MetaCyc: metabolic pathway
- PRIAM: profile
- PDB structures: RCSB PDB PDBe PDBsum
Search
- PMC: articles
- PubMed: articles
- NCBI: proteins

Dimethyl-sulfide monooxygenase (EC 1.14.13.131, dimethylsulfide monooxygenase) is an enzyme with systematic name dimethyl sulfide,NADH:oxygen oxidoreductase. This enzyme catalyses the following chemical reaction

dimethyl sulfide + O_{2} + NADH + H^{+} $\rightleftharpoons$ methanethiol + formaldehyde + NAD^{+} + H_{2}O

Dimethyl-sulfide monooxygenase has lower activity with diethyl sulfide and other short-chain alkyl methyl sulfides.
