= Lidia Palladievna Sergievskaya =

Soviet Russian botanist (1897–1970)

Lidia Palladievna Sergievskaya (1897 – 1970) was a Soviet Russian botanist, professor and herbarium curator. She described hundreds of plants. The standard author abbreviation Serg. is used to indicate this person as the author when citing a botanical name.

== Biography ==
She was born into a priest's family. She graduated from the Tomsk Diocesan School.

In 1920, she graduated from the natural sciences department of the physics and mathematics faculty of the Siberian Higher Courses for Women. From 1921, she worked as a junior herbarium keeper at Tomsk State University (TSU), the oldest university in Siberia. From 1931, she was senior keeper of the Tomsk University Herbarium. Candidate of biological sciences (1938), associate professor of the plant taxonomy department of TSU (1942). She became a Doctor of biological sciences in 1954, and began teaching in the botany department as an associate professor, and since 1956 she was a professor. She supervised three PhD candidates.

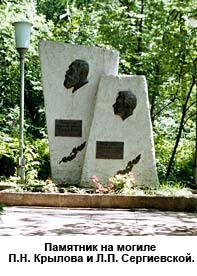
A monument at the grave of Lydia Sergievskaya and Porfiry Krylov on the grounds of the Siberian Botanical Garden.

As a student of Porfiry Krylov, she helped collect materials for the 6-volume work "Flora of Western Siberia". She studied Siberian plants, including the larkspur. She described 241 new plant taxa, including (Eritrichium uralense Serg., 1964).

During the Great Patriotic War (1941–1945), she oriented the work of the Herbarium towards the procurement of medicinal raw materials and went on three special missions to Transbaikalia. She was a devoted vegetarian.

She was awarded the Order of Lenin, the medals “For Valiant Labor in the Great Patriotic War of 1941–1945 ” and “ In Commemoration of the 100th Anniversary of the Birth of Vladimir Ilyich Lenin”.

Her portrait is included the portrait gallery of Honorary TCU Professors.

She died on 21 September 1970 and was buried in the University Grove of Tomsk State University.

== Plant species named in her honor ==
- Achillea sergievskiana, Shaulo & Shmakov, 2002
- Alchemilla lydiae, Zämelis, 1932
- Alyssum sergievskajae, Krasnob., 1975 = Stevenia sergievskajae (Krasnob.) Kamelin & Gubanov
- Cuscuta elpassiana, Pavlov, 1952
- Equisetum ×sergijevskianum, C.N.Page & Gureyeva, 2009 (Equisetum palustre × Equisetum pratense )
- Glycyrrhiza sergievskiana, Grankina & Aralbaev, 2006
- Hieracium lydiae, Schischk. & Steinb., 1949 = Pilosella lydiae (Schischk. & Steinb.)] Tupitz.
- Lotus sergievskiae, Kamelin & Kovalevsk., 1981
- Poa sergievskajae, Prob., 1971
- Potentilla lydiae, Kurbatsky, 1985
- Potentilla sergievskajae, Peschkova, 1970
- Rosa sergievskiana, Polozhij & Prozorova, 1975
- Thymus sergievskajae, Karav., 1971
- Torularia sergievskiana, Polozhij, 1974
- Veronica sergievskiana, Polozhij, 1997
