= Pyotr Lyashchenko =

Russian economist (1876 1955)

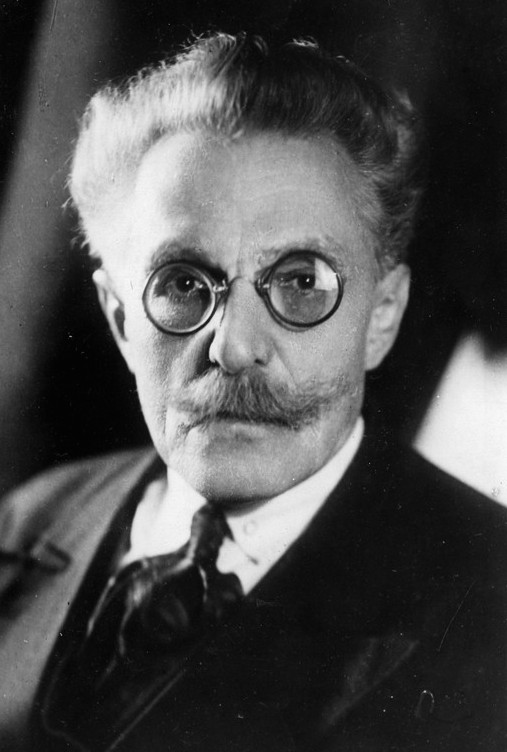
- Born: Pyotr Ivanovich Lyashchenko; October 22, 1876; Saratov, Russian Empire
- Died: July 24, 1955 (aged 78); Moscow, Soviet Union
- Occupation: Economist
- Awards: Stalin Prize

Pyotr Ivanovich Lyashchenko (Russian: Пётр Иванович Лященко; 22 October 1876 – 24 July 1955) was a Russian and Soviet economist and a specialist in the field of economy, agriculture and history of the national economy of Russia and the Soviet Union. Professor Lyashchenko was the rector of Tomsk Imperial University in 1916.

== Biography ==
Pyotr Ivanovich Lyashchenko was born in Saratov. In 1894, he graduated from the 1st Saratov Classical Gymnasium.

He graduated with honors from the Faculty of Physics and Mathematics (1899) and from the Economics Department of the Faculty of Law (1900) of St. Petersburg Imperial University. In 1900—1901, he trained at the University of Leipzig and at the Agricultural Institute. Privat-docent of the Agricultural Institute (1903—1908). He lectured on political economy, agrarian problems and statistics at the Faculty of Law (1908, 1910-1913). In 1910, he worked at Yuryev University. In 1913—1917, he was a Professor of Tomsk Imperial University (Department of Political Economy), where in 1914—1917, he was the Dean of Law Faculty. In 1914, he defended his Master thesis in agriculture at Kharkiv Imperial University. In June 1916, he served as Rector of Tomsk Imperial University. After a conflict with part of the faculty professors in May 1917, he moved to Warsaw (Rostov) University.

After the October Revolution, he did scientific and pedagogical work in Rostov-on-Don (Professor of Rostov State University; in 1918—1922 — Rector of the Don Institute of National Economy), in Moscow (Institute of Red Professors, Moscow State University, Institute of Economics of USSR Academy of Sciences), and in Kyiv (senior researcher of the Institute economy of the Ukrainian Academy of Sciences). In 1949, he was awarded Stalin Prize for his work "History of the National Economy of the USSR" (3rd volume was published posthumously).

Lyashchenko died on 24 July 1955 in Moscow and was buried at Vagankovo Cemetery.
