= Mikhail Usanovich =

- Born: 16 June 1894; Zhytomyr, Russian Empire
- Died: 15 June 1981 (aged 86); Almaty, Kazakh SSR, Soviet Union
- Education: Saint Vladimir Imperial University of Kiev
- Scientific career
- Fields: Chemistry
- Workplaces: Tomsk State University, Central Asian State University, Kazakh State University

Michail Illyich Usanovich (1894—1981) was a Ukrainian/Soviet physical chemist, and an academician of the Academy of Sciences of Kazakh SSR since 1962. He is famous for his generalized acid-base theory.

Michail Usanovich was born to a Jewish doctor's family in Zhytomyr.

After having graduated from Kiev University of Sciences in 1917, he worked in the chemical laboratory of the Academy of Sciences of Ukrainian SSR led by Vladimir Vernadsky up to 1920. He was an employee and the technologist of the Kiev Polytechnical Institute. He became a professor in three universities: Tomsk University in 1930, Central Asian State University in 1935, and Kazakh State University in 1944, where he held an academic chair.

== Main scientific works ==
Mikhail Usanovich developed a number of theories and proved a number of facts, such as:

- Quantitative solution theory;
- Equations of non-colligative properties of solutions and their dependence on composition;
- Generalized theory of acids and bases;
- The so-called anomalous electrical conductivity Is a rule rather than an exception;
- The law of dilution is wrong for most solutions;
- Systems where chemical interactions occur at equilibrium concentrations.

== Bibliography ==
- Theory of acids and bases. Alma-Ata, 1953
- Research in the field of solutions and theory of acids and bases. Alma-Ata, 1970
