= Antonina Polozhy =

Russian botanist (1917-2003)

- Born: 12 May 1917; Tomsk, Russia
- Died: 20 November 2003 (aged 86); Tomsk, Russia
- Known for: Botanist

Antonina Polozhy (May 12, 1917 - November 20, 2003) was a Russian botanist, geneticist, taxonomist, plant breeder and specialist in Russian cultivated plants.

== Biography ==
=== Life ===
Antonina was born on May 12, 1917, in the city of Tomsk. Graduating from Tomsk State University in “Systematics of Lower Plants” in 1939, she became an assistant at the Department of Morphology and Systematics of Higher Plants at TSU three years later. In 1941 she became an assistant professor, then in 1961 she became head of the Botany Department. Continuing in the department as a professor in 1966 she was also the Dean of the Faculty of Biology and Soil. She soon became a member of the Higher Attestation Commission of the USSR as well as the Head Council of Biology at the Ministry of Higher Education of the RSFSR. From 1969 to 1998 she was the Chairman of the Tomsk branch of the Soviet Union and the Russian Botanical Society. From 1970 on she additionally headed the P.N. Krylova Herbarium at TSU. Antonina died on November 20, 2003, in Tomsk.

=== Studies ===
Throughout her life, Antonina published over 200 papers ranging though topics such as systematics, botanical geography, and botanical resource studies. Additionally she described 14 new species of plant.

== Honors ==
- Order of the Badge of Honor (1976)
- Order of Honor (1999)
- Medals for Valiant Labor in the Great Patriotic War
