= Vladimir Boldyrev (chemist) =

Russian chemist (1927–2025)

- Владимир Болдырев
- Born: Vladimir Vyacheslavovich Boldyrev; 8 April 1927; Tomsk, Siberian Krai, Russian SFSR, USSR
- Died: 9 November 2025 (aged 98)
- Education: Tomsk State University
- Occupation: Chemist

Vladimir Vyacheslavovich Boldyrev (Russian: Влади́мир Вячесла́вович Бо́лдырев; 8 April 1927 – 9 November 2025) was a Russian chemist. A member of the Russian Academy of Sciences, he was a recipient of the State Prize of the Russian Federation (1993).

Boldyrev died on 9 November 2025, at the age of 98.
