= Ioaniky Malinovsky =

Ukrainian lawyer (1868–1932)

Ioaniky Alekseyevich Malinovsky
- Иоанникий Алексеевич Малиновский (Russian)
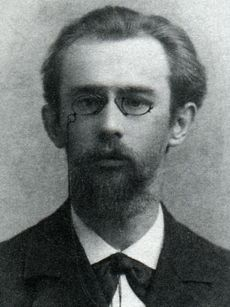
- Ioaniky Malinovsky
- Born: 4 November 1868; Ostrog, Volhynian Governorate, Russian Empire (today Ukraine)
- Died: 1 December 1932; Kiev, Ukrainian SSR, Soviet Union (today Ukraine)

Academic background
- Education: Saint Vladimir Imperial University of Kiev

Academic work
- Discipline: Law
- Institutions: Imperial University of Tomsk; Imperial University of Warsaw; Donskoy University; All-Ukrainian Academy of Sciences

Ioaniky Alekseyevich Malinovsky (Russian: Иоанникий Алексеевич Малиновский; Ukrainian: Іоанникій Олексійович Малиновский; 4 (16) November 1868 – 12 January 1932) was a jurist and historian of law active in the Russian Empire and the Soviet Union, full member of the All-Ukrainian Academy of Sciences.

== Biography ==
=== Education ===
Malinovsky was born in 1868 in Ostrog, in the family of an artisan. In his hometown he studied at the Ostrog gymnasium, later moving to Kiev to study at the Pavlo Galagan Collegium, from which he graduated in 1888. In 1892 he completed his studies in law at the St. Vladimir Imperial University of Kiev.

=== Professional activity ===
Between 1898 and 1911 he was a professor at the sub-department of History of Russian law at the Imperial University of Tomsk. While in Tomsk he served as co-editor of the newspaper Сибирская жизнь (Siberian Life), being one of the founders of the Siberian Printing Association. A progressive, his position against the death penalty led to complaints from right-wing Duma deputies and requests for him to be removed from his teaching position. A case against him went to trial at the Tomsk court after the publication of his work Кровавая месть и смертные казни (Blood Feud and the Death Penalty), a book which Lev Tolstoy, to whom Malinovsky had sent a copy, considered a demonstration of the criminality of the death penalty. While the court at Tomsk acquitted Malinovsky, the case gained publicity and an appeal was lodged by the prosecutor. Malinovsky was retried at Omsk, where the court sentenced him to a month in jail and the burning of his book. As a consequence of this trial Malinovsky was left unemployed, but the general amnesty declared on occasion of the Romanov Tercentenary helped him escape further prosecution.

In 1913 he was named extraordinary professor of History of Russian law at the Imperial University of Warsaw, where he worked until the summer of 1915, when the German Army approached Warsaw. As a response to the German advance the university was evacuated to Rostov-on-Don, where it was reformed as the Donskoy University. Malinovsky continued teaching there until he was arrested by the local Cheka on 30 June 1920, under the accusation of counter-revolutionary activity, for which he was sentenced to capital punishment on 24 July. The sentence was commuted to 15 years of imprisonment in December of the same year, and after an amnesty in May 1921 it was commuted to 5 years. In September 1921 Malinovsky was released on probation by request of the Institute of Soviet Law under the People's Commissariat of Justice of the RSFSR, where he subsequently worked.

From 1 July 1922 until February 1924 he was imprisoned in the Ivanovsky Correctional Camp in Moscow, being released by petition of the All-Ukrainian Academy of Sciences, to which he was elected a full member in April 1925. In January 1926 he moved to Kiev to begin scientific research. In 1928 he served as chairman of the Soviet Commission of Criminal Law, but in 1930 he was dismissed from his positions and expelled from the All-Ukrainian Academy of Sciences. He died forgotten and in poverty in 1932.

In 1992 Malinovsky was posthumously rehabilitated from the charges levied against him and restored to the list of members of the Ukrainian Academy of Sciences.

== Legacy ==
The Institute of Law of the National University Ostroh Academy carries the name of Ioaniky Malinovsky.

== Printed works ==
Malinovsky's research focused on the history of criminal law in the Grand Duchy of Lithuania, the history of Siberia, and on Soviet criminal and penitentiary law. Among his works are:

- The Doctrine of Crime under the Lithuanian Statute (Kiev, 1894);
- Exile to Siberia. Public Lectures (Tomsk, 1900);
- Blood Feud and Capital Punishment (Tomsk, 1909);
- The Council of the Great Duchy of Lithuania in Comparison with the Boyar Duma of Old Rus' (Tomsk, 1904–1912);
- Soviet Correctional-labour Institutions in Comparison with Bourgeois Prisons (Kiev, 1928);
- On the Study of Criminality and Criminals (Kiev, 1928).
