= Porfiry Krylov =

Russian botanist

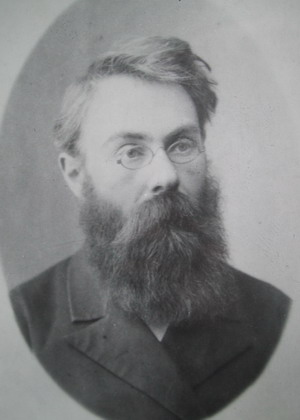
Porfiry Nikitich Krylov

Porfiry Krylov (Порфирий Никитич Крылов, 13 August 1850, village of Sagaiskoe (Сагайское), Minusinsk Hollow [now part of Krasnoyarsk Krai] – 27 December 1931, Tomsk) was a Russian botanist, known for his plant collecting expeditions.

== Biography ==
Porfiry Krylov was born into a family of Old Believers. His father was Nikita Kondratyevich Krylov (Никита Кондратьевич Крылов, 1792–1873), Perm merchant of the first guild, hereditary honorary citizen, and commerce advisor. In early childhood, Porfiry Krylov with his family moved to Perm, where at the age of 12 he began secondary school at Perm's gymnasium. After the fourth year, during the fifth year of secondary school, he was expelled from the gymnasium due to failure to appear for an exam and received a certificate of completion of four classes of the gymnasium with grades: “good” and “sufficient”, including “excellent” in Latin and “mediocre” in German. In 1868 he became an apprentice in one of the Perm pharmacies. He was interested in chemistry, medicinal plants, and botany.

In 1871 Krylov moved to Kazan, where in 1873 he entered a two-year course at the Imperial Kazan University to receive the title of pharmacist. After graduating with honors, he joined the Society of Naturalists of the Imperial Kazan University and worked with the society's herbarium cabinets. In the proceedings of the Society of Naturalists of the Imperial Kazan University, he published, at the age of 23, his first scientific work — which consisted of notes on a raspberry species in the genus Rubus. He became an adjunct laboratory assistant in the department of analytical chemistry at the Imperial Kazan University and soon moved to that university's botanical garden with an academic appointment as a botanist and scientific gardener. During this time he traveled eleven times to the Perm Governorate and the Ural Mountains and published 15 works on the local flora (including medicinal plants).

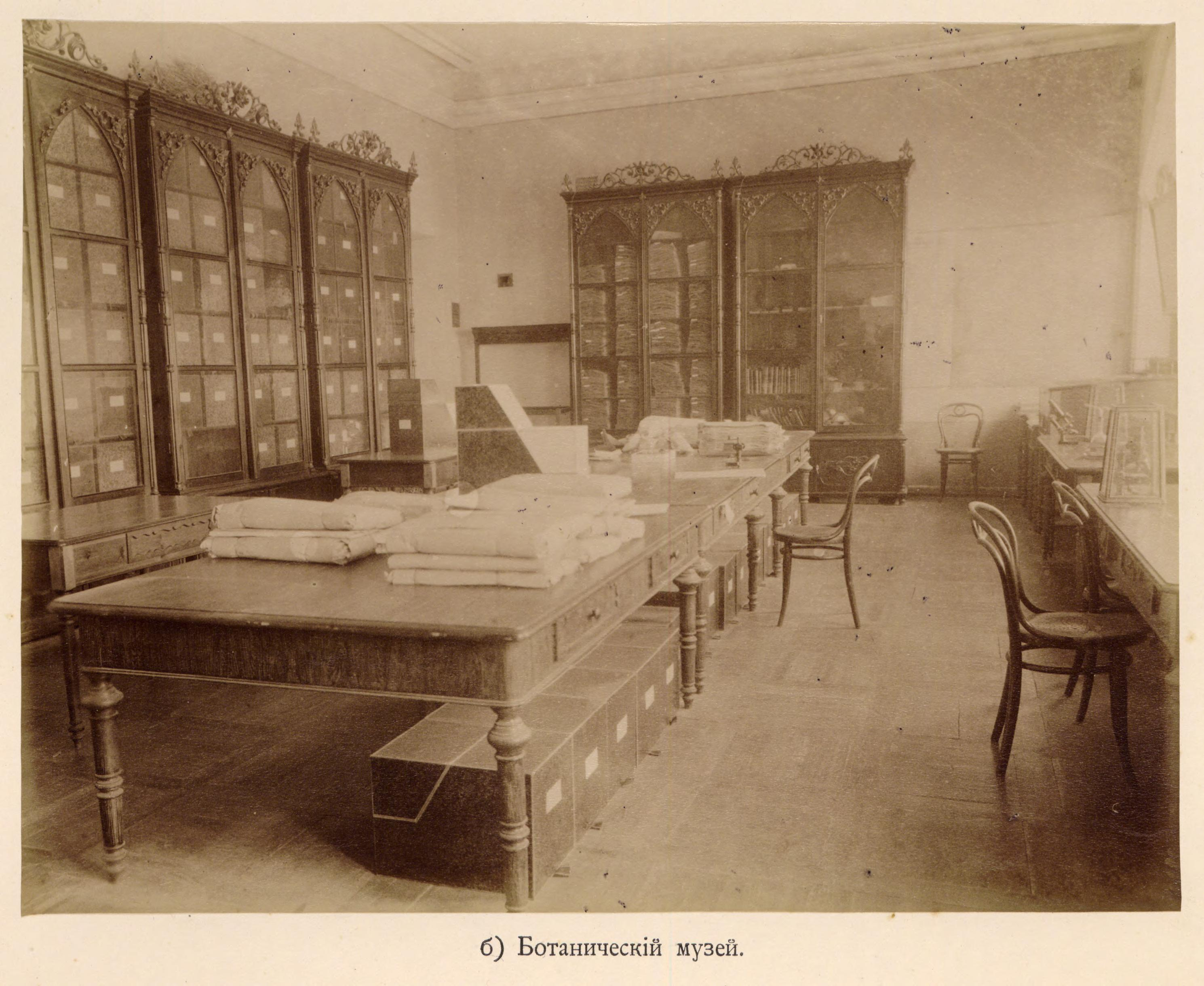
Herbarium (Botanical Museum), Tomsk 1890.

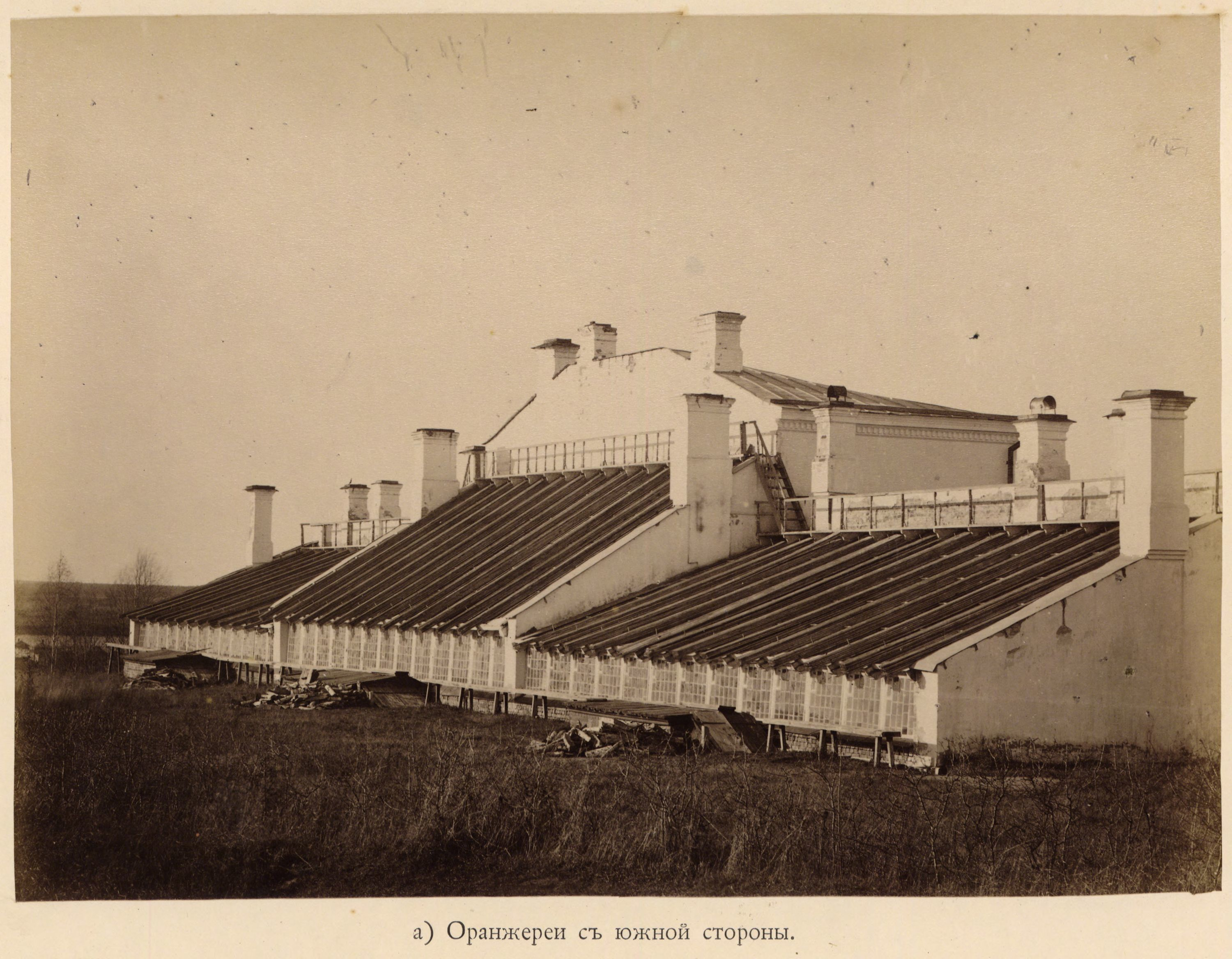
Orangery (south side), Tomsk 1890.

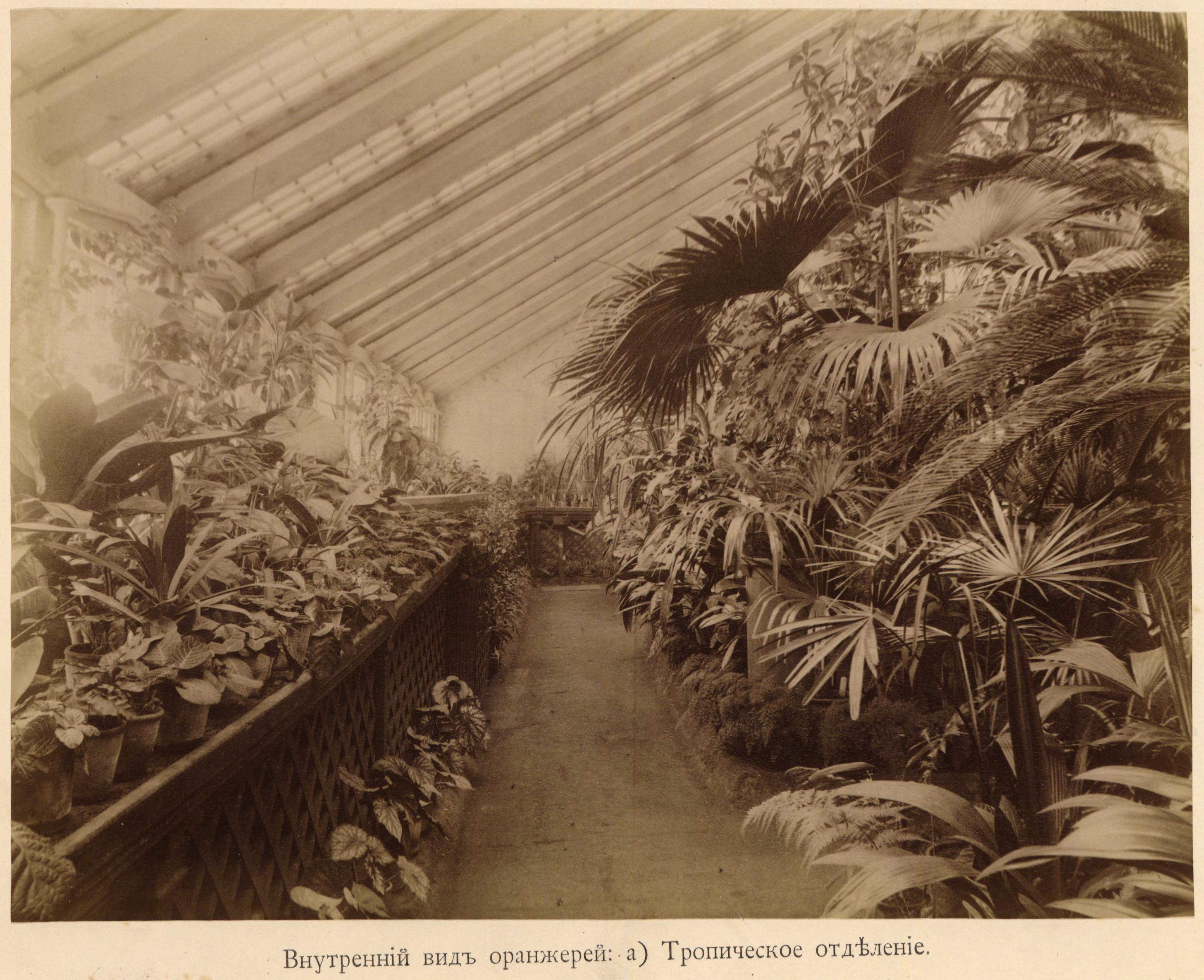
Interior view of the tropical department of the orangery, Tomsk 1890.

The trustee of the Western Siberia educational district and founder of Tomsk State University, Vasily Markovich Florinsky (Васи́лий Ма́ркович Флори́нский, 1834–1899) invited Krylov to create for Tomsk State University a botanical garden (the first beyond the Urals), as well as a herbarium. In July 1885, Krylov came to Tomsk and brought with him 700 pots of orangery plants for the botanical garden. He immediately began organizing the herbarium in the form of a botanical museum. Construction of the main orangery soon began and 14 greenhouses were prepared. A herb garden with 200 species, an arboretum, a medicinal plant garden and an orchard were created. He created a park in front of the main university building, the so-called university grove (университетская роща).

In 1888 Krylov founded the city park (Городской сад) in Tomsk. From the 1890s onwards, in order to complete the botanical garden, he made several trips to the Altai Mountains, to Lake Teletskoye, to Western Sayan, to Western Siberia (including Baraba Steppe, Kulunda Steppe ), and to Kazakhstan. He was the founder of tree nurseries in order to plant trees in Tomsk, Sudzhenka and Isilkul to protect the Trans-Siberian Railway against snow drifts. In 1901 Krylov published the first volume of his major work on the flora of Altai and the Tomsk Governorate. In 1914 the Imperial Academy of Sciences appointed him to the Botanical Museum of the Academy of Sciences in Petrograd. In 1915 the Permian entrepreneur Nikolai Vasilievich Meshkov (Николай Васильевич Мешков) and the botanist Pavel Vasilievich Syuzev (Павел Васильевич Сюзев) prepared reports for the creation in Perm of a public garden — but this project remained unrealized as a result of the October Revolution and the Russian Civil War. In 1916 Krylov traveled to the Caucasus. After the February Revolution and the October Revolution, he returned in 1917 to Tomsk, where he was appointed Professor at Tomsk University. His students included Viktor Vladimirovich Reverdatto (Виктор Владимирович Ревердатто), Lidia Palladievna Sergievskaya (Лидия Палладиевна Сергиевская), and Boris Konstantinovich Schischkin.

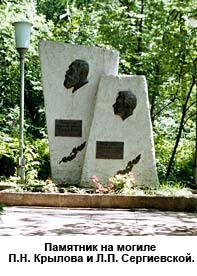
Krylov and Sergievskaya's grave monument in the Tomsk University Grove

In 1918 Krylov began his second major work on Western Siberian flora — the work was completed by his students after his death. In 1925 he was elected a corresponding member of the All-Ukrainian Academy of Sciences and in 1929 a corresponding member of the Academy of Sciences of the USSR. On the basis of his work, the geobotanical maps of the Krasnoyarsk Region were created in the 1930s. In 1931, Krylov was an advisor to an expedition conducted by the Novosibirsk branch of the Institute of Chemistry and Pharmacy to study in Transbaikalia medicinal plants and plants with valuable essential oils. To do this, he undertook a trip with his assistant L. P. Sergiyevskaya to the Aga Steppe — this was Krylov's last botanical trip. Uncontrollably galloping horses pulling the carriage in which Krylov and Sergiyevskaya were traveling caused a severe accident. The carriage overturned, and both scientists were badly injured and had to return to Tomsk. Krylov's health worsened and he died in December 1931. During his career, he organized 36 botanical expeditions, 24 of then made within Russian territory. Krylov scientifically described 12 new species and many taxa within species.

== Awards and honors ==
- honorary doctorate from the University of Kazan (1909)
- Baer Prize of the Russian Academy of Sciences (1914)
