= Tomsk State University =

Public research university in Siberia

National Research Tomsk State University (TSU)
- Национа́льный иссле́довательский То́мский госуда́рственный университе́т (ТГУ)
- Former names: The Siberian Imperial University (1878–1888); Tomsk University (1888–1934); Tomsk State University named after Valerian Vladimirovich Kuibyshev (1934–1991); Tomsk State University (1991–2010)
- Motto: Mens Mundo Aperiens
- Type: Public
- Established: 1878
- Endowment: ₽ 33 million (2018)
- President: Dr. Georgiy V. Mayer
- Rector: Dr. Eduard V. Galazhinsky
- Students: 23,000
- Location: 36 Lenin Ave., Tomsk, Tomsk Oblast, 634050, Russia
- Campus: Urban
- Language: Russian, English
- Newspaper: Alma Mater
- Website: en.tsu.ru

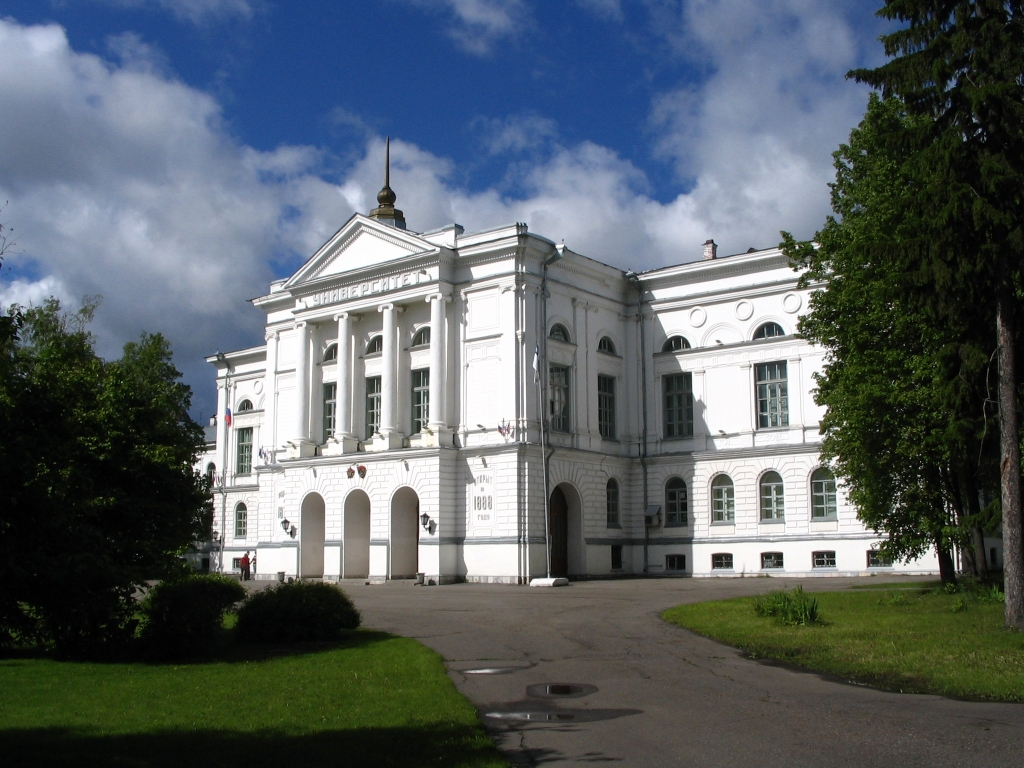

- Location within Tomsk Oblast

General information
- Location: Tomsk, Russia
- Coordinates: 56°28′10″N 84°56′51″E

The National Research Tomsk State University, TSU (Russian: Национа́льный иссле́довательский То́мский госуда́рственный университе́т) is a public research university located in Tomsk, Russia. The university, which opened in 1888, was the first university in the Asian part of Russia and, in practice, the first Russian university East of the Volga.

TSU comprises 22 faculties and institutes with 152 departments, serving approximately 18,000 students. As of 2025, the university ranked #499 in the QS World University Rankings and #501 in the World University Rankings by Times Higher Education.

== History ==
=== Imperial University ===
On May 16 (28 N.S.), 1878, Emperor Alexander II signed a decree on the establishment of the first higher education institution between the Russian Urals and the Pacific Ocean. The move was supported by major industrialist and businessmen, who contributed with private funds, as well as by local city councils in Siberia, but was opposed by conservative voices within the State Council, notably Konstantin Pobedonostsev, who complained about the cost of the project and the fact that local Tomsk society consisted of "all sorts of rabble". Nevertheless, the project progressed, albeit slowly, and on September 1, 1888 the first faculty (medicine) of the Siberian Imperial University named after His Imperial Majesty Alexander III (Russian: Первый Сибирский Томский Императорский (имени Его Императорского Величества Александра III)) finally opened. Classes to the first 72 students were handled by eight professors, aided by seven assistants and laboratory technicians. Professor Nikolai Gezekhus was appointed the first rector of the University. It would take a decade for the second faculty of the university (Law) to become operational.

=== Recent history ===
Tomsk State University contracted T-Platforms to create a high-performance computing cluster. On February 16, 2007, the university announced the completion of a new supercomputer, "SKIF Cyberia". In the June 2007 TOP500 listing, the system ranked as the most powerful supercomputer in the former Soviet Union and #105 globally.

In 2013, the "Council on Competitiveness Enhancement of Leading Russian Universities" selected Tomsk State University for Project 5-100, a program started by the Russian Ministry of Education and Science to accelerate the development of Russian higher education, with the public goal of achieving top 100 university status for at least five of the selected participants.

In March 2022, Eduard Vladimirovich Galazhinsky, Rector of the university, was suspended by the European University Association (EUA) following support for the 2022 Russian invasion of Ukraine by the Russian Union of Rectors (RUR), for being "diametrically opposed to the European values that they committed to when joining EUA”. Professor Terry Callaghan, who had helped establish 21 Russian environmental research stations in the Arctic, paused his professorship at Tomsk State University after the rectors’ statement.

== Faculties ==
Faculty of	Founded in
Mechanics and Mathematics	1948
Physics	1948
Radiophysics	1953
Physics and Engineering	1963
Biological Institute	1932
Geology and Geography	1933
Chemistry	1932
History	1917
Philology	1917
Philosophy	1987
Journalism	2004
Foreign Languages	1995
Psychology	1997
Physical Education	2005
Innovative Technologies	2009
Institute of Law	1897
Institute of Economics and Management	2016
Institute of Arts and Culture	1994
Military Education	1926
Pre-courses Department	2015
Institute of Applied Mathematics and Computer Science	2017
Higher IT School	2017

== Reputation ==
University rankings

Global – Overall
- QS World: =499 (2026)
- RUR World: 240 (2018)

Regional – Overall
- QS BRICS: 19
- QS Emerging Europe and Central Asia: 9 (2022)
- THE Emerging Economies: 70

National – Overall
- Ria Novosti National: 3 (2017)

In 2022, the university was ranked #272 by QS World University Rankings, #601 by World University Rankings by Times Higher Education, and #901 by Academic Ranking of World Universities by Shanghai Jiao Tong University. As of 2017, National Research Tomsk State University was the overall third best classical university in Russia according to RIA Novosti—outperformed only by Moscow State University and Ural Federal University.

== Academics ==
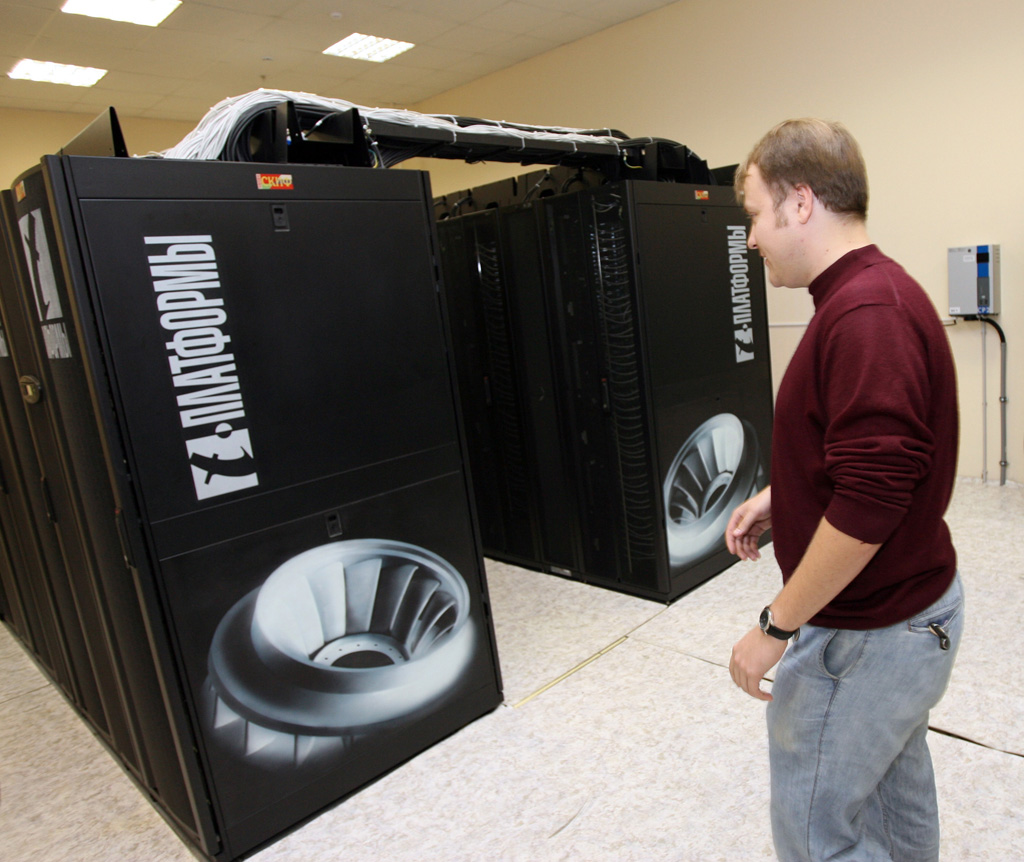
SKIF Cyberia supercomputer

The Research Library and Tomsk State University were opened in the same year, 1888. The founder of the library was Vasily Florinskiy – physician and writer, organizer of Tomsk University.

== International collaboration ==
The university is a member of the University of the Arctic. UArctic is an international cooperative network based in the Circumpolar Arctic region, consisting of more than 200 universities, colleges, and other organizations with an interest in promoting education and research in the Arctic region. The collaboration has been paused after the beginning of the Russo-Ukrainian War in 2022.

== Notable people ==
- Vladimir Boldyrev - Chemist
- Alexei Didenko – Graduate of Tomsk University law faculty (2005), deputy of Tomsk Oblast duma, and regional coordinator of the Liberal Democratic Party of Russia.
- Alexandre Dogiel - Histologist, neuroscientist
- Nikolay Aleksandrovich Gezehus – First rector of Tomsk University (1888–89), professor and founder of physics research at the university.
- Nikolay Feofanovich Kaschenko – Professor and founder of the school of vertebrate zoology at Tomsk University, member of Ukrainian SSR Academy of Sciences, rector of Tomsk University (1893–95), and professor of the Kiev Polytechnic Institute.
- Aleksey Aleksandrovich Kulyabko – Graduated as a doctor of medicine from Tomsk University in 1893, professor at Tomsk University from 1903–24, founder of the School of Physiology.
- Pyotr Lyashchenko - Economist, served as rector of the university.
- Ioaniky Malinovsky - Jurist and historian of law, opponent of the death penalty, taught at Tomsk University 1898-1911
- Fritz Noether - German mathematician and former professor; executed by the Stalinist NKVD.
- Antonina Polozhy – Graduated Tomsk in 1939, became a professor at the university in the botanical field.
- Sergey Psakhie – Graduate and former professor of Tomsk University, Chairman of the Presidium of the Tomsk Scientific Centre of the Siberian Division of the Russian Academy of Sciences.
- Mikhail Reisner - Lawyer, jurist, historian of law.
- Grigory Shajn - Graduate and astronomer.
- Mikhail Usanovich - Professor and physical chemist, known for his generalized acid-base theory.
- Gina Gerson - Pornographic actress.

=== Nobel laureates ===
- Ivan Petrovich Pavlov - Professor and head of pharmacology for a brief period in 1890. Later, became the first Russian Nobel laureate upon winning the Nobel Prize for Physiology or Medicine in 1904.
- Nikolay Nikolayevich Semyonov - Junior assistant in the physics faculty. In 1956, was awarded the Nobel Prize in Chemistry.
