= Hermann Lux =

German inorganic chemist (1904–1999)

Hermann Lux (3 September 1904, in Karlsruhe – 8 July 1999), was a prominent inorganic chemist from Munich, Germany.

Lux studied chemistry in the University of Karlsruhe where he graduated with honors in 1928 and then completed his education in the University of Bonn in 1929. He returned to Karlsruhe and worked there until his move to the Ludwig-Maximilians-Universität München in 1937, where he worked as an assistant until 1940, then as a lecturer until 1946 and then became the head of the analytical chemistry department. He became an associate professor in 1944 and a full professor in 1955. He moved to the Technical University of Munich in 1968 where he was a full professor of inorganic and analytical chemistry until his retirement in 1973. He died on 8 July 1999, almost 95 years old.

== Achievements ==
- Discovered a method of quantitative determination of 1 ppm quantities of mercury (1931, together with Alfred Stock)
- Extensively studied chemical reactions in molten salts, leading up to the Lux–Flood acid–base theory (1937)
- Invented the "hanging melt" method which made it possible to study extremely aggressive molten salt systems, such as alkali oxides.
- Investigated salts of metals in unusual oxidation states, such as bivalent chromium or pentavalent manganese.
- Published a number of books including "Anorganisch-chemische Experimentierkunst" (Inorganic-chemical experimental art) and "Praktikum der quantitativen anorganischen Analyse" (Practical course of the quantitative inorganic analysis) which were translated into many languages and used by many analytic chemists.
