= Russell S. Drago =

American inorganic chemist

- Born: November 5, 1928; Montague, Massachusetts, United States
- Died: December 5, 1997 (aged 69); Flagler Beach, Florida
- Education: Ohio State University; University of Massachusetts Amherst
- Spouse: Ruth Ann Burrill
- Awards: ACS Award in Inorganic Chemistry (1969), Guggenheim Fellowship for Chemistry (1973)
- Scientific career
- Fields: Inorganic Chemistry
- Workplaces: University of Illinois at Urbana–Champaign; University of Florida
- Doctoral advisor: Harry H. Sisler

Russell Stephen Drago (November 5, 1928 – December 5, 1997) was an American professor of inorganic chemistry. He mentored more than 130 PhD students, authored over a dozen textbooks and four hundred research documents, which have been published in several languages. He filed 17 process patents.

== Personal life ==
Russell S. Drago was born November 5, 1928, in Montague, Massachusetts to Stephen R. Drago and Lillia Mary Margret (Pucci) Drago.

In 1950, Drago married Ruth Ann Burrill (January 29, 1929 – November 9, 2013). They remained married for 47 years until his death. They had four children, Patti Kouba (Drago), Steve, Paul, and Robert.

== Career ==
In June, 1950, Drago graduated with a BS degree in chemistry from the University of Massachusetts Amherst. After he completed his time with the U.S. Air Force, he enrolled at Ohio State University under the GI bill, completing his Ph.D. degree on December 17, 1954, under Professor Harry Sisler. His thesis was entitled "Studies on the Synthesis of Chloramine and Hydrazine." Subsequently he was a member of the chemistry faculty at the University of Illinois at Urbana–Champaign, where he remained until 1982. In 1966, he published the textbook Physical Methods in Inorganic Chemistry. In 1982, he moved to the University of Florida.

== Contributions ==
Drago's initial independent research continued his PhD work. Subsequently he expanded the scope to covered both the theoretical and practical side of acid-base chemistry. He developed the E and C equation as a quantitative model for acid-base reactions. His group used a variety of physical methods to probe intermolecular interactions. He conducted NMR studies of paramagnetic complexes. He contributed to the area of catalysis focusing primarily on chemical processes relevant to industrial applications. Work in this field contributed significantly to the understanding of ligand – metal and metal – metal interactions and their influence on the mechanisms, activity, and selectivity of numerous transition metals catalyzed systems.

A video interview with Drago is available.

== Recognition ==
- 1969: ACS Award in Inorganic Chemistry
- 1973: Guggenheim Fellowship for Chemistry
