= Chloro(pyridine)cobaloxime =

Chloro(pyridine)cobaloxime(III)
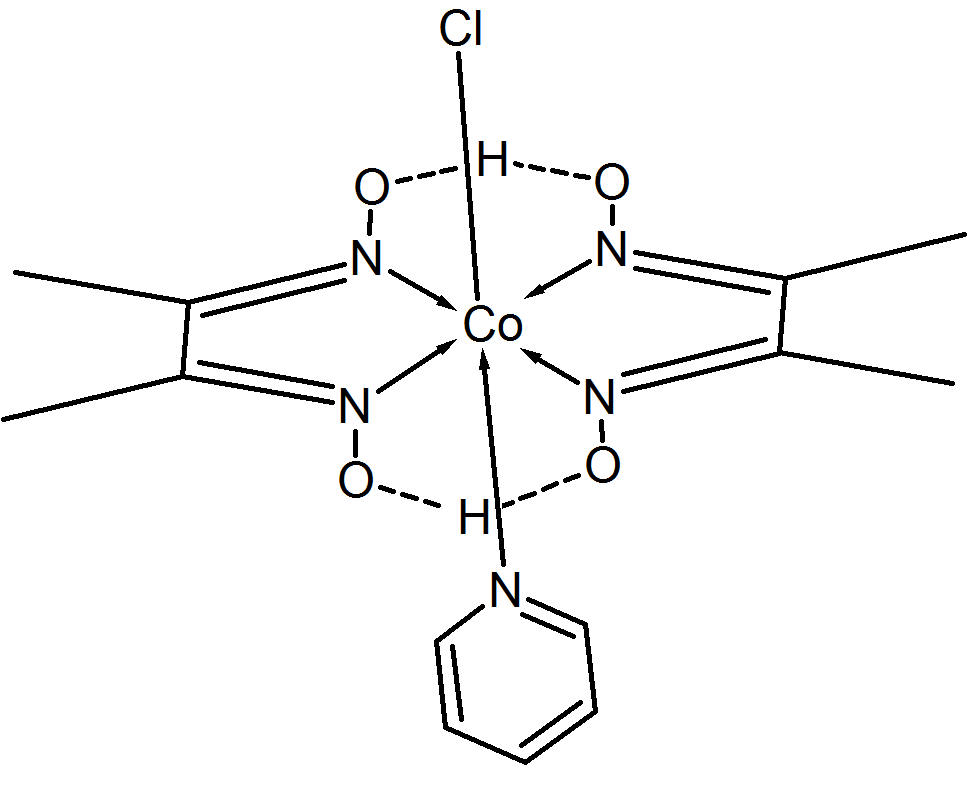

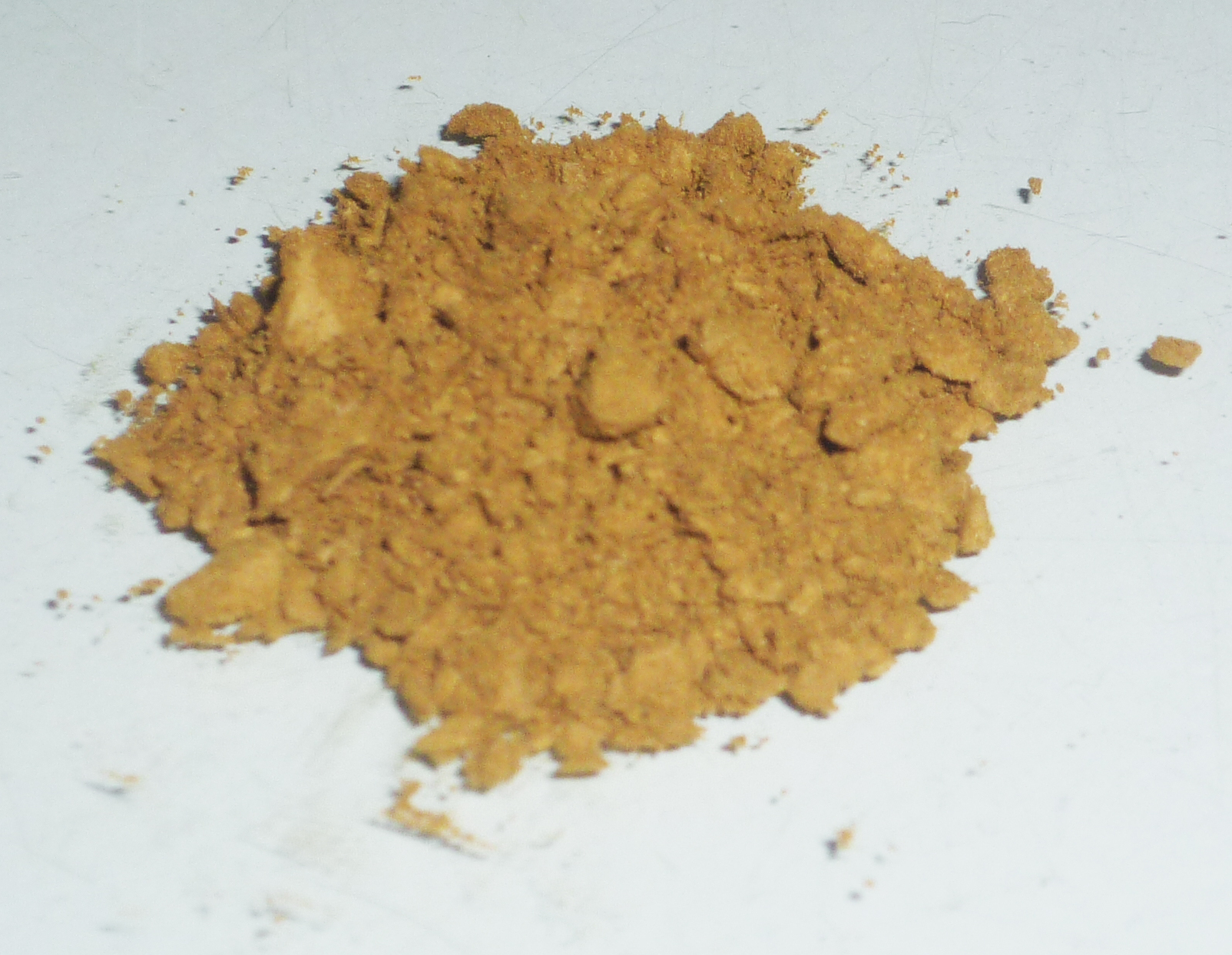

Names
- Other names Chloro(pyridine)bis(dimethylglyoximato)cobalt(III), Chloro(N,N'-dihydroxy-2,3-butanediimine-κ2N,N')(N-hydroxy-2,3-butanediiminato-κ2N,N')(methanol)cobalt - pyridine (1:1)

Identifiers
CAS Number	23295-32-1
3D model (JSmol)	Interactive image
ChemSpider	28296302
ECHA InfoCard	100.153.977
EC Number	625-485-1
PubChem CID	154824519
- InChI: InChI=1S/2C2H6N2.2ClH.Co/c2*3-1-2-4;;;/h2*3-4H,1-2H2;2*1H;/q2*-2;;;+2/p-2 Key: CZHYJYFFRNANOP-DSUIRYESSA-M; InChI=1S/C9H17N4O4.C5H5N.ClH.Co/c1-6(10)7(2)11-16-19-17-13-9(4)8(3)12-15-18-14-5;1-2-4-6-5-3-1;;/h1-5H3;1-5H;1H;/q-1;;; 2/p-1/b11-7 ,12-8 ,13-9 ;;;
- SMILES: CO[H]O\N1=C(/C)\C(\C)=N2\O[H]O\N3=C(/C)\C(\C)=N/[Co]123Cl.c1ccccn1

Properties
Chemical formula	C_{13}H_{19}ClCoN_{5}O_{4}
Molar mass	403.71 g·mol^{−1}
Appearance	yellow-brown solid
Solubility in water	insoluble

Hazards
- GHS labelling
Pictograms	(GHS07: Exclamation mark)
Signal word	Warning
Hazard statements	H315, H319, H335
- Except where otherwise noted, data are given for materials in their standard state (at 25 °C [77 °F], 100 kPa). verify (what is ?) Infobox references

Chloro(pyridine)cobaloxime is a coordination compound containing a Co^{III} center with octahedral coordination. It has been considered as a model compound of vitamin B_{12} for studying the properties and mechanism of action of the vitamin. It belongs to a class of bis(dimethylglyoximato)cobalt(III) complexes with different axial ligands, called cobaloximes. Chloro(pyridine)cobaloxime is a yellow-brown powder that is sparingly soluble in most solvents, including water.

== Structure ==
The complex adopts a distorted octahedral geometry. Cobalt(III) is bound to two dimethylglyoximate ligands, i.e., mono-deprotonated dimethylglyoxime, in the equatorial plane. Completing the coordination sphere are chloride and a pyridine at the axial positions.

== Preparation ==
The compound is usually prepared by mixing cobalt(II) chloride, dimethylglyoxime and pyridine in an ethanolic solution. This process afford the cobaloxime(II), which is subsequently oxidized by the oxygen in air:

4 CoCl_{2}•6H_{2}O + 8 dmgH_{2} + 8 py + O_{2} → 4 ClCo(dmgH)_{2}py + 4 py•HCl + 14 H_{2}O

Using cobalt(II) acetate in place of cobalt(II) chloride produce aceto(pyridine)cobaloxime. This acetate can be converted to the respective bromide, iodide, cyanate, cyanide, azide and thiocyanate.

(CH_{3}COO)Co(DH)_{2}py + NaX → XCo(DH)_{2}py + NaCH_{3}COO (X = Br, I, CNO, CN, N_{3} or SCN)

== Reactions ==
The cobaloxime is slowly decomposed by acids and bases. With acids, the products of decomposition are dimethylglyoxime, cobalt salts, and pyridine; with bases, derivatives of other cobaloximes are formed, usually with the release of chloride ions.

The complex has no reaction with hydrogen gas, and cannot carry oxygen as salcomine does. It would, however, react with hydrogen in the presence of sodium hydroxide, a catalytic amount of platinum metal, or a reduced cobaloxime, therefore once the reduction occurs, the hydrogenation would occur much more rapidly as there is autocatalysis.

The reduction products of cobaloxime depends on the conditions. At pH near 7, a cobaloxime with a Co^{II} center is formed. With a higher pH, the cobalt center would be further reduced to the Co^{I} state, which is supernucleophilic.

The pyridine base in the axial position can also be replaced by other organic bases containing a sp^{2} hybridized N atom as well. Commonly used bases are morpholine, 4-methylpyridine, imidazole and benzimidazole. The derivatives are again prepared via diacetocobaloxime, followed by the addition of the desired base, such as imidazole.

(CH_{3}COO)_{2}Co(DH)_{2} + imi → (CH_{3}COO)Co(DH)_{2}imi

=== Alkylation of Co ===
One of the methods used for producing the Co-C bond is to make use of the supernucleophilicity of the Co^{I} center. Chloro(pyridine)cobaloxime(III) is first reduced to Chloro(pyridine)cobaloxime(I) by sodium borohydride in alkaline solution, then an alkyl halide is added into the reaction mixture, and the desired Co-C bond is formed via a S_{N}2 reaction. This method can be used to produce cobaloximes containing a primary or a secondary alkyl substituent.

For derivatives with phenyl or vinyl substituent, the Grignard reaction is employed. However, since the dimethylglyoxime ligands contains two acidic H atoms in the oxime group, the Grignard reagent must be used in three-fold excess to compensate the loss.
