= Diethyl sulfide =

- diethyl sulfide

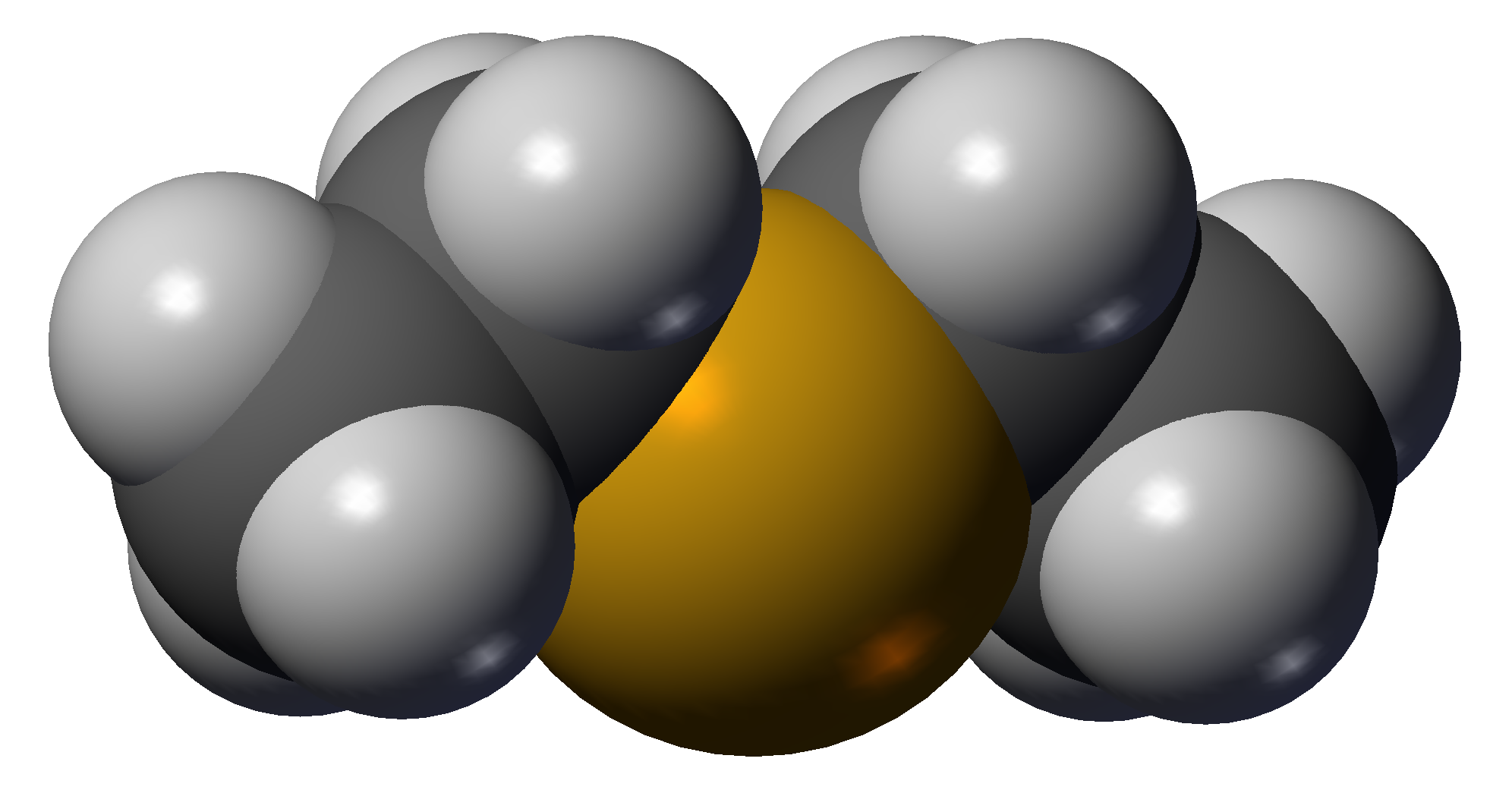
- diethyl sulfide 3D

Names
- Preferred IUPAC name (Ethylsulfanyl)ethane
- Other names: 1,1-Thiobisethane; Diethyl thioether; Ethyl sulfide; Thioethyl ether

Identifiers
CAS Number	352-93-2
3D model (JSmol)	Interactive image
Beilstein Reference	1696909
ChEBI	CHEBI:27710
ChEMBL	ChEMBL117181
ChemSpider	9233
ECHA InfoCard	100.005.934
EC Number	206-526-9
Gmelin Reference	1915
KEGG	C14706
PubChem CID	9609
RTECS number	LC7200000
UNII	9191Y76OTC
CompTox Dashboard (EPA)	DTXSID5027146
- InChI: InChI=1S/C4H10S/c1-3-5-4-2/h3-4H2,1-2H3 Key: LJSQFQKUNVCTIA-UHFFFAOYSA-N; InChI=1/C4H10O4S/c1-3-7-9(5,6)8-4-2/h3-4H2,1-2H3 Key: DENRZWYUOJLTMF-UHFFFAOYAR; InChI=1/C4H10S/c1-3-5-4-2/h3-4H2,1-2H3 Key: LJSQFQKUNVCTIA-UHFFFAOYAZ
- SMILES: S(CC)CC

Properties
Chemical formula	(CH_{3}CH_{2})_{2}S
Molar mass	90.18 g·mol^{−1}
Appearance	Colorless liquid
Odor	Unpleasant
Density	0.837 g/cm^{3}
Melting point	−103.8 °C (−154.8 °F; 169.3 K)
Boiling point	92 °C (198 °F; 365 K)
Solubility in water	insoluble
Solubility in ethanol	miscible
Solubility in diethyl ether	miscible
Magnetic susceptibility (χ)	−67.9·10^{−6} cm^{3}/mol
Refractive index (n_{D})	1.44233

Hazards
- Occupational safety and health (OHS/OSH)
Main hazards	Skin and eye irritant. Highly flammable liquid and vapor
- GHS labelling
Pictograms	(GHS02: Flammable) (GHS07: Exclamation mark)
Signal word	Danger
Hazard statements	H225, H315, H319
Precautionary statements	P210, P233, P264, P280, P303+P361+P353, P370+P378
NFPA 704 (fire diamond)	2 3 1
Flash point	−10 °C (14 °F; 263 K)
Safety data sheet (SDS)	External MSDS

Related compounds
Related thioethers	Dimethyl sulfide; Diphenyl sulfide
- Except where otherwise noted, data are given for materials in their standard state (at 25 °C [77 °F], 100 kPa). verify (what is ?) Infobox references

Diethyl sulfide (British English: diethyl sulphide) is an organosulfur compound with the chemical formula (CH_{3}CH_{2})_{2}S. It is a colorless, malodorous liquid. Although a common thioether, it has few applications.

== Preparation ==
Diethyl sulfide is a by-product of the commercial production of ethanethiol, which is prepared by the reaction of ethylene with hydrogen sulfide over an alumina-based catalyst. The amount of diethyl sulfide produced can be controlled by varying the ratio of hydrogen sulfide to ethylene.

== Occurrence ==
Diethyl sulfide has been found to be a constituent of the odor of durian fruit and as a constituent found in volatiles from potatoes.

== Reactions ==
Diethyl sulfide is a Lewis base, classified as a soft ligand (see also ECW model). Its relative donor strength toward a series of acids, versus other Lewis bases, can be illustrated by C-B plots.

With bromine, it forms a salt called diethylbromosulfonium bromide:

(CH_{3}CH_{2})_{2}S + Br_{2} → [(CH_{3}CH_{2})_{2}SBr]^{+}Br^{−}

A typical coordination complex is cis-PtCl_{2}(S(CH_{2}CH_{3})_{2})_{2}, one of many transition metal thioether complexes.

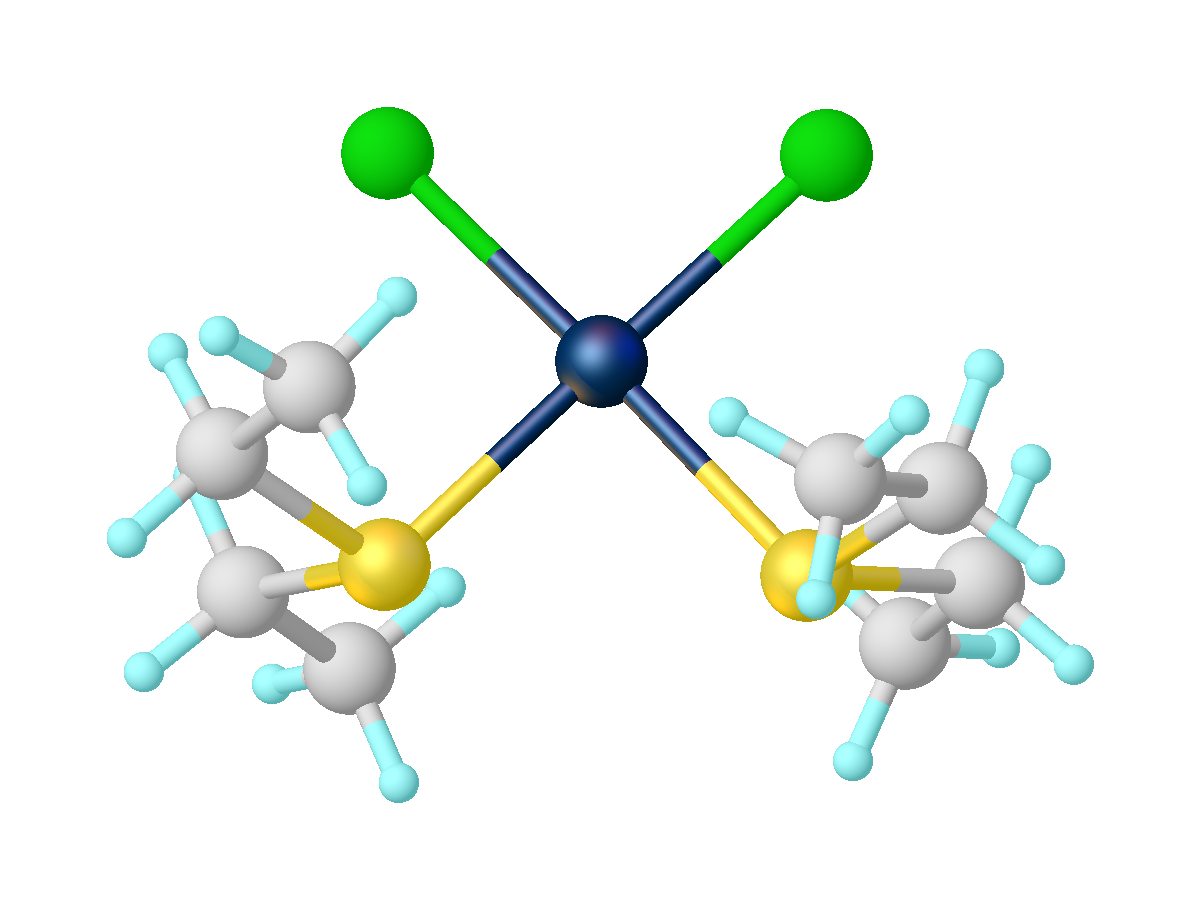
Structure of cis-PtCl_{2}(SEt_{2})_{2}.
