= C2Cl3F3 =

The molecular formula C_{2}Cl_{3}F_{3} (molar mass: 187.38 g/mol, exact mass: 185.9018 u) may refer to:

- 1,1,1-Trichloro-2,2,2-trifluoroethane
- 1,1,2-Trichloro-1,2,2-trifluoroethane, or CFC-113
