= C2Cl2F4 =

The molecular formula C_{2}Cl_{2}F_{4} (molar mass: 170.92 g/mol) may refer to:

- 1,1-Dichlorotetrafluoroethane
- 1,2-Dichlorotetrafluoroethane
