= R114 =

R114 may refer to:

- 1,2-Dichlorotetrafluoroethane (R-114, a CFC gas)
- R114 road (disambiguation)
