= 1-Chloro-1,2,2,2-tetrafluoroethane =

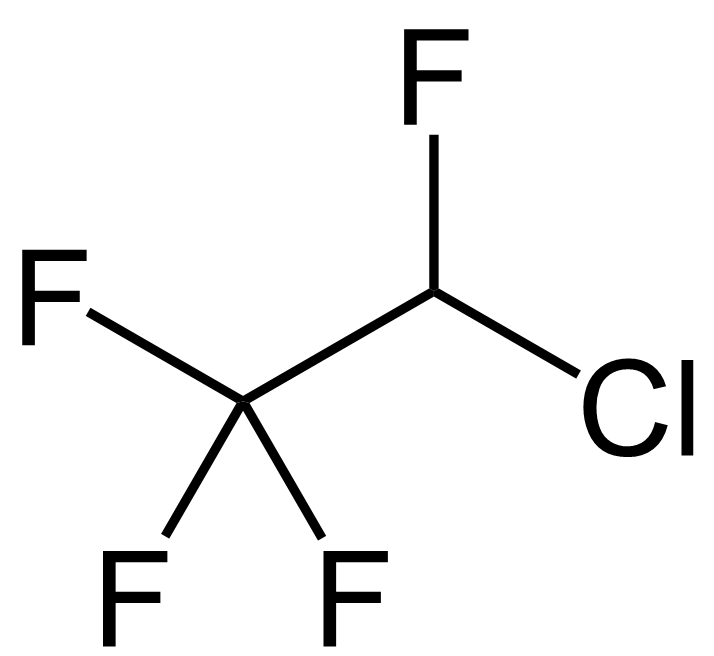

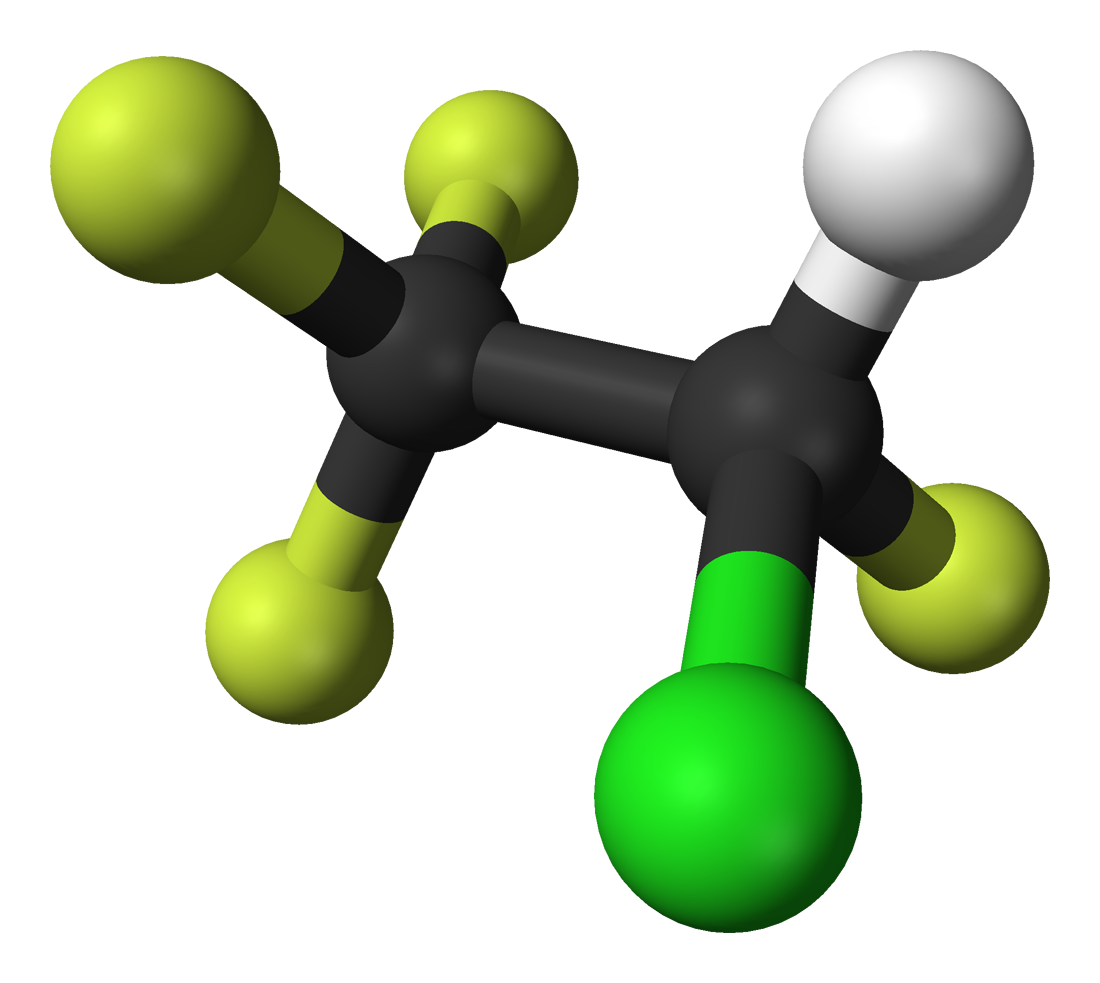
Ball-and-stick model of 2-chloro-1,1,1,2-tetrafluoroethane

Names
- Preferred IUPAC name 2-Chloro-1,1,1,2-tetrafluoroethane
- Other names HCFC-124; FE-241 fire extinguishant Suva 124 refrigerant

Identifiers
CAS Number	2837-89-0
3D model (JSmol)	Interactive image
ChemSpider	16841
ECHA InfoCard	100.018.754
EC Number	220-629-6
PubChem CID	17822
UNII	N00845EG42
UN number	1021
CompTox Dashboard (EPA)	DTXSID7029245
- InChI: InChI=1S/C2HClF4/c3-1(4)2(5,6)7/h1H Key: BOUGCJDAQLKBQH-UHFFFAOYSA-N; InChI=1/C2HClF4/c3-1(4)2(5,6)7/h1H Key: BOUGCJDAQLKBQH-UHFFFAOYAT
- SMILES: FC(F)(F)C(Cl)F

Properties
Chemical formula	C_{2}HClF_{4}
Molar mass	136.475953
Boiling point	−11.963 °C; 10.467 °F; 261.187 K
- Except where otherwise noted, data are given for materials in their standard state (at 25 °C [77 °F], 100 kPa). verify (what is ?) Infobox references

1-Chloro-1,2,2,2-tetrafluoroethane, C_{2}HClF_{4}, is a hydrochlorofluorocarbon used as a component in refrigerants offered as replacements for chlorofluorocarbons. HCFC-124 is also used in gaseous fire suppression systems as a replacement for bromochlorocarbons.
