= Trichlorotrifluoroethane =

Trichlorotrifluoroethane may refer to:

- 1,1,1-Trichloro-2,2,2-trifluoroethane
- 1,1,2-Trichloro-1,2,2-trifluoroethane
