= 1,3-Dichloro-1,1,2,2,3-pentafluoropropane =

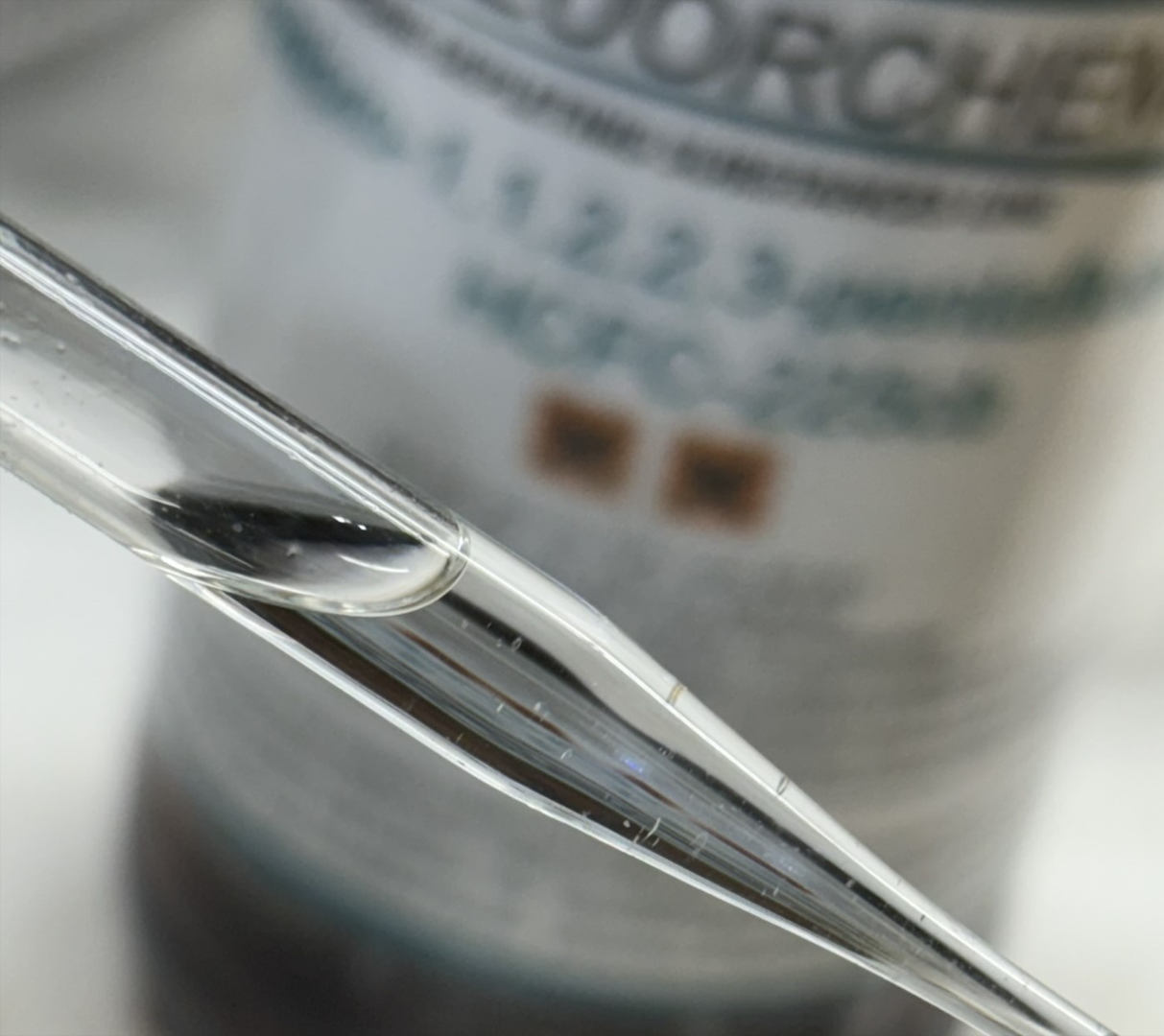

Names
- Preferred IUPAC name 1,3-Dichloro-1,1,2,2,3-pentafluoropropane
- Other names Freon-225cb, AK--225, HCFC-225cb, Refrigerant 225cb, R-225cb

Identifiers
CAS Number	507-55-1
3D model (JSmol)	Interactive image
Beilstein Reference	1748901
ChemSpider	56144
ECHA InfoCard	100.007.343
EC Number	208-076-9
PubChem CID	62353
UNII	G6975BUY8I
UN number	3082
CompTox Dashboard (EPA)	DTXSID6042028
- InChI: InChI=1S/C3HCl2F5/c4-1(6)2(7,8)3(5,9)10/h1H Key: UJIGKESMIPTWJH-UHFFFAOYSA-N
- SMILES: C(C(C(F)(F)Cl)(F)F)(F)Cl

Properties
Chemical formula	C_{3}HCl_{2}F_{5}
Molar mass	202.93 g·mol^{−1}
Appearance	Clear, colorless
Odor	Odorless
Density	1.56 g/mL (Liquid)
Melting point	−97 °C (−143 °F; 176 K)
Boiling point	56 °C (133 °F; 329 K)
Vapor pressure	38.13kPa @ 25 °C
Thermal conductivity	0.057 W/m-K

Hazards
- GHS labelling
Pictograms	(GHS07: Exclamation mark)
Signal word	Warning
Hazard statements	H315, H319, H332
Precautionary statements	P261, P264, P264+P265, P271, P280, P302+P352, P304+P340, P305+P351+P338, P317, P321, P332+P317, P337+P317, P362+P364
- Except where otherwise noted, data are given for materials in their standard state (at 25 °C [77 °F], 100 kPa). verify (what is ?) Infobox references

1,3-Dichloro-1,1,2,2,3-pentafluoropropane (HCFC-225cb, chemical formula C_{3}HF_{5}Cl_{2}) is a hydrochlorofluorocarbon. It is a volatile derivative of propane which has served as an HCFC replacement for the CFC, 1,1,2-trichloro-1,2,2-trifluoroethane which was used as a cleaning agent which has been used in the aerospace and electronics industries since the phase out of class 1 ozone depleting substances by the Montreal Protocol. As of 2015 with the phase out of hydrochlorofluorocarbons, HCFC-225 is included in this phase out, and applications where it was used must now be fulfilled by non-ozone depleting substances.

== Atmospheric effects ==
The production of 1,3-dichloro-1,1,2,2,3-pentafluoropropane and use as a cleaning agent replacement for CFC-113 may result in its release to the environment through various waste streams. If released to air, a vapor pressure of 286 mm Hg at 25 °C indicates 1,3-dichloro-1,1,2,2,3-pentafluoropropane will exist solely as a vapor in the ambient atmosphere. When released in air, it is subject to degradation in the atmosphere by reaction with photochemically produced hydroxyl radicals; the half-life for this reaction in air is estimated to be 4.9 years. 1,3-dichloro-1,1,2,2,3-pentafluoropropane is a powerful greenhouse gas with a global warming potential 568 times stronger than CO_{2}. It is also an ozone depleter with an ozone depletion potential of 0.03 which is on the higher end for HCFCs with R-22 having a lower ozone depletion potential.

== Manufacturing ==
1,3-Dichloro-1,1,2,2,3-pentafluoropropane is manufactured in industry by the addition of Dichlorofluoromethane to Tetrafluoroethylene. In 2016, production in the United States accounted to 11,339 Kilograms. 1,3-Dichloro-1,1,2,2,3-pentafluoropropane is fairly inert under most normal conditions, however if heated to extreme temperatures it may react with metals. When reacted with strong bases, toxic gases can be released.

Manufacturing of HCFC-225cb has significantly declined beyond the year 2020 as a result of the Montreal Protocol. HCFC-225cb has historically been manufactured by multiple companies including Asahi Glass Company (AGC), and Fluorchem Corporation. Both AGC and Fluorchem have discontinued production of HCFC-225cb due to its ozone depleting properties.

== Role within the aerospace industry ==
1,3-Dichloro-1,1,2,2,3-pentafluoropropane, known in the aerospace industry as AK-225G, has been used by NASA and the United States Department of Defense to clean oxygen breathing systems. Prior to 1996, NASA and the DoD had selected CFC-113 (1,1,2-trichloro-1,2,2-trifluoroethane) as the solvent of choice because it was effective, less toxic, and compatible with most materials used within construction, and not reactive with oxygen. Since the enforcement of the Montreal Protocol in 1996 HCFC-225 was selected as an interim replacement for cleaning large scale propulsion oxygen systems at NASA.

Use as a cleaning solvent for parts often involves flushing, vapour degreasing, and hand wiping the components. Some components may be cleaned with water based cleaners, but these are then flushed and verified clean with HCFC-225. NASA has made efforts to recapture, distill, and re-use HCFC-225 where it is feasible. However, many users within the aerospace industry still rely on stockpiled CFC-113. In 2002, the DoD permitted DuPont Ikon P (perfluorobutyl iodide) solution for use where HCFC-225 is now banned, however, DuPont has since discontinued Ikon P and both the aerospace industry and Department of Defense are still readily searching for alternatives.

== See also ==
- F-Gases
