= Chlorofluorocarbon =

Class of organic compounds

Chlorofluorocarbons (CFCs) and hydrochlorofluorocarbons (HCFCs) are fully or partly halogenated hydrocarbons that contain carbon (C), hydrogen (H), chlorine (Cl), and fluorine (F). They are produced as volatile derivatives of methane, ethane, and propane.

The most common example of a CFC is dichlorodifluoromethane (R-12). R-12, also commonly called Freon, is used as a refrigerant. Many CFCs have been widely used as refrigerants, propellants (in aerosol applications), gaseous fire suppression systems, and solvents. As a result of CFCs contributing to ozone depletion in the upper atmosphere, the manufacture of such compounds has been phased out under the Montreal Protocol, and they are being replaced with other products such as hydrofluorocarbons (HFCs) and hydrofluoroolefins (HFOs) including R-410A, R-134a and R-1234yf.

== Structure, properties and production ==
As in simpler alkanes, carbons in CFCs bond with tetrahedral symmetry. Because the fluorine and chlorine atoms differ greatly in size and effective charge from hydrogen and from each other, methane-derived CFCs deviate from perfect tetrahedral symmetry.

The physical properties of CFCs and HCFCs can be affected by changes in the number and identity of the halogen atoms. They are generally volatile, but less so than their parent alkanes. The decreased volatility is attributed to the molecular polarity induced by the halides, which induces intermolecular interactions. Thus, methane boils at −161 °C whereas the fluoromethanes boil between −51.7 (CF_{2}H_{2}) and −128 °C (CF_{4}). CFCs still have higher boiling points because the chloride is even more polarizable than fluoride. Because of their polarity, CFCs are useful solvents, and their boiling points make them suitable as refrigerants. CFCs are far less flammable than methane, in part because they contain fewer C–H bonds and in part because, in the case of the chlorides and bromides, the released halides quench the free radicals that sustain flames.

The densities of CFCs are higher than their corresponding alkanes. In general, the density of these compounds correlates with the number of chlorides.

CFCs and HCFCs are usually produced by halogen exchange starting from chlorinated methanes and ethanes. Written below is the synthesis of chlorodifluoromethane from chloroform:

HCCl_{3} + 2 HF → HCF_{2}Cl + 2 HCl

Brominated derivatives are generated by free-radical reactions of hydrochlorofluorocarbons, replacing C–H bonds with C–Br bonds. The production of the anesthetic 2-bromo-2-chloro-1,1,1-trifluoroethane ("halothane") is written out below:

CF_{3}CH_{2}Cl + Br_{2} → CF_{3}CHBrCl + HBr

== Applications ==
CFCs and HCFCs are used in various applications because of their low toxicity, reactivity and flammability. Every permutation of fluorine, chlorine and hydrogen based on methane and ethane has been examined and most have been commercialized. Furthermore, many examples are known for higher numbers of carbon as well as related compounds containing bromine. Uses include refrigerants, blowing agents, aerosol propellants in medicinal applications, and degreasing solvents.

Billions of kilograms of chlorodifluoromethane are produced annually as a precursor to tetrafluoroethylene, the monomer that is converted into Teflon.

== Classes of compounds and Numbering System ==
- Chlorofluorocarbons (CFCs): when derived from methane and ethane, these compounds have the formulae CCl_{m}F_{4−m} and C_{2}Cl_{m}F_{6−m}, where m is nonzero.
- Hydro-chlorofluorocarbons (HCFCs): when derived from methane and ethane, these compounds have the formula CCl_{m}F_{n}H_{4−m−n} and C_{2}Cl_{x}F_{y}H_{6−x−y}, where m, n, x, and y are nonzero.
- Bromofluorocarbons (BFCs): have formulae similar to the CFCs and HCFCs, but also include bromine.
- Hydrofluorocarbons (HFCs): when derived from methane, ethane, propane, and butane, these compounds have the respective formulae CF_{m}H_{4−m}, C_{2}F_{m}H_{6−m}, C_{3}F_{m}H_{8−m}, and C_{4}F_{m}H_{10−m}, where m is nonzero.

=== Numbering system ===
A special numbering system is used for fluorinated alkanes, prefixed with Freon-, R-, CFC- and HCFC-, where the rightmost value indicates the number of fluorine atoms, the next value to the left is the number of hydrogen atoms plus 1, and the next value to the left is the number of carbon atoms less one (zeroes are not stated), and the remaining atoms are chlorine.

Freon-12, for example, indicates a methane derivative (only two numbers) containing two fluorine atoms (the second 2) and no hydrogen (1 − 1 = 0). It is therefore CCl_{2}F_{2}.

Another equation that can be applied to get the correct molecular formula of the CFC/R/Freon class compounds is to take the numbering and add 90 to it. The resulting value will give the number of carbons as the first numeral, the second numeral gives the number of hydrogen atoms, and the third numeral gives the number of fluorine atoms. The rest of the unaccounted carbon bonds are occupied by chlorine atoms. The value of this equation is always a three figure number. An easy example is that of CFC-12, which gives: 90+12=102 -> 1 carbon, 0 hydrogens, 2 fluorine atoms, and hence 2 chlorine atoms resulting in CCl_{2}F_{2}. The main advantage of this method of deducing the molecular composition in comparison with the method described in the paragraph above is that it gives the number of carbon atoms of the molecule.

Freons containing bromine are signified by four numbers. Isomers, which are common for ethane and propane derivatives, are indicated by letters following the numbers:

Principal CFCs
Systematic name	Common/trivial name(s), code	Boiling point (°C)	Formula
Trichlorofluoromethane	Freon-11, R-11, CFC-11	23.77	CCl_{3}F
Dichlorodifluoromethane	Freon-12, R-12, CFC-12	−29.8	CCl_{2}F_{2}
Chlorotrifluoromethane	Freon-13, R-13, CFC-13	−81	CClF_{3}
Dichlorofluoromethane	R-21, HCFC-21	8.9	CHCl_{2}F
Chlorodifluoromethane	R-22, HCFC-22	−40.8	CHClF_{2}
Chlorofluoromethane	Freon 31, R-31, HCFC-31	−9.1	CH_{2}ClF
Bromochlorodifluoromethane	BCF, Halon 1211, H-1211, Freon 12B1	−3.7	CBrClF_{2}
1,1,2-Trichloro-1,2,2-trifluoroethane	Freon 113, R-113, CFC-113, 1,1,2-Trichlorotrifluoroethane	47.7	Cl_{2}FC−CClF_{2}
1,1,1-Trichloro-2,2,2-trifluoroethane	Freon 113a, R-113a, CFC-113a	45.9	Cl_{3}C−CF_{3}
1,2-Dichloro-1,1,2,2-tetrafluoroethane	Freon 114, R-114, CFC-114, Dichlorotetrafluoroethane	3.8	ClF_{2}C−CClF_{2}
1,1-Dichloro-1,2,2,2-tetrafluoroethane	CFC-114a, R-114a	3.4	Cl_{2}FC−CF_{3}
1-Chloro-1,1,2,2,2-pentafluoroethane	Freon 115, R-115, CFC-115, Chloropentafluoroethane	−38	ClF_{2}C−CF_{3}
2-Chloro-1,1,1,2-tetrafluoroethane	R-124, HCFC-124	−12	CHFClCF_{3}
1,1-Dichloro-1-fluoroethane	R-141b, HCFC-141b	32	Cl_{2}FC−CH_{3}
1-Chloro-1,1-difluoroethane	R-142b, HCFC-142b	−9.2	ClF_{2}C−CH_{3}
Tetrachloro-1,2-difluoroethane	Freon 112, R-112, CFC-112	91.5	CCl_{2}FCCl_{2}F
Tetrachloro-1,1-difluoroethane	Freon 112a, R-112a, CFC-112a	91.5	CClF_{2}CCl_{3}
1,1,2-Trichlorotrifluoroethane	Freon 113, R-113, CFC-113	48	CCl_{2}FCClF_{2}
1-bromo-2-chloro-1,1,2-trifluoroethane	Halon 2311a	51.7	CHClFCBrF_{2}
2-bromo-2-chloro-1,1,1-trifluoroethane	Halon 2311	50.2	CF_{3}CHBrCl
1,1-Dichloro-2,2,3,3,3-pentafluoropropane	R-225ca, HCFC-225ca	51	CF_{3}CF_{2}CHCl_{2}
1,3-Dichloro-1,2,2,3,3-pentafluoropropane	R-225cb, HCFC-225cb	56	CClF_{2}CF_{2}CHClF

== Reactions ==
The reaction of the CFCs which is responsible for the depletion of ozone, is the photo-induced scission of a C-Cl bond:

CCl_{3}F → CCl_{2}F^{•} + Cl^{•}

The chlorine atom, written often as Cl^{•}, behaves very differently from the chlorine molecule (Cl_{2}). The radical Cl^{•} is long-lived in the upper atmosphere, where it catalyzes the conversion of ozone into O_{2}. Ozone absorbs UV-B radiation, so its depletion allows more of this high energy radiation to reach the Earth's surface. Bromine atoms are even more efficient catalysts; hence brominated CFCs are also regulated.

== Impact as greenhouse gases ==
The warming influence of greenhouse gases in the atmosphere has increased substantially in recent years. The rising presence of carbon dioxide from fossil fuel burning is the largest overall driver. The relatively smaller but significant warming impact from releases of the most abundantly produced CFCs (CFC11 and CFC12) will continue to persist for many further decades into the future.

CFCs were phased out via the Montreal Protocol due to their part in ozone depletion.

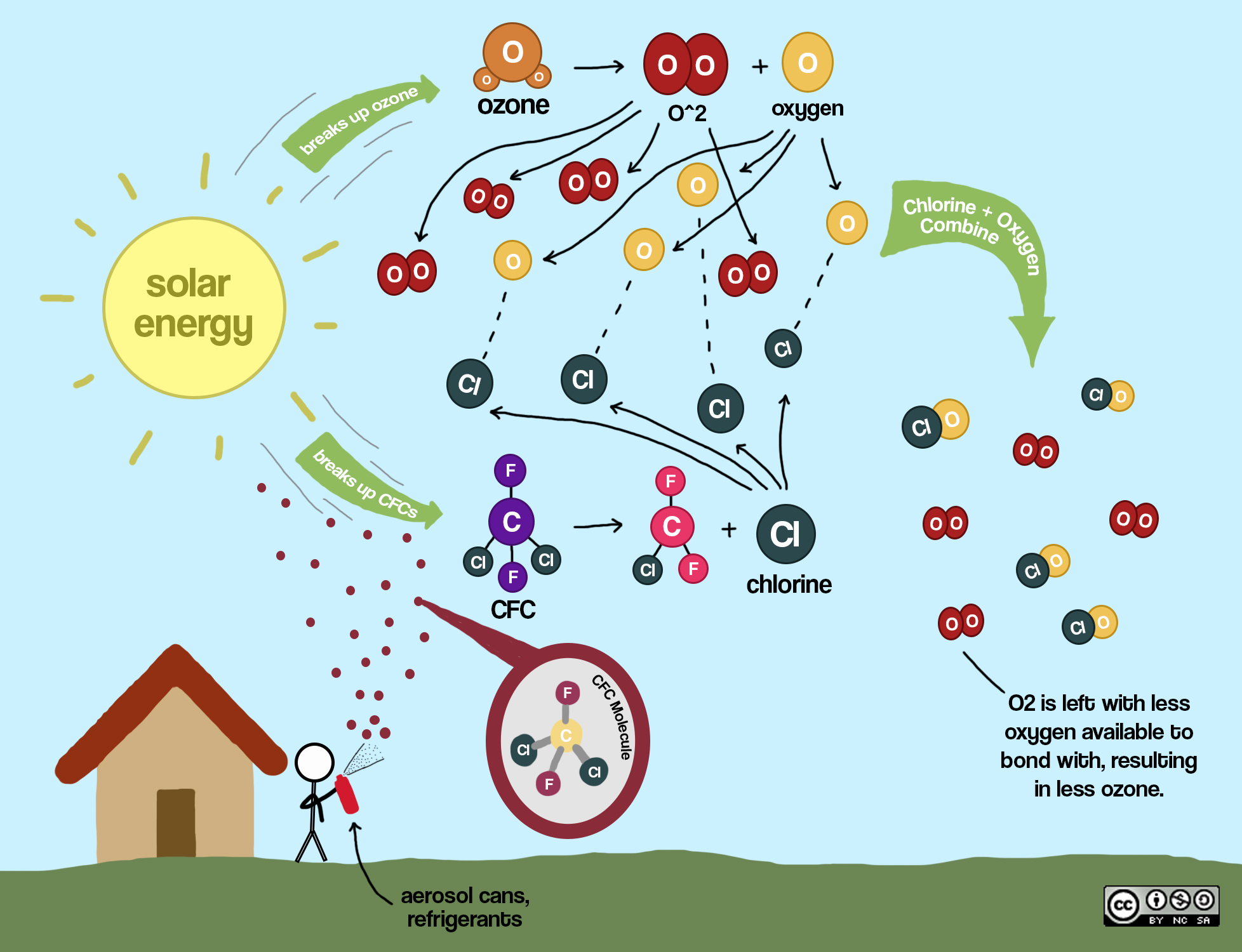
CFCs negatively affecting stratospheric ozone production

The atmospheric impacts of CFCs are not limited to their role as ozone-depleting chemicals. Infrared absorption bands prevent heat at that wavelength from escaping Earth's atmosphere. CFCs have their strongest absorption bands from C-F and C-Cl bonds in the spectral region of 7.8–15.3 μm—referred to as the "atmospheric window" due to the relative transparency of the atmosphere within this region.

The strength of CFC absorption bands and the unique susceptibility of the atmosphere at wavelengths where CFCs (indeed all covalent fluorine compounds) absorb radiation creates a "super" greenhouse effect from CFCs and other unreactive fluorine-containing gases such as perfluorocarbons, HFCs, HCFCs, bromofluorocarbons, SF_{6}, and NF_{3}. This "atmospheric window" absorption is intensified by the low concentration of each individual CFC. Because CO_{2} is close to saturation with high concentrations and few infrared absorption bands, the radiation budget and hence the greenhouse effect has low sensitivity to changes in CO_{2} concentration; the increase in temperature is roughly logarithmic. Conversely, the low concentration of CFCs allow their effects to increase linearly with mass, so that chlorofluorocarbons are greenhouse gases with a much higher potential to enhance the greenhouse effect than CO_{2}.

Groups are actively disposing of legacy CFCs to reduce their impact on the atmosphere.

According to NASA in 2018, the hole in the ozone layer has begun to recover as a result of CFC bans. However, research released in 2019 reported an alarming increase in CFCs, pointing to unregulated use in China.

== History ==
Prior to, and during the 1920s, refrigerators used toxic gases as refrigerants, including ammonia, sulphur dioxide, and chloromethane. Later in the 1920s after a series of fatal accidents involving the leaking of chloromethane from refrigerators, a major collaborative effort began between American corporations Frigidaire, General Motors, and DuPont to develop a safer, non-toxic alternative. Thomas Midgley Jr. of General Motors is credited for synthesizing the first chlorofluorocarbons. The Frigidaire corporation was issued the first patent, number 1,886,339, for the formula for CFCs on 31 December 1928. In a demonstration for the American Chemical Society, Midgley flamboyantly demonstrated all these properties by inhaling a breath of the gas and using it to blow out a candle in 1930.

By 1930, General Motors and Du Pont formed the Kinetic Chemical Company to produce Freon, and by 1935, over 8 million refrigerators utilizing R-12 were sold by Frigidaire and its competitors. In 1932, Carrier began using R-11 in the worlds first self-contained home air conditioning unit known as the "atmospheric cabinet". As a result of CFCs being largely non-toxic, they quickly became the coolant of choice in large air-conditioning systems. Public health codes in cities were revised to designate chlorofluorocarbons as the only gases that could be used as refrigerants in public buildings.

Growth in CFCs continued over the following decades leading to peak annual sales of over 1 billion USD with greater than 1 million metric tonnes being produced annually. It wasn't until 1974 that it was first discovered by two University of California chemists, Professor F. Sherwood Rowland and Dr. Mario Molina, that the use of chlorofluorocarbons were causing a significant depletion in atmospheric ozone concentrations. This initiated the environmental effort which eventually resulted in the enactment of the Montreal Protocol.

=== Commercial development and use in fire extinguishing ===

During World War II, various chloroalkanes were in standard use in military aircraft, although these early halons suffered from excessive toxicity. Nevertheless, after the war they slowly became more common in civil aviation as well. In the 1960s, fluoroalkanes and bromofluoroalkanes became available and were quickly recognized as being highly effective fire-fighting materials. Much early research with Halon 1301 was conducted under the auspices of the US Armed Forces, while Halon 1211 was, initially, mainly developed in the UK. By the late 1960s they were standard in many applications where water and dry-powder extinguishers posed a threat of damage to the protected property, including computer rooms, telecommunications switches, laboratories, museums and art collections. Beginning with warships, in the 1970s, bromofluoroalkanes also progressively came to be associated with rapid knockdown of severe fires in confined spaces with minimal risk to personnel.

By the early 1980s, bromofluoroalkanes were in common use on aircraft, ships, and large vehicles as well as in computer facilities and galleries. However, concern was beginning to be expressed about the impact of chloroalkanes and bromoalkanes on the ozone layer. The Vienna Convention for the Protection of the Ozone Layer did not cover bromofluoroalkanes under the same restrictions, because emergency discharge of extinguishing systems was thought to be too small in volume to produce a significant impact and too important to human safety for restriction. Instead, the consumption of bromofluoroalkanes was frozen at 1986 levels.

=== Regulation ===
Since the late 1970s, the use of CFCs has been heavily regulated because of their destructive effects on the ozone layer. After the development of his electron capture detector, James Lovelock was the first to detect the widespread presence of CFCs in the air, finding a mole fraction of 60 ppt of CFC-11 over Ireland. In a self-funded research expedition ending in 1973, Lovelock went on to measure CFC-11 in both the Arctic and Antarctic, finding the presence of the gas in each of 50 air samples collected, and concluding that CFCs are not hazardous to the environment. The experiment did however provide the first useful data on the presence of CFCs in the atmosphere. The damage caused by CFCs was discovered by Sherry Rowland and Mario Molina who, after hearing a lecture on the subject of Lovelock's work, embarked on research resulting in the first publication suggesting the connection in 1974. It turns out that one of CFCs' most attractive features—their low reactivity—is key to their most destructive effects. CFCs' lack of reactivity gives them a lifespan that can exceed 100 years, giving them time to diffuse into the upper stratosphere. Once in the stratosphere, the sun's ultraviolet radiation is strong enough to cause the homolytic cleavage of the C-Cl bond. In 1976, under the Toxic Substances Control Act, the EPA banned commercial manufacturing and use of CFCs and aerosol propellants. This was later superseded in the 1990 amendments to the Clean Air Act to address stratospheric ozone depletion.

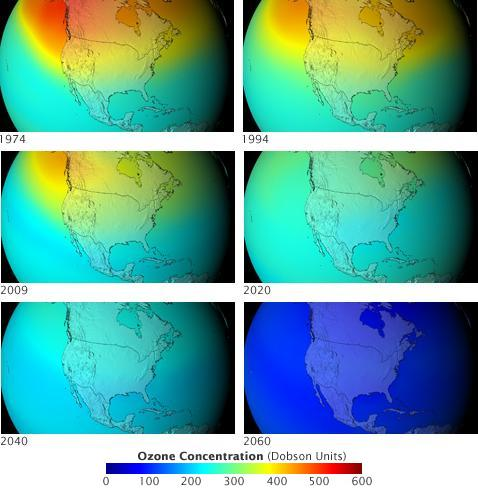
NASA projection of stratospheric ozone, in Dobson units, if chlorofluorocarbons had not been banned. Animated version.

By 1987, in response to a dramatic seasonal depletion of the ozone layer over Antarctica, diplomats in Montreal forged a treaty, the Montreal Protocol, which called for drastic reductions in the production of CFCs. On 2 March 1989, 12 European Community nations agreed to ban the production of all CFCs by the end of the century. In 1990, diplomats met in London and voted to significantly strengthen the Montreal Protocol by calling for a complete elimination of CFCs by 2000. By 2010, CFCs should have been completely eliminated from developing countries as well.

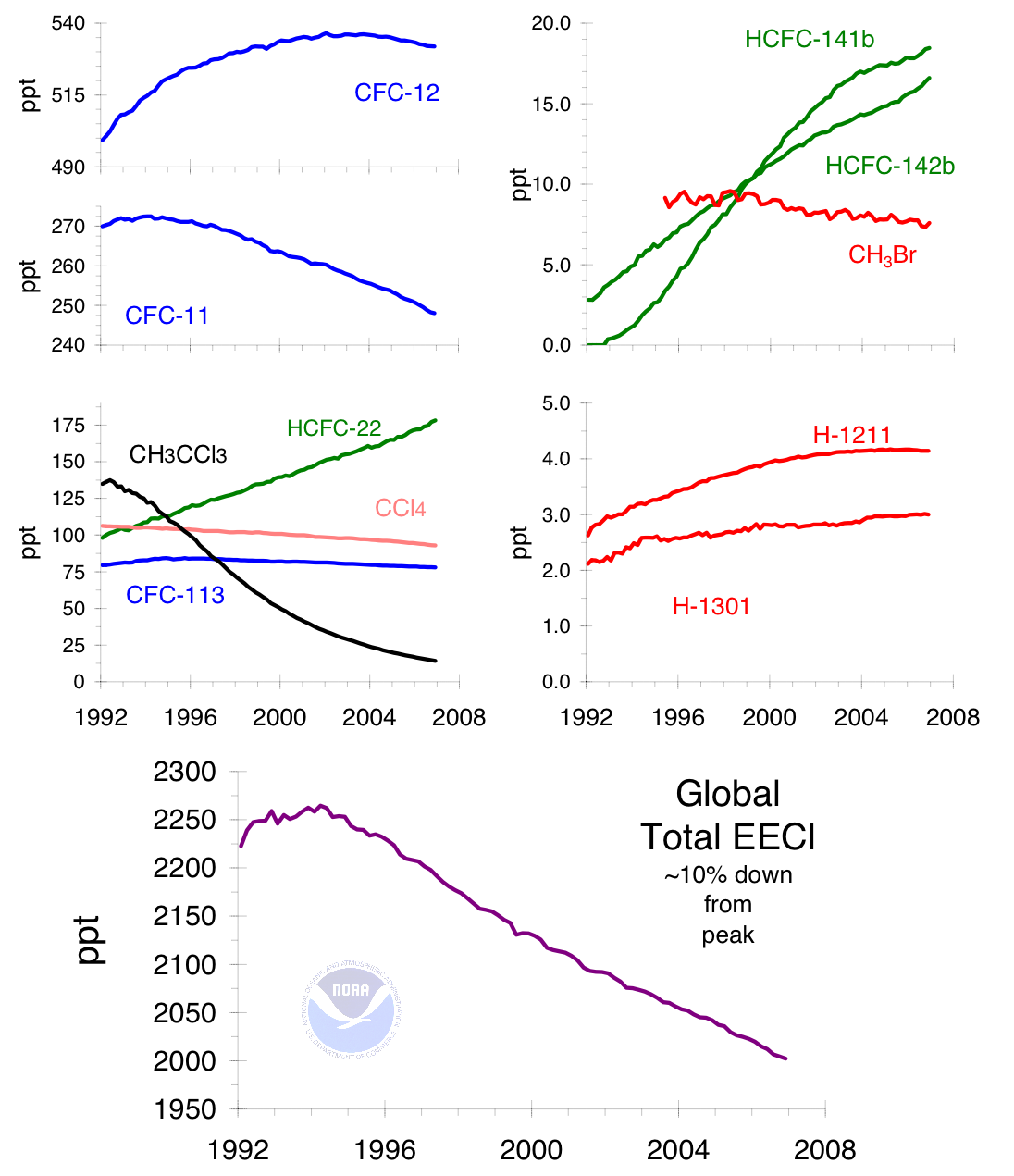
Ozone-depleting gas trends

Because the only CFCs available to countries adhering to the treaty is from recycling, their prices have increased considerably. A worldwide end to production should also terminate the smuggling of this material. However, there are current CFC smuggling issues, as recognized by the United Nations Environmental Programme (UNEP) in a 2006 report titled "Illegal Trade in Ozone Depleting Substances". UNEP estimates that between 16,000–38,000 tonnes of CFCs passed through the black market in the mid-1990s. The report estimated between 7,000 and 14,000 tonnes of CFCs are smuggled annually into developing countries. Asian countries are those with the most smuggling; as of 2007, China, India and South Korea were found to account for around 70% of global CFC production, South Korea later to ban CFC production in 2010. Possible reasons for continued CFC smuggling were also examined: the report noted that many of the refrigeration systems that were designed to be operated utilizing the banned CFC products have long lifespans and continue to operate. The cost of replacing the equipment of these items is sometimes cheaper than outfitting them with a more ozone-friendly appliance. Additionally, CFC smuggling is not considered a significant issue, so the perceived penalties for smuggling are low. In 2018 public attention was drawn to the issue, that at an unknown place in east Asia an estimated amount of 13,000 metric tons annually of CFCs have been produced since about 2012 in violation of the protocol. While the eventual phaseout of CFCs is likely, efforts are being taken to stem these current non-compliance problems.

By the time of the Montreal Protocol, it was realised that deliberate and accidental discharges during system tests and maintenance accounted for substantially larger volumes than emergency discharges, and consequently halons were brought into the treaty, albeit with many exceptions.

==== Regulatory gap ====
While the production and consumption of CFCs are regulated under the Montreal Protocol, emissions from existing banks of CFCs are not regulated under the agreement. In 2002, there were an estimated 5,791 kilotons of CFCs in existing products such as refrigerators, air conditioners, aerosol cans and others. Approximately one-third of these CFCs are projected to be emitted over the next decade if action is not taken, posing a threat to both the ozone layer and the climate. A proportion of these CFCs can be safely captured and destroyed by means of high temperature, controlled incineration which destroys the CFC molecule.

==== Regulation and DuPont ====
In 1978 the United States banned the use of CFCs such as Freon in aerosol cans, the beginning of a long series of regulatory actions against their use. The critical DuPont manufacturing patent for Freon ("Process for Fluorinating Halohydrocarbons", U.S. Patent #3258500) was set to expire in 1979. In conjunction with other industrial peers DuPont formed a lobbying group, the "Alliance for Responsible CFC Policy", to combat regulations of ozone-depleting compounds. In 1986 DuPont, with new patents in hand, reversed its previous stance and publicly condemned CFCs. DuPont representatives appeared before the Montreal Protocol urging that CFCs be banned worldwide and stated that their new HCFCs would meet the worldwide demand for refrigerants.

=== Phasing-out of CFCs ===
Use of certain chloroalkanes as solvents for large scale application, such as dry cleaning, have been phased out, for example, by the IPPC directive on greenhouse gases in 1994 and by the volatile organic compounds (VOC) directive of the EU in 1997. Permitted chlorofluoroalkane uses are medicinal only.

Bromofluoroalkanes have been largely phased out and the possession of equipment for their use is prohibited in some countries like the Netherlands and Belgium, from 1 January 2004, based on the Montreal Protocol and guidelines of the European Union.

Production of new stocks ceased in most (probably all) countries in 1994. However many countries still require aircraft to be fitted with halon fire suppression systems because no safe and completely satisfactory alternative has been discovered for this application. There are also a few other, highly specialized uses. These programs recycle halon through "halon banks" coordinated by the Halon Recycling Corporation to ensure that discharge to the atmosphere occurs only in a genuine emergency and to conserve remaining stocks.

The interim replacements for CFCs are hydrochlorofluorocarbons (HCFCs), which deplete stratospheric ozone, but to a much lesser extent than CFCs. Ultimately, hydrofluorocarbons (HFCs) will replace HCFCs. Unlike CFCs and HCFCs, HFCs have an ozone depletion potential (ODP) of 0. DuPont began producing hydrofluorocarbons as alternatives to Freon in the 1980s. These included Suva refrigerants and Dymel propellants. Natural refrigerants are climate friendly solutions that are enjoying increasing support from large companies and governments interested in reducing global warming emissions from refrigeration and air conditioning.

=== Phasing-out of HFCs and HCFCs ===
Hydrofluorocarbons are included in the Kyoto Protocol and are regulated under the Kigali Amendment to the Montreal Protocol due to their very high Global Warming Potential (GWP) and the recognition of halocarbon contributions to climate change.

On 21 September 2007, approximately 200 countries agreed to accelerate the elimination of hydrochlorofluorocarbons entirely by 2020 in a United Nations-sponsored Montreal summit. Developing nations were given until 2030. Many nations, such as the United States and China, who had previously resisted such efforts, agreed with the accelerated phase out schedule. India successfully achieved the complete phase out of HCFC-141 b in 2020.

It was reported that levels of HCFCs in the atmosphere had started to fall in 2021 due to their phase out under the Montreal Protocol.

=== Properly collecting, controlling, and destroying CFCs and HCFCs ===
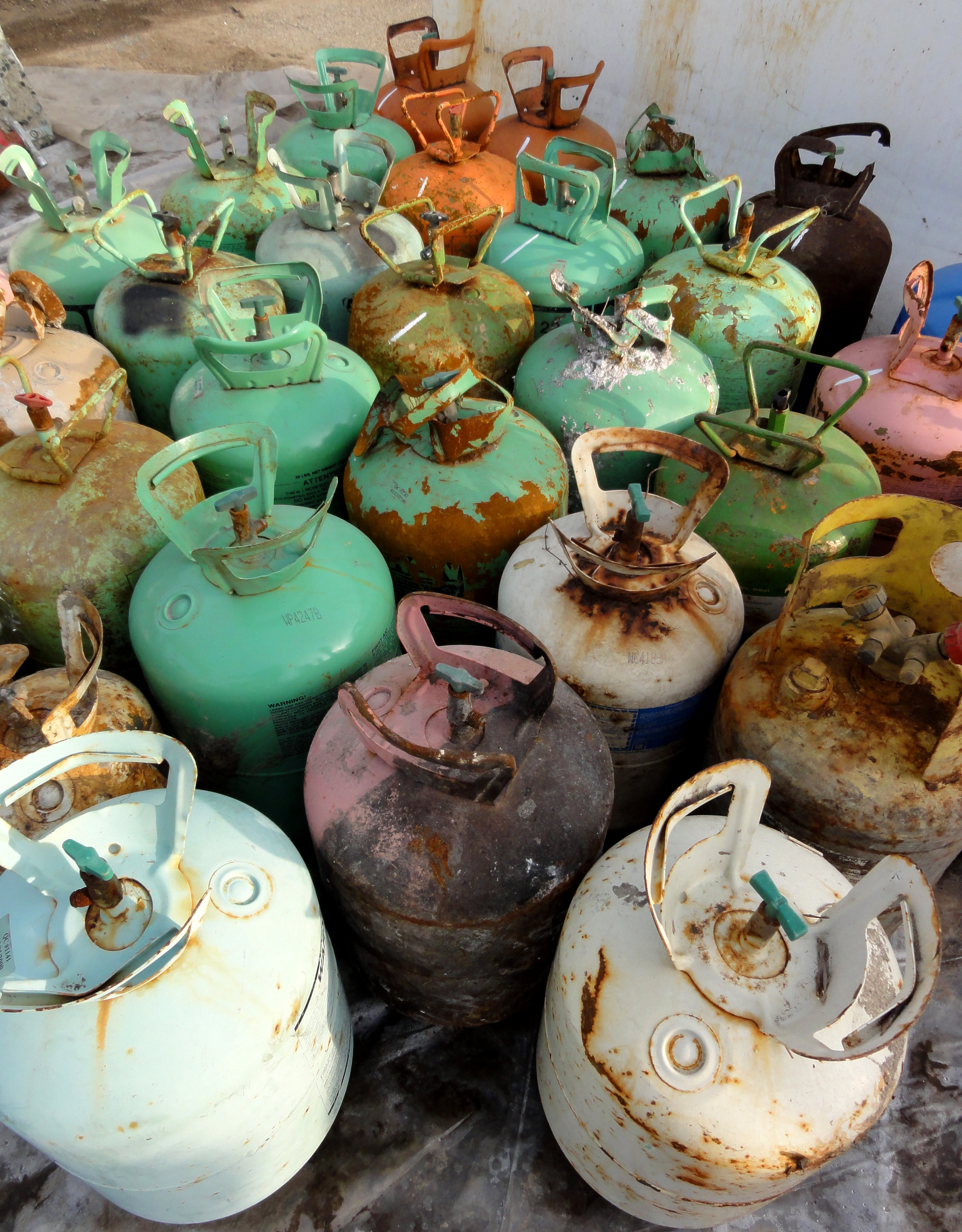
Freon tanks awaiting CFC reclamation and container recycling in 2012

While new production of these refrigerants has been banned, large volumes still exist in older systems and have been said to pose an immediate threat to our environment. Preventing the release of these harmful refrigerants has been ranked as one of the single most effective actions we can take to mitigate catastrophic climate change.

=== Development of alternatives for CFCs ===
Work on alternatives for chlorofluorocarbons in refrigerants began in the late 1970s after the first warnings of damage to stratospheric ozone were published.

The hydrochlorofluorocarbons (HCFCs) are less stable in the lower atmosphere, enabling them to break down before reaching the ozone layer. Nevertheless, a significant fraction of the HCFCs do break down in the stratosphere and they have contributed to more chlorine buildup there than originally predicted. Later alternatives lacking the chlorine, the hydrofluorocarbons (HFCs) have an even shorter lifetimes in the lower atmosphere. One of these compounds, HFC-134a, were used in place of CFC-12 in automobile air conditioners. Hydrocarbon refrigerants (a propane/isobutane blend) were also used extensively in mobile air conditioning systems in Australia, the US and many other countries, as they had excellent thermodynamic properties and performed particularly well in high ambient temperatures. 1,1-Dichloro-1-fluoroethane (HCFC-141b) has replaced HFC-134a, due to its low ODP and GWP values. And according to the Montreal Protocol, HCFC-141b is supposed to be phased out completely and replaced with zero ODP substances such as cyclopentane, HFOs, and HFC-345a before January 2020.

Among the natural refrigerants (along with ammonia and carbon dioxide), hydrocarbons have negligible environmental impacts and are also used worldwide in domestic and commercial refrigeration applications, and are becoming available in new split system air conditioners. Various other solvents and methods have replaced the use of CFCs in laboratory analytics.

In Metered-dose inhalers (MDI), a non-ozone effecting substitute was developed as a propellant, known as "hydrofluoroalkane".

Applications and replacements for CFCs
Application	Previously used CFC	Replacement
Refrigeration & air-conditioning	CFC-12 (CCl_{2}F_{2}); CFC-11 (CCl_{3}F); CFC-13 (CClF_{3}); HCFC-22 (CHClF_{2}); CFC-113 (Cl_{2}FCCClF_{2}); CFC-114 (CClF_{2}CClF_{2}); CFC-115 (CF_{3}CClF_{2});	HFC-23 (CHF_{3}); HFC-134a (CF_{3}CFH_{2}); HFC-507 [1:1 azeotrope of HFC-125 (CF_{3}CHF_{2}) and HFC-143a (CF_{3}CH_{3})]; HFC-410 [1:1 azeotrope of HFC-32 (CF_{2}H_{2}) and HFC-125 (CF_{3}CF_{2}H)]
Propellants in medicinal aerosols	CFC-114 (CClF_{2}CClF_{2})	HFC-134a (CF_{3}CFH_{2}); HFC-227ea (CF_{3}CHFCF_{3})
Blowing agents for foams	CFC-11 (CCl_{3}F); CFC 113 (Cl_{2}FCCClF_{2}); HCFC-141b (CCl_{2}FCH_{3})	HFC-245fa (CF_{3}CH_{2}CHF_{2}); HFC-365mfc (CF_{3}CH_{2}CF_{2}CH_{3})
Solvents, degreasing agents, cleaning agents	CFC-11 (CCl_{3}F); CFC-113 (CCl_{2}FCClF_{2})	HCFC-225cb (C_{3}HCl_{2}F_{5})

=== Development of Hydrofluoroolefins as alternatives to CFCs and HCFCs ===
The development of Hydrofluoroolefins (HFOs) as replacements for Hydrochlorofluorocarbons and Hydrofluorocarbons began after the Kigali amendment to the Montreal Protocol in 2016, which called for the phase out of high global warming potential (GWP) refrigerants and to replace them with other refrigerants with a lower GWP, closer to that of carbon dioxide. HFOs have an ozone depletion potential of 0.0, compared to the 1.0 of principal CFC-11, and a low GWP which make them environmentally safer alternatives to CFCs, HCFCs and HFCs.

Hydrofluoroolefins serve as functional replacements for applications where high GWP hydrofluorocarbons were once used. In April 2022, the EPA signed a pre-published final rule Listing of HFO-1234yf under the Significant New Alternatives Policy (SNAP) Program for Motor Vehicle Air Conditioning in Nonroad Vehicles and Servicing Fittings for Small Refrigerant Cans. This ruling allows HFO-1234yf to take over in applications where ozone depleting CFCs such as R-12, and high GWP HFCs such as R-134a were once used. The phaseout and replacement of CFCs and HFCs in the automotive industry will ultimately reduce the release of these gases to atmosphere and in turn have a positive contribution to the mitigation of climate change.

== Tracer of ocean circulation ==
Since the history of CFC concentrations in the atmosphere is relatively well known, they have provided an important constraint on ocean circulation. CFCs dissolve in seawater at the ocean surface and are subsequently transported into the ocean interior. Because CFCs are inert, their concentration in the ocean interior reflects simply the convolution of their atmospheric time evolution and ocean circulation and mixing.

The entry of CFCs into the ocean makes them extremely useful as transient tracers to estimate rates and pathways of ocean circulation and mixing processes. However, due to production restrictions of CFCs in the 1980s, atmospheric concentrations of CFC-11 and CFC-12 has stopped increasing, and the CFC-11 to CFC-12 ratio in the atmosphere have been steadily decreasing, making water dating of water masses more problematic. Incidentally, production and release of sulfur hexafluoride (SF_{6}) have rapidly increased in the atmosphere since the 1970s. Similar to CFCs, SF_{6} is also an inert gas and is not affected by oceanic chemical or biological activities. Thus, using CFCs in concert with SF_{6} as a tracer resolves the water dating issues due to decreased CFC concentrations.

Using CFCs or SF_{6} as a tracer of ocean circulation allows for the derivation of rates for ocean processes due to the time-dependent source function. The elapsed time since a subsurface water mass was last in contact with the atmosphere is the tracer-derived age. Estimates of age can be derived based on the partial pressure of an individual compound and the ratio of the partial pressure of CFCs to each other (or SF_{6}).

The age of a water parcel can be estimated by the CFC partial pressure (pCFC) age or SF_{6} partial pressure (pSF_{6}) age. The pCFC age of a water sample is defined as:

$$pCFC = \frac{[CFC]}{F(T,S)}$$

where [CFC] is the measured CFC concentration (pmol kg^{−1}) and F is the solubility of CFC gas in seawater as a function of temperature and salinity. The CFC partial pressure is expressed in units of 10–12 atmospheres or parts-per-trillion (ppt). The solubility measurements of CFC-11 and CFC-12 have been previously measured by Warner and Weiss Additionally, the solubility measurement of CFC-113 was measured by Bu and Warner and SF_{6} by Wanninkhof et al. and Bullister et al. Theses authors mentioned above have expressed the solubility (F) at a total pressure of 1 atm as:

$$\ln F = a_1 + a_2\left(\frac{100}{T}\right) + a_3\ln\left(\frac{T}{100}\right) + a_4\left(\frac{T}{100}\right)^2 + S\left[b_1 + b_2\left(\frac{T}{100}\right) + b_3\left(\frac{T}{100}\right)^2\right]$$

where F = solubility expressed in either mol l^{−1} or mol kg^{−1} atm^{−1}, T = absolute temperature, S = salinity in parts per thousand (ppt), a_{1}, a_{2}, a_{3}, b_{1}, b_{2}, and b_{3} are constants to be determined from the least squares fit to the solubility measurements. This equation is derived from the integrated Van 't Hoff equation and the logarithmic Setchenow salinity dependence.

It can be noted that the solubility of CFCs increase with decreasing temperature at approximately 1% per degree Celsius.

Once the partial pressure of the CFC (or SF_{6}) is derived, it is then compared to the atmospheric time histories for CFC-11, CFC-12, or SF_{6} in which the pCFC directly corresponds to the year with the same. The difference between the corresponding date and the collection date of the seawater sample is the average age for the water parcel. The age of a parcel of water can also be calculated using the ratio of two CFC partial pressures or the ratio of the SF_{6} partial pressure to a CFC partial pressure.

== Safety ==
According to their material safety data sheets, CFCs and HCFCs are colorless, volatile, non-toxic liquids and gases with a faintly sweet ethereal odor. Overexposure at concentrations of 11% or more may cause dizziness, loss of concentration, central nervous system depression or cardiac arrhythmia. Vapors displace air and can cause asphyxiation in confined spaces. Dermal absorption of chlorofluorocarbons is possible, but low. The pulmonary uptake of inhaled chlorofluorocarbons occurs quickly with peak blood concentrations, occurring in as little as 15 seconds with steady concentrations, and evening out after 20 minutes. Absorption of orally ingested chlorofluorocarbons is 35 to 48 times lower compared to inhalation. Although non-flammable, their combustion products include hydrofluoric acid and related species. Normal occupational exposure is rated at 0.07% and does not pose any serious health risks.
