= Trichlorofluoromethane (data page) =

Chemical data page

This is a supplementary data page for trichlorofluoromethane.

Property	Value
Density (ρ) at 0 °C	1.5432 g.cm^{−3}
Density (ρ) at 18.82 °C	1.4905 g.cm^{−3}
Critical density (ρ_{c})	4.151 mol.l^{−1}
Acentric factor (ω)	0.18875
Ozone depletion potential (ODP)	1 (by definition)
Global warming potential (GWP)	4600 (CO_{2} = 1)

This box:
- Except where noted otherwise, data relate to Standard temperature and pressure.
- Reliability of data general note.
