= 1,1-Dichlorotetrafluoroethane =

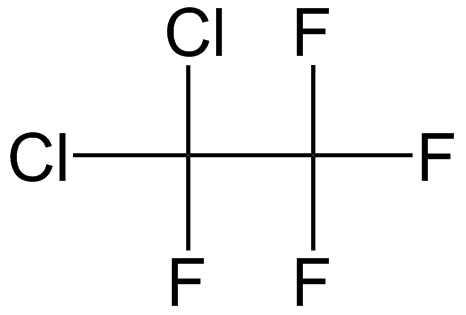

Names
- Preferred IUPAC name 1,1-Dichloro-1,2,2,2-tetrafluoroethane
- Other names R114a; CFC-114a

Identifiers
CAS Number	374-07-2
3D model (JSmol)	Interactive image
ChemSpider	9392
ECHA InfoCard	100.006.159
EC Number	206-774-8
PubChem CID	9775
UNII	8AWA8IET6R
CompTox Dashboard (EPA)	DTXSID9027150
- InChI: InChI=1S/C2Cl2F4/c3-1(4,5)2(6,7)8 Key: BAMUEXIPKSRTBS-UHFFFAOYSA-N
- SMILES: C(C(F)(Cl)Cl)(F)(F)F

Properties
Chemical formula	C_{2}Cl_{2}F_{4}
Molar mass	170.92 g·mol^{−1}
Density	1.455 g/cu cm (as a liquid under pressure)
Melting point	−56.6 °C (−69.9 °F; 216.6 K)
Boiling point	3.4 °C (38.1 °F; 276.5 K)
Solubility in water	137 mg/L
Solubility	benzene, diethyl ether, ethanol
log P	2.78
Vapor pressure	1640 mm Hg
Refractive index (n_{D})	1.3092 at 0 °C

Hazards
- GHS labelling
Pictograms	(GHS07: Exclamation mark) (GHS09: Environmental hazard)
Signal word	Danger
Hazard statements	H335, H336, H370, H420
Precautionary statements	P260, P264, P270, P271, P304+P340, P308+P316, P319, P321, P403+P233, P405, P501, P502

Related compounds
Related compounds	CFC-114
- Except where otherwise noted, data are given for materials in their standard state (at 25 °C [77 °F], 100 kPa). Infobox references

1,1-Dichlorotetrafluoroethane is a chlorofluorocarbon also known as CFC-114a or R114a by American Society of Heating, Refrigerating, and Air Conditioning Engineers. It has two chlorine atoms on one carbon atom and none on the other. It is one of two isomers of dichlorotetrafluoroethane, the other being 1,2-dichlorotetrafluoroethane, also known as CFC-114.

== Formation ==
1,1-Dichlorotetrafluoroethane can be made free from other isomers by reacting trichlorotrifluoroethane (CFC-113 or CFC-113a) with antimony pentachloride. Trichlorotrifluoroethane can also be reacted with sulfur tetrafluoride or dichlorodifluoromethane with aluminium fluoride catalyst to yield 1,1-dichlorotetrafluoroethane. The use of aluminium in the catalyst favours the asymmetric molecules.

It can also be made in a reaction of tetrachloroethylene with hydrogen fluoride and chlorine, but this results in a mixture.

Fluorinating 1,2-dichlorodifluoroethylene with fluorine produces a small amount of 1,1-dichlorotetrafluoroethane, but mostly tetrachlorotetrafluorobutene and some other chloroflurocarbons, so is not a good way.

== Properties ==
1,1-Dichlorotetrafluoroethane has a close boiling point (3.6°C) to the isomer 1,2-dichlorotetrafluoroethane (3.8°C), and so is difficult to separate by distillation. Also in a gas chromatograph, it is hard to distinguish from the symmetric 1,2 isomer.

Critical properties include critical temperature 145.7°C, critical pressure 4.92 MPa and critical density of 0.82 g/ml.

1,1-Dichlorotetrafluoroethane does not ignite in air.

=== Reactions ===
1,1-Dichlorotetrafluoroethane reacts with hydrogen when heated at 300 to 600°C with a palladium catalyst in a hydrodechlorination. The main reaction product is 1,1,1,2-tetrafluoroethane, but also 1-chloro-1,2,2,2-tetrafluoroethane (CF_{3}CHClF) and 1,1,1-trifluoroethane are formed.

1,1-Dichlorotetrafluoroethane reacts with alkali metals, alkaline earths and aluminium.

When heated with hydrogen over a nickel catalyst, 1,1-dichlorotetrafluoroethane is dechlorinated with replacement by hydrogen to yield a mixture of CF_{3}CHClF and the dimer CF_{3}CClFCClFCF_{3}.

== Use ==
CFC-114a was used in aerosol propellants, blowing agents, and in polyolefin foams. There was also use in refrigerants. Production was banned in by the Montreal Protocol.

CFC-114a is a possible intermediate in the production of HFC-134a which can be produced by hydrogenation.

== Atmosphere ==
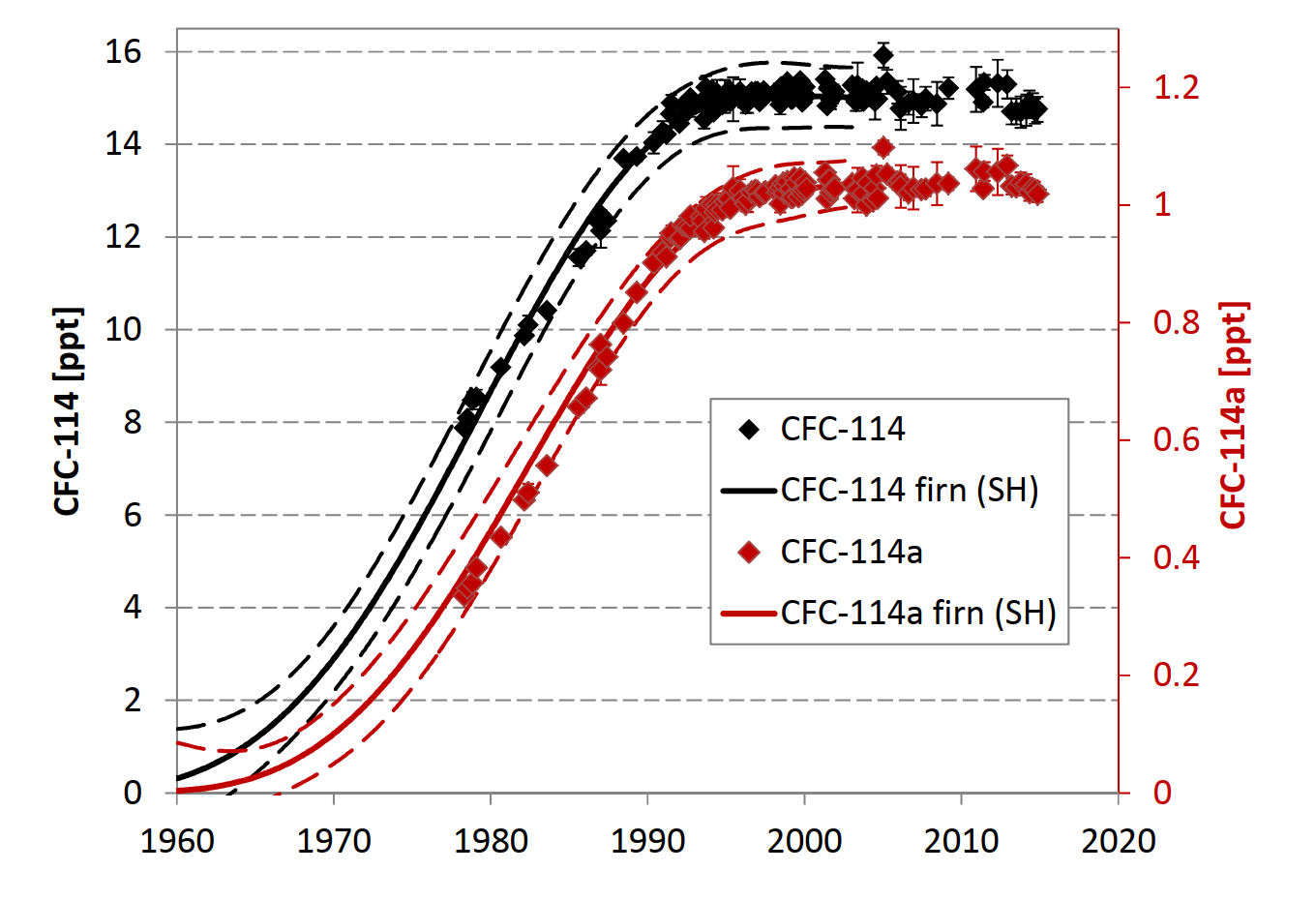
Mixing ratio of CFC-114a in air (red). Also CFC-114 in black

The ozone depletion potential of 1,1-dichlorotetrafluoroethane is 0.72. The estimated lifetime in the atmosphere is about 100 years. The radiative efficiency is 0.28 Wm^{−2}ppb^{−1}. Global warming potential in 20 years is 6750. The atmospheric concentration of CFC-114a is not usually measured separately from CFC-114 due to difficulties in distinguishing them apart.

In 1978 atmospheric levels of CFC-114a were 0.35 ppt. By 2020 the level was up to 1.13 ppt. CFC-114a appears to be emitted into the atmosphere is South East Asia.

The atmospheric natural destruction of CFC-114a is by reaction with atomic oxygen, or breakup by ultraviolet light. As of 2014 about 250 tons per year of CFC-114a were being put into the atmosphere.
