= Trichlorofluoromethane =

Type of chlorofluorocarbon (CFC-11)

Names
- Preferred IUPAC name Trichloro(fluoro)methane
- Other names Trichlorofluoromethane; Fluorotrichloromethane; Fluorochloroform; Freon 11; CFC 11; R 11; Arcton 9 Freon 11A; Freon 11B; Freon HE; Freon MF

Identifiers
CAS Number	75-69-4
3D model (JSmol)	Interactive image; Interactive image
ChEBI	CHEBI:48236
ChEMBL	ChEMBL348290
ChemSpider	6149
ECHA InfoCard	100.000.812
EC Number	200-892-3
PubChem CID	6389
RTECS number	PB6125000
UNII	990TYB331R
CompTox Dashboard (EPA)	DTXSID5021384
- InChI: InChI=1S/CCl3F/c2-1(3,4)5 Key: CYRMSUTZVYGINF-UHFFFAOYSA-N; InChI=1/CCl3F/c2-1(3,4)5
- SMILES: C(F)(Cl)(Cl)Cl; ClC(Cl)(Cl)F

Properties
Chemical formula	CCl_{3}F
Molar mass	137.36 g·mol^{−1}
Appearance	Colorless liquid/gas
Odor	nearly odorless
Density	1.494 g/cm^{3}
Melting point	−110.48 °C (−166.86 °F; 162.67 K)
Boiling point	23.77 °C (74.79 °F; 296.92 K)
Critical point (T, P)	198 °C (471 K), 4.410 MPa (44.1 bar)
Solubility in water	1.1 g/L (at 20 °C)
log P	2.53
Vapor pressure	89 kPa at 20 °C; 131 kPa at 30 °C
Thermal conductivity	0.0079 W m^{−1} K^{−1} (gas at 300 K, ignoring pressure dependence)
Refractive index (n_{D})	1.3821
Dipole moment	0.450 D

Hazards
- GHS labelling
Pictograms	(GHS07: Exclamation mark)
Signal word	Warning
Hazard statements	H420
Precautionary statements	P502
Flash point	Non-flammable
- Lethal dose or concentration (LD, LC)
LC_{Lo} (lowest published)	26,200 ppm (rat, 4 hr); 100,000 ppm (rat, 20 min); 100,000 ppm (rat, 2 hr)
- NIOSH (US health exposure limits)
PEL (Permissible)	TWA 1000 ppm (5600 mg/m^{3})
REL (Recommended)	C 1000 ppm (5600 mg/m^{3})
IDLH (Immediate danger)	2000 ppm
Safety data sheet (SDS)	ICSC 0047

Supplementary data page
- Trichlorofluoromethane (data page)
- Except where otherwise noted, data are given for materials in their standard state (at 25 °C [77 °F], 100 kPa). verify (what is ?) Infobox references

Trichlorofluoromethane, also called freon-11, CFC-11, or R-11, is a chlorofluorocarbon (CFC). It is a colorless, faintly ethereal, and sweetish-smelling liquid that boils around room temperature. CFC-11 is a Class 1 ozone-depleting substance which damages Earth's protective stratospheric ozone layer. R-11 is not flammable at ambient temperature and pressure but it can become very combustible if heated and ignited by a strong ignition source.

== Historical use ==
Trichlorofluoromethane was first widely used as a refrigerant. Because of its high boiling point compared to most refrigerants, it can be used in systems with a low operating pressure, making the mechanical design of such systems less demanding than that of higher-pressure refrigerants R-12 or R-22.

Trichlorofluoromethane is used as a reference compound for fluorine-19 NMR studies.

Trichlorofluoromethane was formerly used in the drinking bird novelty, largely because it has a boiling point of 23.77 °C (74.79 °F). The replacement, dichloromethane, boiling point 39.6 °C (103.3 °F), requires a higher ambient temperature to work.

Trichlorofluoromethane was also used as an alternative to the flammable solvents ethanol or methanol in electronic spirit duplicator machines.

Prior to the knowledge of the ozone depletion potential of chlorine in refrigerants and other possible harmful effects on the environment, trichlorofluoromethane was sometimes used as a cleaning/rinsing agent for low-pressure systems.

== Production ==
Trichlorofluoromethane can be obtained by reacting carbon tetrachloride with hydrogen fluoride at 435 °C and 70 atm, producing a mixture of trichlorofluoromethane, tetrafluoromethane and dichlorodifluoromethane in a ratio of 77:18:5. The reaction can also be carried out in the presence of antimony(III) chloride or antimony(V) chloride:

CCl_{4} + HF → CCl_{3}F + CF_{4} + CCl_{2}F_{2}

Trichlorofluoromethane is also formed as one of the byproducts when graphite reacts with chlorine and hydrogen fluoride at 500 °C.

Sodium hexafluorosilicate under pressure at 270 °C, titanium(IV) fluoride, chlorine trifluoride, cobalt(III) fluoride, iodine pentafluoride, and bromine trifluoride are also suitable fluorinating agents for carbon tetrachloride.

CCl_{4} + Na_{2}SiF_{6} → CCl_{3}F + CCl_{2}F_{2} + CCl_{3}F + NaCl + SiF_{4}
CCl_{4} + BrF_{3} → BrF + CCl_{2}F_{2} + CCl_{3}F

Trichlorofluoromethane was included in the production moratorium in the Montreal Protocol of 1987. It is assigned an ozone depletion potential of 1.0, and U.S. production was ended on January 1, 1996.

== Regulatory challenges ==
In 2018, the atmospheric concentration of CFC-11 was noted by researchers to be declining more slowly than expected, and it subsequently emerged that it remains in widespread use as a blowing agent for polyurethane foam insulation in the construction industry of China. In 2021, researchers announced that emissions declined by 20,000 U.S. tons from 2018 to 2019, which mostly reversed the previous spike in emissions. In 2022, the European Commission announced an updated regulation that mandates the recovery and prevention of emissions of CFC-11 blowing agents from foam insulation in demolition waste, which is still emitted at significant scale.

== Dangers ==
R11, like most chlorofluorocarbons, forms phosgene gas when exposed to a naked flame.

== Use in Planetary Astrophysics ==
Because trichlorofluoromethane is one of the easiest to detect chlorofluorocarbons produced by anthropogenic activity, it has been used in attempting to detect industrial pollution in the atmospheres of earth-like exoplanets.

== Gallery ==
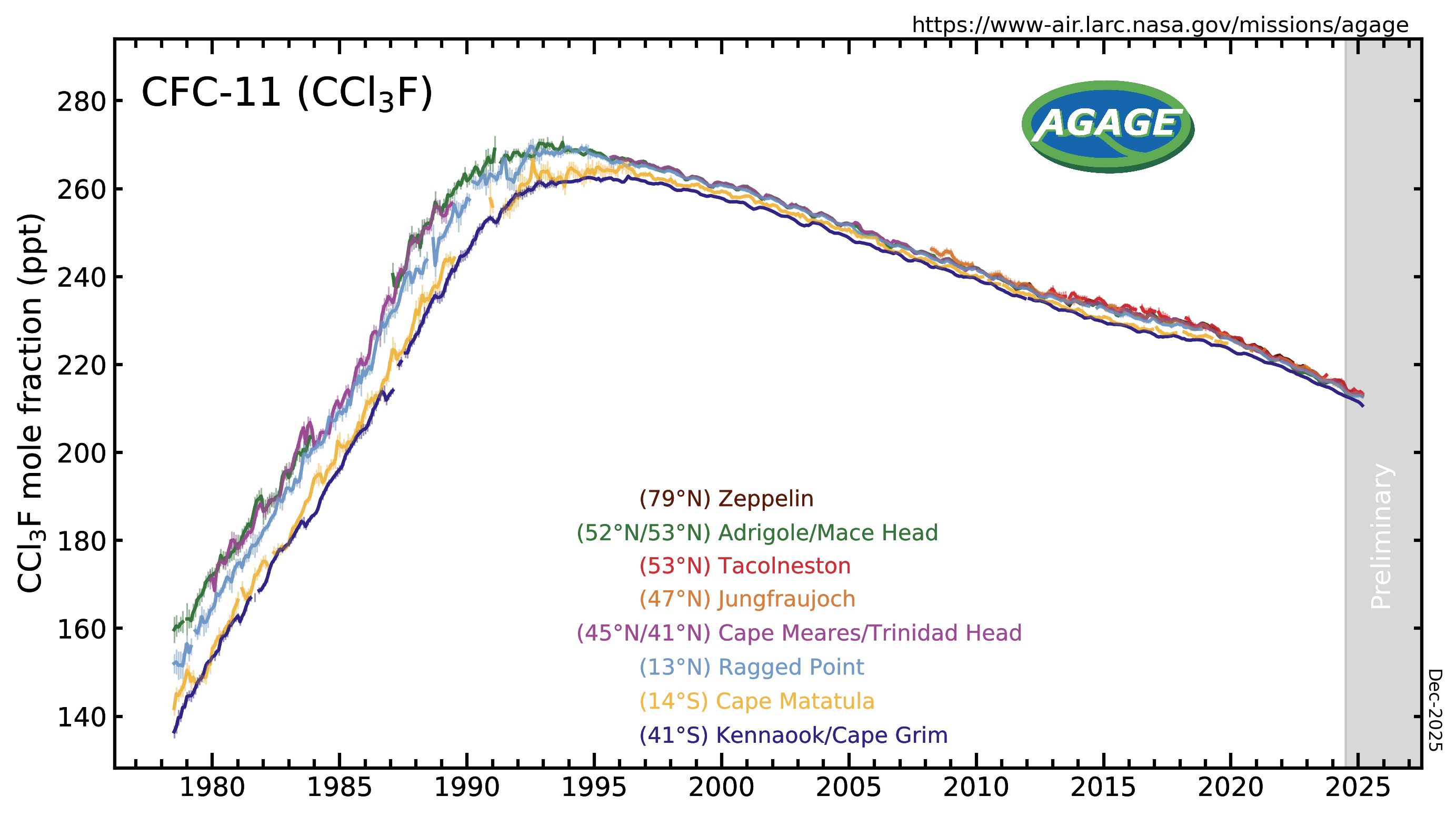
CFC-11 measured by the Advanced Global Atmospheric Gases Experiment (AGAGE) in the lower atmosphere (troposphere) at stations around the world. Abundances are given as pollution free monthly mean mole fractions in parts-per-trillion.

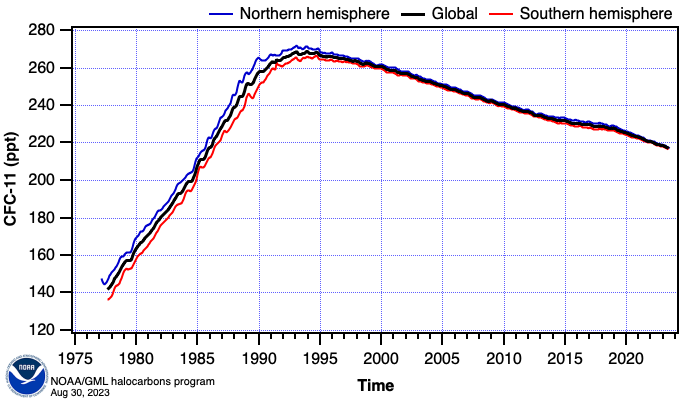
Hemispheric and Global mean concentrations of CFC-11 (NOAA/ESRL)

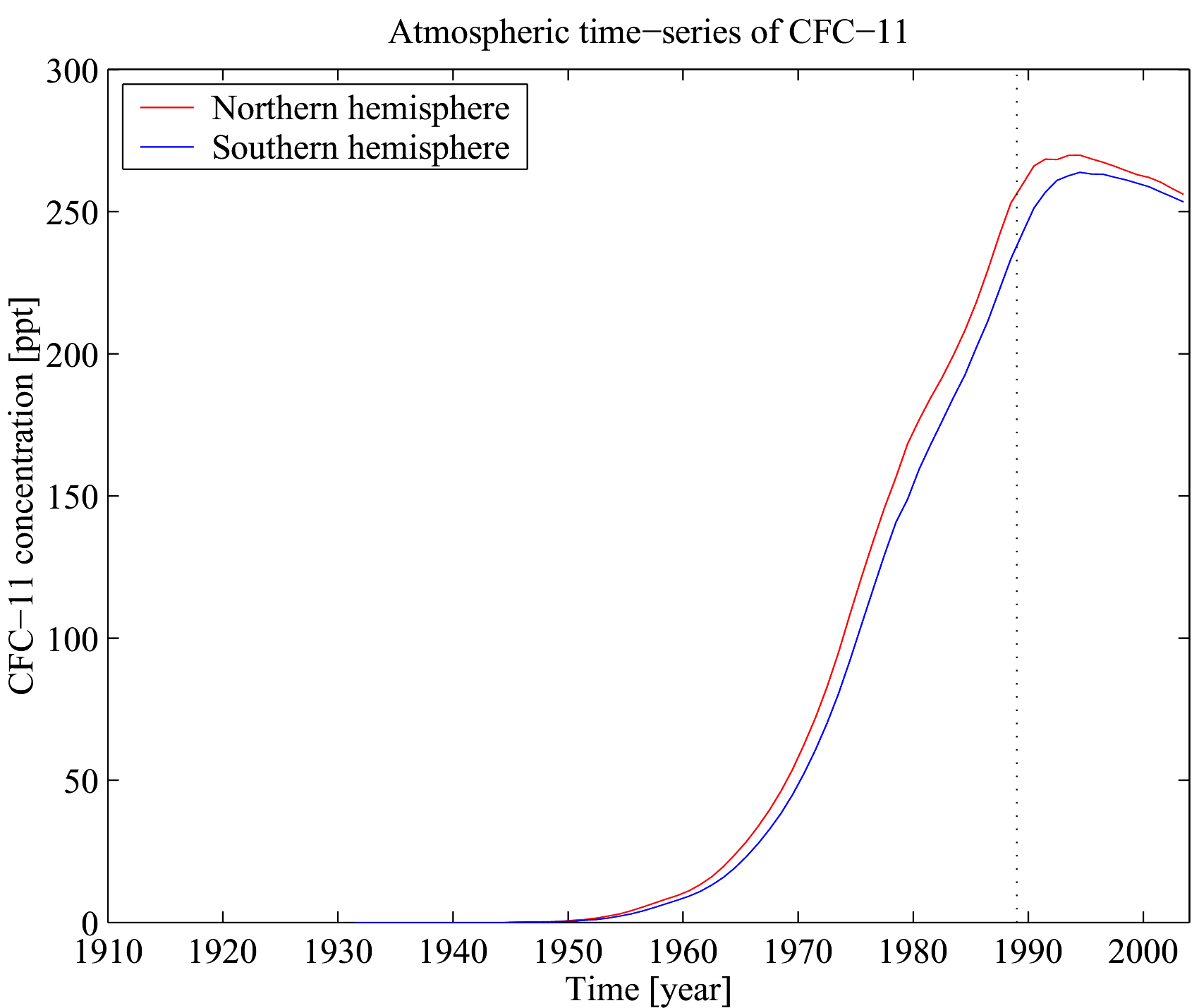
Time-series of atmospheric concentrations of CFC-11 (Walker et al., 2000)

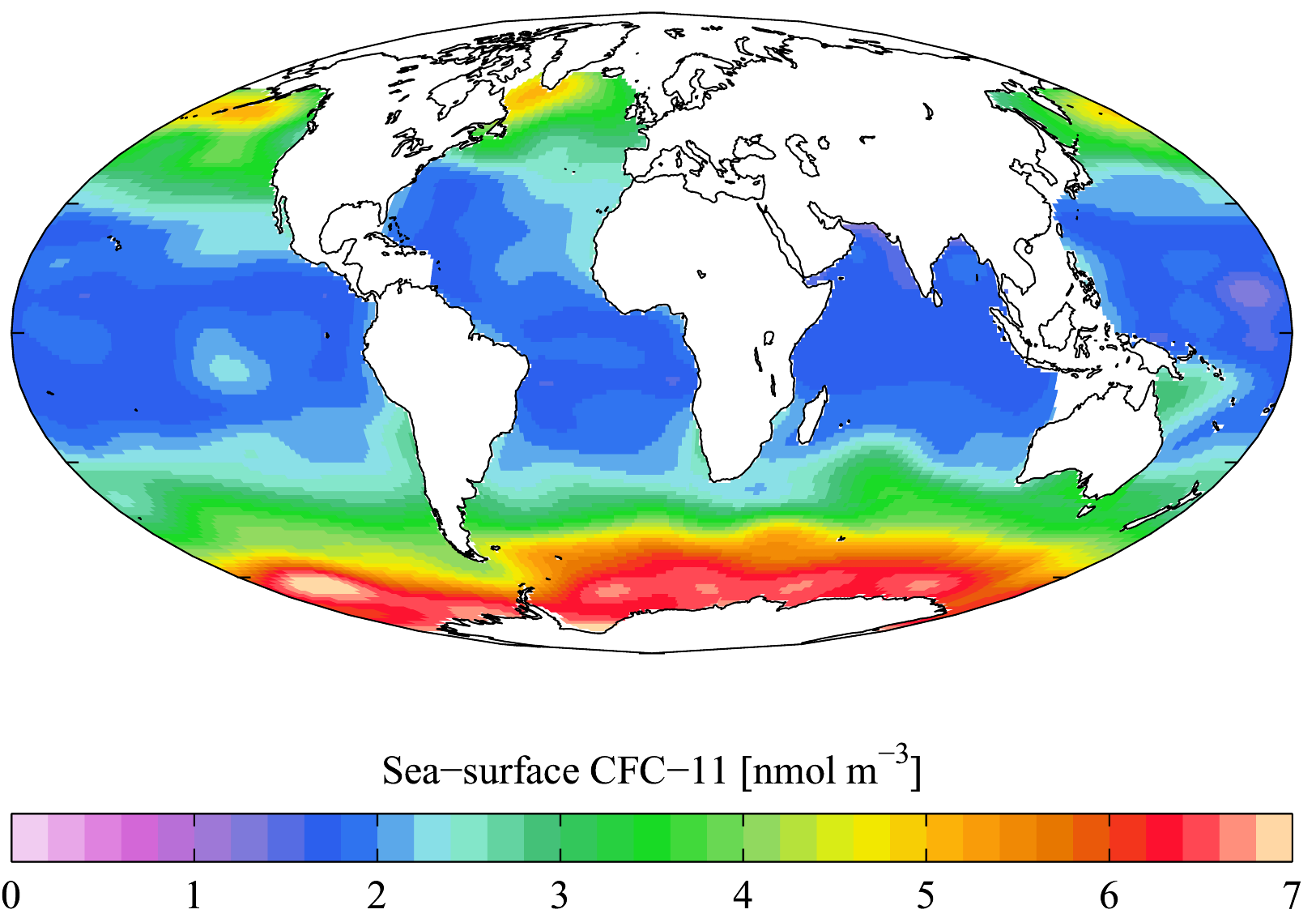
"Present day" (1990s) sea surface CFC-11 concentration

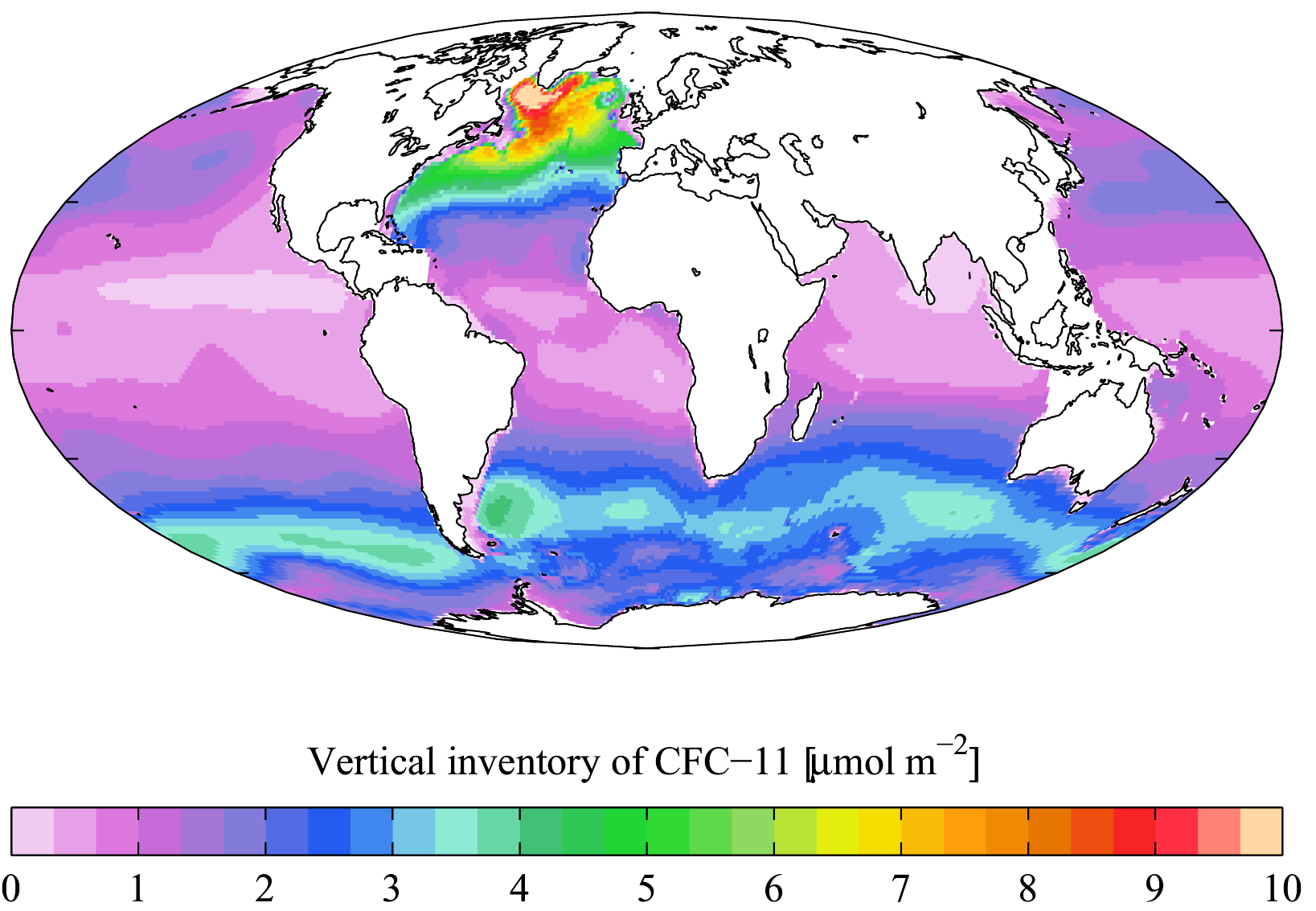
"Present day" (1990s) CFC-11 oceanic vertical inventory

== See also ==
- List of refrigerants
- IPCC list of greenhouse gases
- 1,1,2-Trichloro-1,2,2-trifluoroethane
