= 1,2-Dichlorotetrafluoroethane =

Chlorofluorocarbon

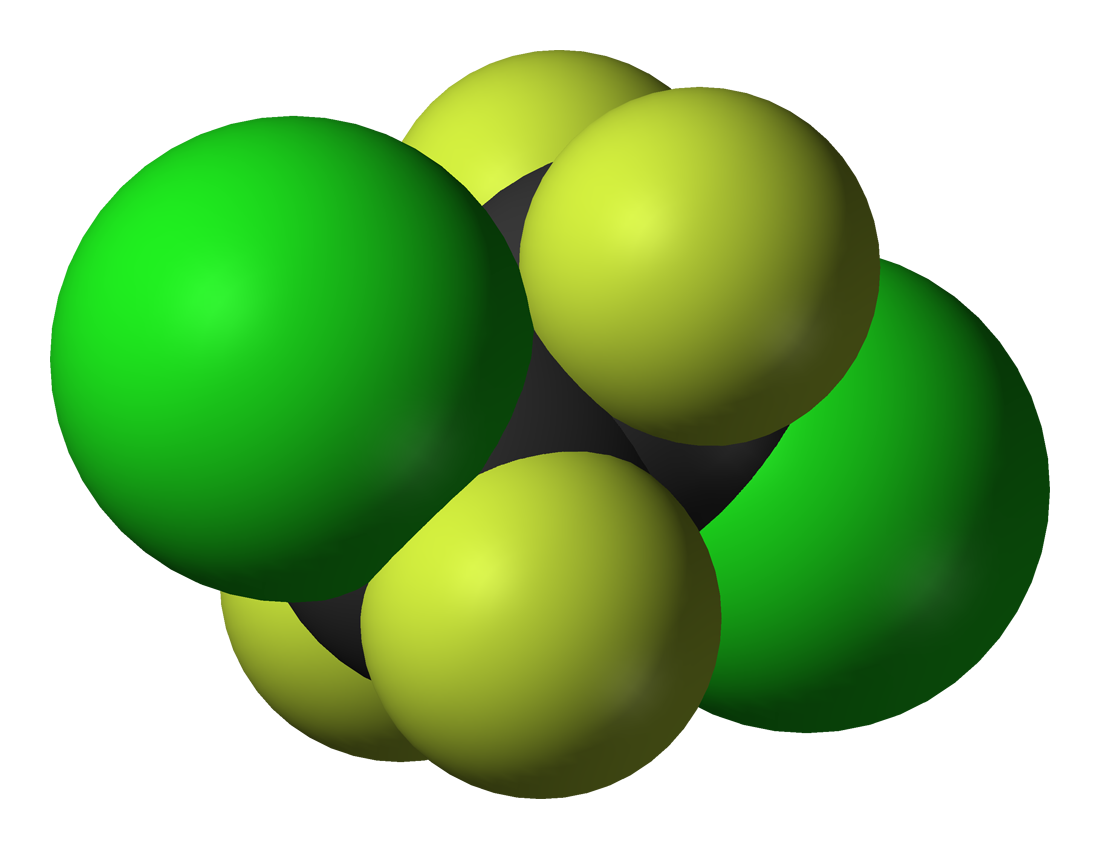

Names
- Preferred IUPAC name 1,2-Dichloro-1,1,2,2-tetrafluoroethane
- Other names R-114, CFC-114, halon 242, cryofluorane, Freon 114, Genetron 114, Refrigerant 114

Identifiers
| CAS Number | 76-14-2 |
| 3D model (JSmol) | Interactive image |
| ChEMBL | ChEMBL325436 |
| ChemSpider | 6189 |
| ECHA InfoCard | 100.000.853 |
| EC Number | 200-937-7 |
| PubChem CID | 6429 |
| RTECS number | KI1101000 |
| UNII | 6B5VVT93AR |
| UN number | 1958 |
| CompTox Dashboard (EPA) | DTXSID8026434 |
- InChI: InChI=1S/C2Cl2F4/c3-1(5,6)2(4,7)8 Key: DDMOUSALMHHKOS-UHFFFAOYSA-N
- SMILES: ClC(F)(F)C(F)(F)Cl

Properties
| Chemical formula | C_{2}Cl_{2}F_{4} |
| Molar mass | 170.92 g/mol |
| Appearance | colorless gas |
| Odor | faint, ether-like (high concentrations) |
| Density | 1.455 g/cm^{3} |
| Melting point | −94 °C (−137 °F; 179 K) |
| Boiling point | 3.5 °C (38.3 °F; 276.6 K) |
| Solubility in water | 0.01% |
| Vapor pressure | 1.9 atm (21°C) |

Hazards
- Occupational safety and health (OHS/OSH)
| Main hazards | Ozone depletor |
- GHS labelling
| Pictograms | (GHS07: Exclamation mark) |
| Signal word | Warning |
| Hazard statements | H420 |
| Precautionary statements | P410+P403, P502 |
| Flash point | nonflammable |
- Lethal dose or concentration (LD, LC)
| LC_{50} (median concentration) | 720,000 ppm (rat, 30 min); 700,000 ppm (mouse, 30 min); 750,000 ppm (rabbit, 30 min) |
- NIOSH (US health exposure limits)
| PEL (Permissible) | TWA 1000 ppm (7000 mg/m^{3}) |
| REL (Recommended) | TWA 1000 ppm (7000 mg/m^{3}) |
| IDLH (Immediate danger) | 15000 ppm |
- Except where otherwise noted, data are given for materials in their standard state (at 25 °C [77 °F], 100 kPa). verify (what is ?) Infobox references

1,2-Dichlorotetrafluoroethane, or R-114, also known as cryofluorane (INN), is a chlorofluorocarbon (CFC) with the molecular formula ClF_{2}CCF_{2}Cl. Its primary use has been as a refrigerant. It is a non-flammable gas with a sweetish, chloroform-like odor with the critical point occurring at 145.6 °C and 3.26 MPa. When pressurized or cooled, it is a colorless liquid. It is listed on the Intergovernmental Panel on Climate Change's list of ozone depleting chemicals, and is classified as a Montreal Protocol Class I, group 1 ozone depleting substance.

== Uses ==
When used as a refrigerant, R-114 is classified as a medium pressure refrigerant.

The U.S. Navy uses R-114 in its centrifugal chillers in preference to R-11 to avoid air and moisture leakage into the system. While the evaporator of an R-11 charged chiller runs at a vacuum during operation, R-114 yields approximately 0 psig operating pressure in the evaporator.

Manufactured and sold R-114 was usually mixed with the non symmetrical isomer 1,1-dichlorotetrafluoroethane (CFC-114a), as separation of the two isomers is difficult.

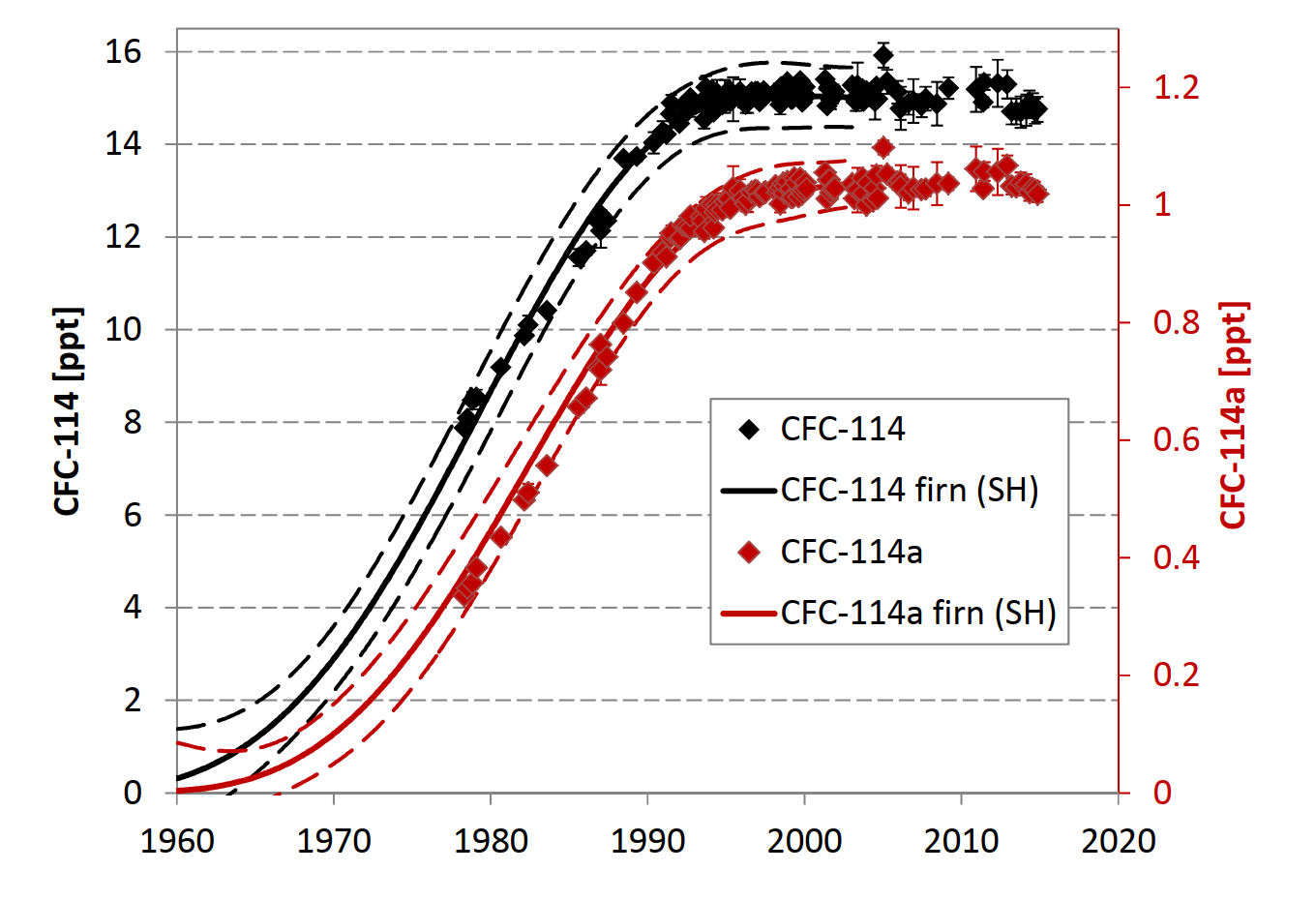
Mixing ratio of CFC-114 in air (black) between 1960 and 2014. Also levels of CFC-114a are in red.

== Dangers ==
Aside from its immense environmental impacts, R114, like most chlorofluoroalkanes, forms phosgene gas when exposed to a naked flame.
