= Bromofluorocarbon =

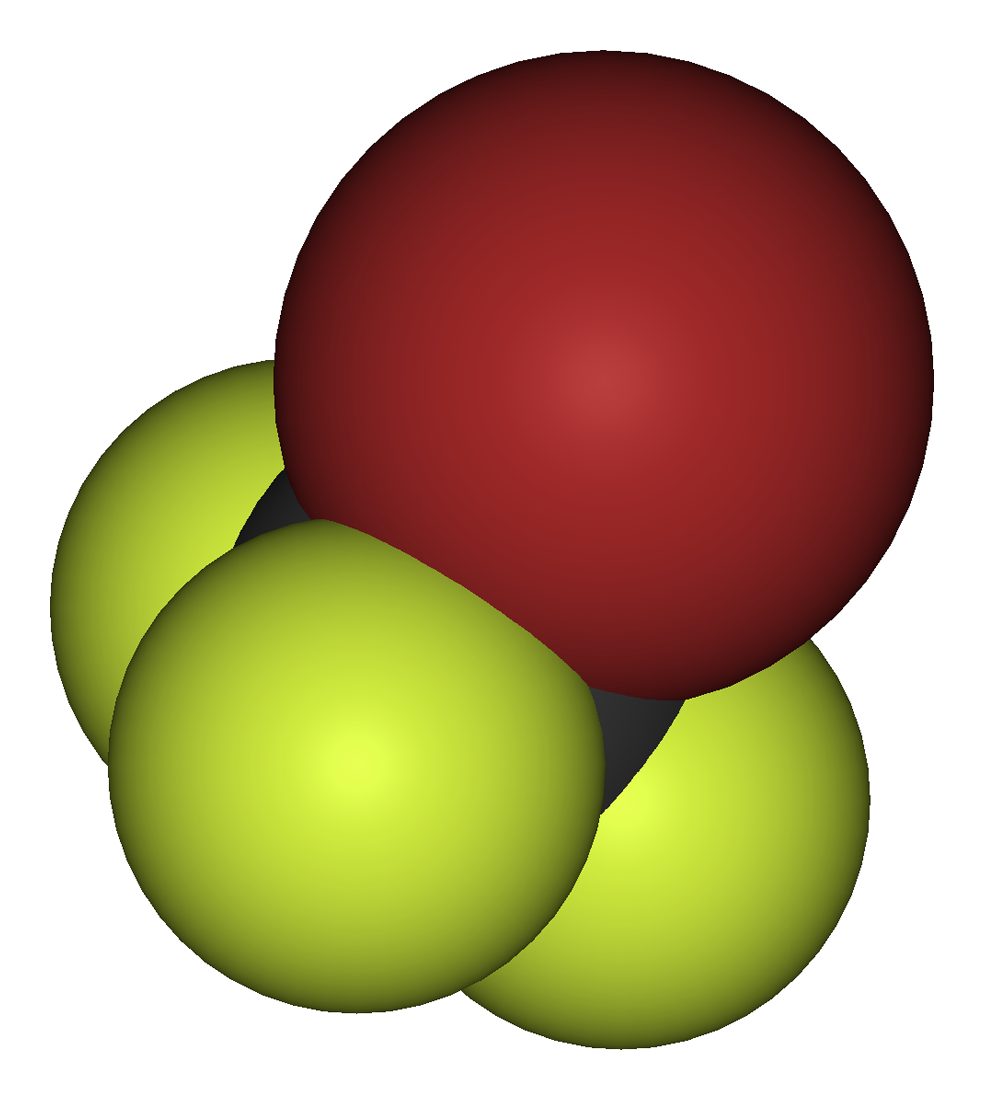
Bromotrifluoromethane

Bromofluorocarbons (BFCs) are molecules based on carbon, bromine, and fluorine. The most common use has traditionally been in fire suppression systems. The brand name "Halon" is frequently used interchangeably for BFCs. However, not all Halons are technically BFCs (some contain chlorine also).

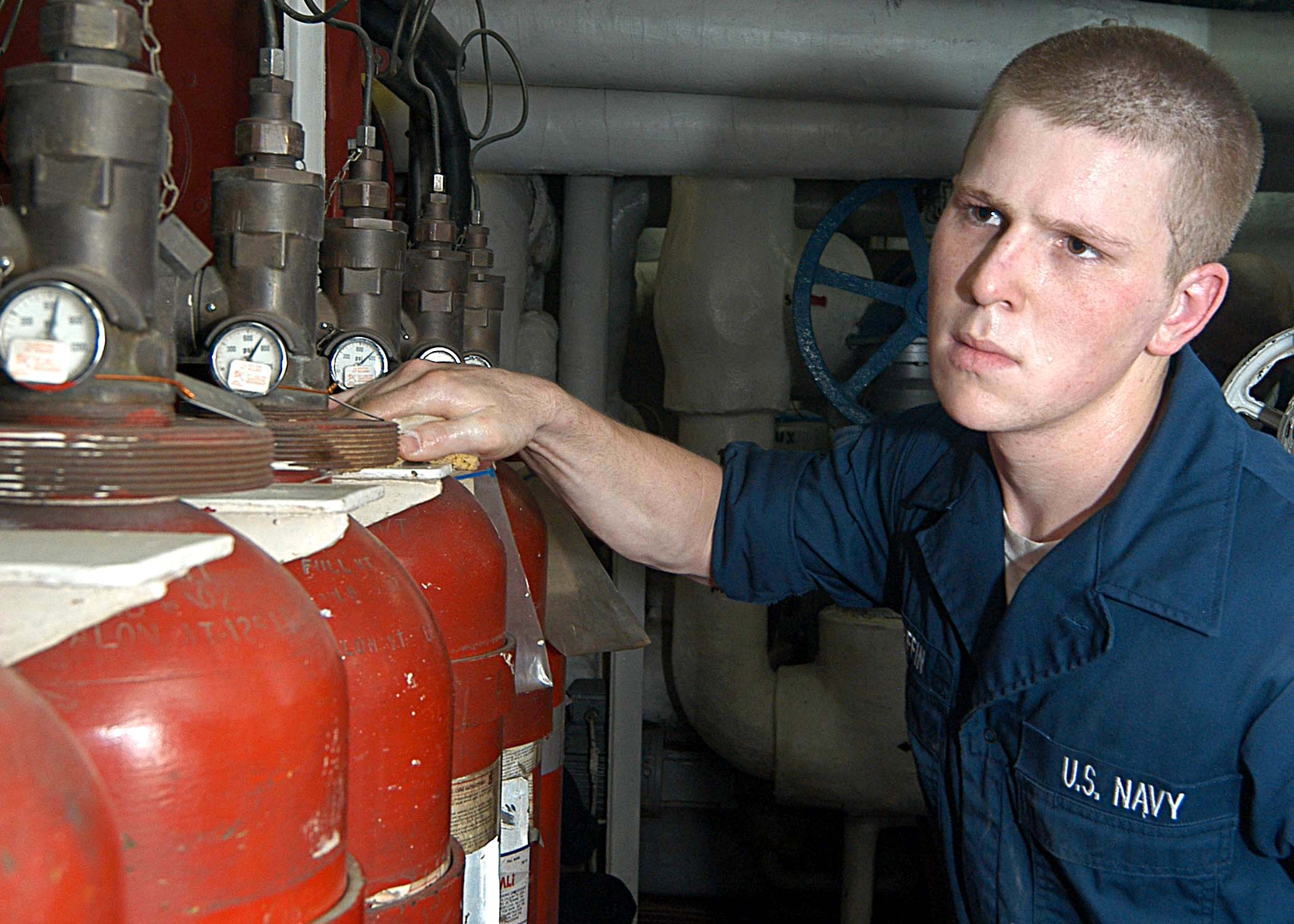
A Halon fire suppression system in a U.S. Navy ship's machinery room

BFCs attack the ozone layer even more aggressively than chlorofluorocarbons (CFCs), and are powerful greenhouse gases, although due to shorter atmospheric lifetimes not as powerful as equivalent perfluorocarbons or chlorofluorocarbons. Nevertheless, BFCs are still used in some ships and aircraft, because replacements are not as effective. As production of BFCs was banned by the Montreal Protocol, remaining use depends on old inventories and on recycling.

BFCs are extremely inert. In a fire, in addition to physically excluding oxygen, the molecules liberate bromine radicals which interfere with combustion reactions. BFCs tend to have higher melting and boiling points than comparable fully fluorinated molecules.
