= 1,1,1-Trichloro-2,2,2-trifluoroethane =

Organic molecule of anthropogenic origin implicated in ozone depletion

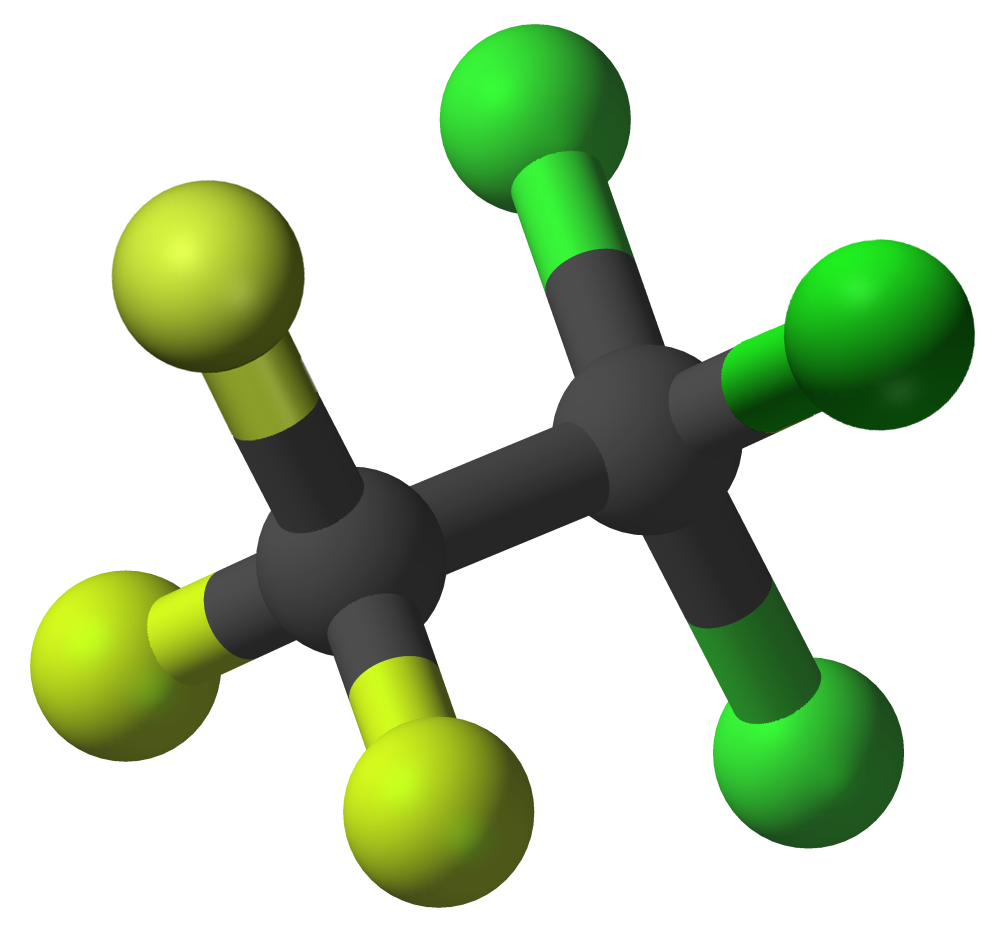

Names
- Preferred IUPAC name 1,1,1-Trichloro-2,2,2-trifluoroethane
- Other names CFC-113a; Freon 113a Arcton 63; Freon-FT; 1,1,1-Trichloro-2,2,2-trifluoroethane; 1,1,1-Trichlorotrifluoroethane; 1,1,1-Trifluoro-2,2,2-trichloroethane; 1,1,1-Trifluorotrichloroethane; FC 113; FC133a; Precision cleaning agent TF; T-WD602; Unsymmetrical Trichlorotrifluoroethane; FC 113a 2,2,2-Trichloro-1,1,1-trifluoroethane

Identifiers
CAS Number	354-58-5
3D model (JSmol)	Interactive image
ChemSpider	9258
ECHA InfoCard	100.005.968
EC Number	206-564-6
PubChem CID	9635
UNII	07H0R79HO0
CompTox Dashboard (EPA)	DTXSID5027148
- InChI: InChI=1S/C2Cl3F3/c3-1(4,5)2(6,7)8 Key: BOSAWIQFTJIYIS-UHFFFAOYSA-N
- SMILES: FC(F)(F)C(Cl)(Cl)Cl

Properties
Chemical formula	CCl_{3}CF_{3}
Molar mass	187.376 g/mol
Appearance	Colourless liquid
Density	1.579 g/mL
Melting point	13–14 °C (55–57 °F; 286–287 K)
Boiling point	46 °C (115 °F; 319 K)
- Except where otherwise noted, data are given for materials in their standard state (at 25 °C [77 °F], 100 kPa). Infobox references

1,1,1-Trichloro-2,2,2-trifluoroethane, also called Asymmetrical trichlorotrifluoroethane or CFC-113a, is a chlorofluorocarbon (CFC) with the formula CCl_{3}CF_{3}.

== Ozone depletion ==
A team of researchers at the University of East Anglia analysed unpolluted air samples from Tasmania dating from the period 1978 to 2012. They concluded that the CFCs they studied had started entering the atmosphere from anthropogenic sources in the 1960s and that while the abundance of certain CFCs had decreased, owing to the Montreal Protocol, the abundance of CFC-113a in the atmosphere was still growing. Its main source remained uncertain, but production of hydrofluorocarbons in East Asia was suspected. Between 2012 and 2017, concentrations of the gas jumped by 40 percent. In 2020, the global mean concentration of CFC-113a was 1.02 parts per trillion with global emissions of 2.5 ± 0.4 ODP-Gg yr^{−1}.

== See also ==
- 1,1,2-Trichloro-1,2,2-trifluoroethane
