= 1,1,2-Trichloro-1,2,2-trifluoroethane =

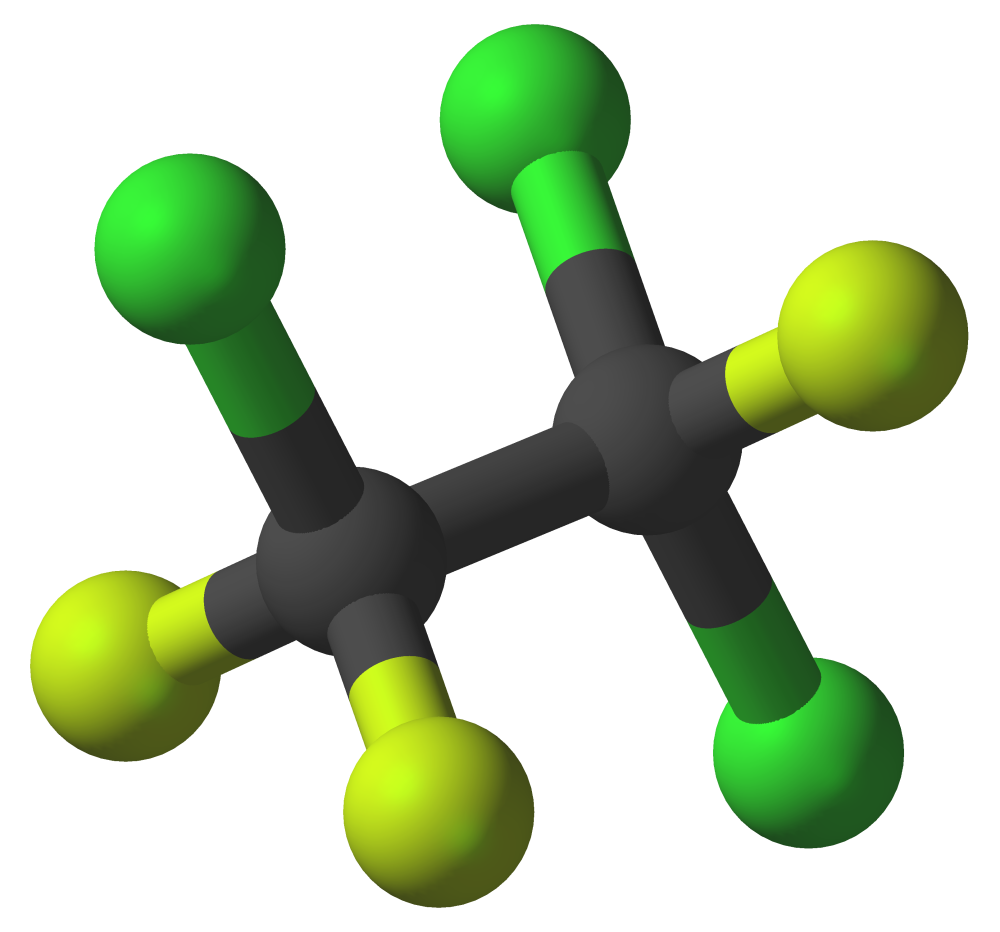

Names
- Preferred IUPAC name 1,1,2-Trichloro-1,2,2-trifluoroethane
- Other names Arklone P CFC-113; Freon 113; Frigen 113 TR; Freon TF; Valclene; 1,1,2-trichlorotrifluoroethane TCTFE; Solvent 113

Identifiers
CAS Number	76-13-1
3D model (JSmol)	Interactive image
ChEMBL	ChEMBL478511
ChemSpider	6188
ECHA InfoCard	100.000.852
PubChem CID	6428
UNII	0739N04X3A
CompTox Dashboard (EPA)	DTXSID6021377
- InChI: InChI=1S/C2Cl3F3/c3-1(4,6)2(5,7)8 Key: AJDIZQLSFPQPEY-UHFFFAOYSA-N; InChI=1/C2Cl3F3/c3-1(4,6)2(5,7)8 Key: AJDIZQLSFPQPEY-UHFFFAOYAE
- SMILES: ClC(F)(F)C(Cl)(Cl)F

Properties
Chemical formula	CClF_{2}CCl_{2}F
Molar mass	187.37 g·mol^{−1}
Appearance	Colorless liquid
Odor	like carbon tetrachloride
Density	1.56 g/mL
Melting point	−35 °C (−31 °F; 238 K)
Boiling point	47.7 °C (117.9 °F; 320.8 K)
Solubility in water	170 mg/L
Vapor pressure	285 mmHg (20 °C)
Thermal conductivity	0.0729 W m^{−1} K^{−1} (300 K)

Hazards
- Lethal dose or concentration (LD, LC)
LC_{Lo} (lowest published)	250,000 ppm (mouse, 1.5 hr); 87,000 (rat, 6 hr)
- NIOSH (US health exposure limits)
PEL (Permissible)	TWA 1000 ppm (7600 mg/m^{3})
REL (Recommended)	TWA 1000 ppm (7600 mg/m^{3}) ST 1250 ppm (9500 mg/m^{3})
IDLH (Immediate danger)	2000 ppm

Hazards
- GHS labelling
Pictograms	(GHS07: Exclamation mark) (GHS09: Environmental hazard)
Signal word	Warning
NFPA 704 (fire diamond)	3 0 1
Safety data sheet (SDS)	https://datasheets.scbt.com/sc-251541.pdf
- Except where otherwise noted, data are given for materials in their standard state (at 25 °C [77 °F], 100 kPa). verify (what is ?) Infobox references

1,1,2-Trichloro-1,2,2-trifluoroethane, also called simply trichlorotrifluoroethane (often abbreviated as TCTFE) or CFC-113, is a chlorofluorocarbon. It has the formula Cl_{2}FC−CClF_{2}. This colorless, volatile liquid was a versatile solvent used in various precision cleaning operations until it was phased out due its impact on the ozone layer.

== Production ==
CFC-113 can be prepared from hexachloroethane and hydrofluoric acid:

C_{2}Cl_{6} + 3 HF → CF_{2}Cl−CFCl_{2} + 3 HCl

This reaction may require catalysts such as antimony, chromium, iron and alumina at high temperatures.

Another synthesis method uses HF on tetrachloroethylene instead. Industrial production of CFC-113 began in the early 1940s.

== Uses ==
CFC-113 was one of the three most popular CFCs, along with CFC-11 and CFC-12. In 1989, an estimated 250,000 tons were produced. It has been used as a cleaning agent for electrical and electronic components. CFC-113’s low flammability and low toxicity made it ideal for use as a cleaner for delicate electrical-electronic equipment such as printed circuit boards, fabrics, and metals. It would not harm the product it was cleaning, ignite with a spark or react with other chemicals.

It was used as a dry-cleaning solvent, as an alternative to perchloroethylene, introduced by DuPont in March 1961 as "Valclene" (former designated trade name was "Fasclene" but it was later changed to Valclene in the same year for legal reasons) and was also marketed as the "solvent of the future" by Imperial Chemical Industries in the 1970s under the tradename "Arklone". Others from this series were Perklone (Tetrachloroethylene), Triklone (Trichloroethylene), Methoklone (Dichloromethane) and Genklene (1,1,1-Trichloroethane). Its use in dry-cleaning peaked around 1971, and dry-cleaners using CFC-113 were known as Valclenerías in Spanish. In 1986, 489 dry-cleaning facilities (about 2.2% of 21,787 dry-cleaning facilities) in the US were using CFC-113 as their main solvent. It was seen as the perfect dry-cleaning solvent until its environmental effects were discovered.

CFC-113 in laboratory analytics and industry has been replaced by other solvents.

Reduction of CFC-113 with zinc gives chlorotrifluoroethylene:

CFCl_{2}−CClF_{2} + Zn → CClF=CF_{2} + ZnCl_{2}

== Hazards ==
When inhaled in large concentrations, trichlorotrifluoroethane can cause loss of consciousness.

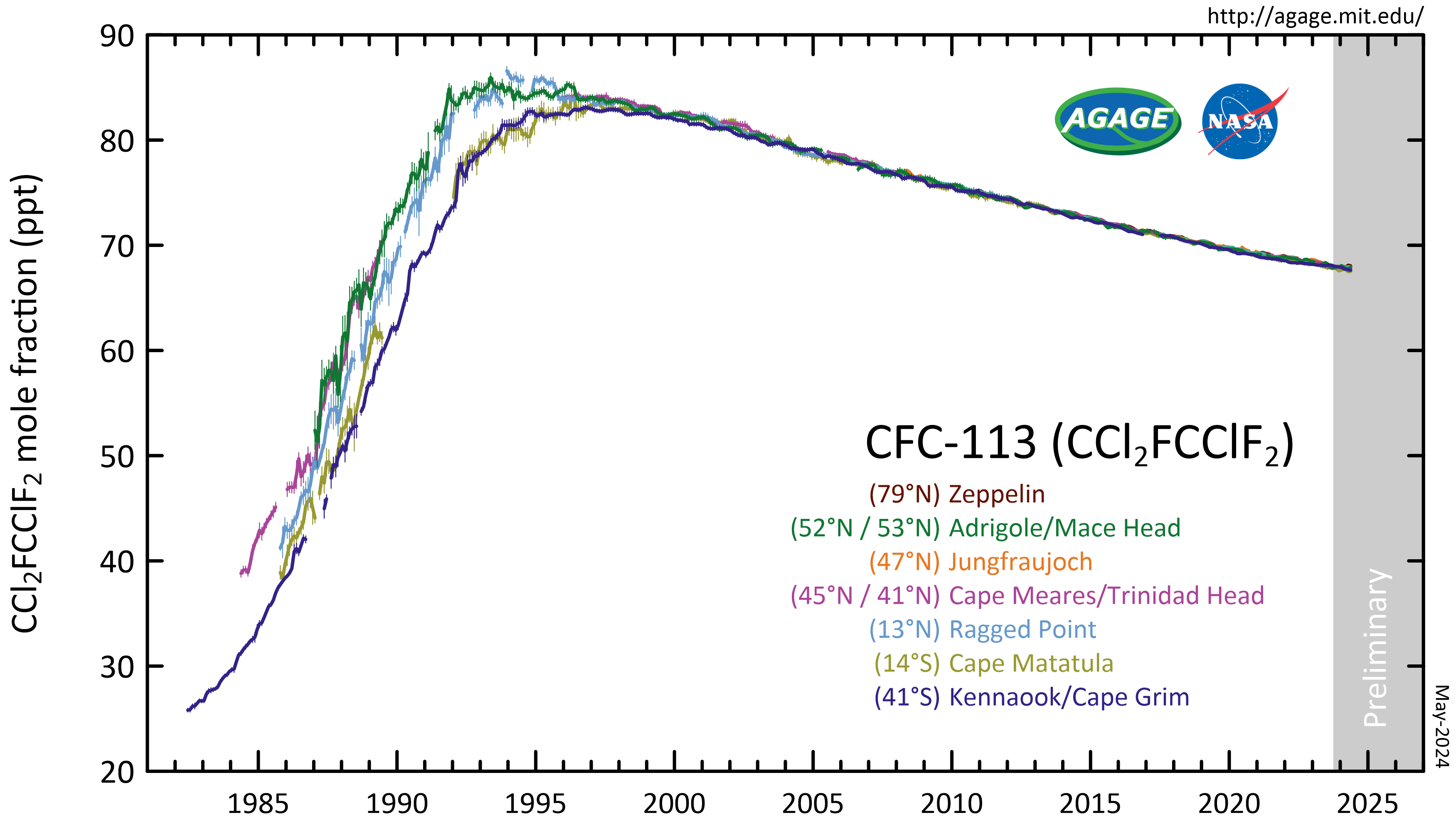
CFC-113 measured by the Advanced Global Atmospheric Gases Experiment (AGAGE) in the lower atmosphere (troposphere) at stations around the world. Abundances are given as pollution free monthly mean mole fractions in parts-per-trillion.

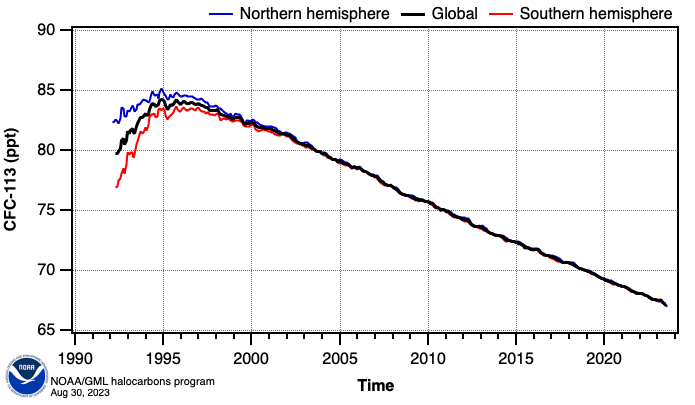
Atmospheric concentration of CFC-113 since year 1992.

CFC-113 is a very unreactive chlorofluorocarbon. It may remain in the atmosphere up to 90 years, sufficiently long that it will cycle out of the troposphere and into the stratosphere. In the stratosphere, CFC-113 can be broken up by ultraviolet radiation (UV, sunlight in the 190-225 nm range), generating chlorine radicals (Cl•), which initiate degradation of ozone requiring only a few minutes:

CClF_{2}CCl_{2}F → C_{2}F_{3}Cl_{2} + Cl•
Cl• + O_{3} → ClO• + O_{2}

This reaction is followed by:

ClO• + O → Cl• + O_{2}

The process regenerates Cl• to destroy more O_{3}. The Cl• will destroy an average of 100,000 O_{3} molecules during its atmospheric lifetime of 1–2 years.

Aside from its immense environmental impacts, trichlorotrifluoroethane, like most chlorofluoroalkanes, forms phosgene gas when exposed to a naked flame.

== See also ==
- 1,1,1-Trichloro-2,2,2-trifluoroethane
