= Nonafluoro-tert-butyl alcohol =

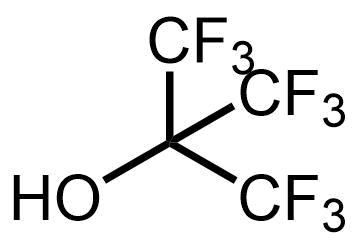
- Nonafluoro-tert-butyl alcohol

Names
- Preferred IUPAC name 1,1,1,3,3,3-Hexafluoro-2-(trifluoromethyl)propan-2-ol
- Other names perfluoro-tert-butyl alcohol, perfluoro-tert-butanol

Identifiers
CAS Number	2378-02-1
3D model (JSmol)	Interactive image
ChemSpider	16035
ECHA InfoCard	100.017.417
EC Number	219-157-3
PubChem CID	16924
CompTox Dashboard (EPA)	DTXSID5073292
- InChI: InChI=1S/C4HF9O/c5-2(6,7)1(14,3(8,9)10)4(11,12)13/h14H
- SMILES: OC(C(F)(F)F)(C(F)(F)F)C(F)(F)F

Properties
Chemical formula	C_{4}F_{9}OH
Molar mass	236.04 g/mol
Appearance	Colorless liquid
Boiling point	45 °C (113 °F; 318 K)
Solubility in water	Miscible
Acidity (pK_{a})	5.4 (in H_{2}O)

Hazards
- Occupational safety and health (OHS/OSH)
Main hazards	Corrosive, eye irritant
- Except where otherwise noted, data are given for materials in their standard state (at 25 °C [77 °F], 100 kPa). verify (what is ?) Infobox references

Nonafluoro-tert-butyl alcohol (IUPAC name: 1,1,1,3,3,3-hexafluoro-2-(trifluoromethyl)propan-2-ol) is a fluoroalcohol. It is the perfluorinated analog of tert-butyl alcohol. Notably, as a consequence of its electron withdrawing fluorine substituents, it is very acidic for an alcohol, with a pK_{a} value of 5.4, similar to that of a carboxylic acid. As another consequence of being a perfluorinated compound, it is also one of the lowest boiling alcohols, with a boiling point lower than that of methanol.

== Synthesis ==
It is prepared by addition of trichloromethyllithium to hexafluoroacetone, followed by halogen exchange with antimony pentafluoride. The aluminate derived from its alkoxide anion, tetrakis[1,1,1,3,3,3-hexafluoro-2-(trifluoromethyl)propan-2-oxy]aluminate(1–), [((CF_{3})_{3}CO)_{4}Al]^{−} is used as a weakly coordinating anion.

== See also ==
- 2,2,2-Trifluoroethanol
- 1,1,1,3,3,3-Hexafluoro-2-propanol
- Hexafluoroacetone
- Perfluorotriethylcarbinol
