= Fluoroalcohol =

Class of chemical compounds

Fluoroalcohols are organofluorine compounds consisting of an alcohol functional group with at least one C-F bond. These compounds often have distinctive solvent properties.

== Perfluoroalcohols ==
Most primary and secondary perfluoroalcohols are unstable, for example trifluoromethanol eliminates hydrogen fluoride, forming carbonyl fluoride. This reaction is reversible.

CF_{3}OH → COF_{2} + HF

Stable perfluorinated alcohols include nonafluoro-tert-butyl alcohol ((CF_{3})_{3}COH) and pentafluorophenol (C_{6}F_{5}OH).

== Partially fluorinated alcohols ==
Numerous partially fluorinated alcohols are known and have useable stabilities. Trifluoroethanol and hexafluoroisopropanol are used as solvents in research. Fluorotelomer alcohols are precursors to perfluorocarboxylic acids. Pirkle's alcohol is used a chiral shift reagent in nuclear magnetic resonance spectroscopy.
