= Carbon oxohalide =

Group of chemical compounds

Carbon oxohalides are a group of chemical compounds that contain only carbon, oxygen and halogen atoms: fluorine, chlorine, bromine and iodine. They include carbonyl halides, COX_{2}, and oxalyl halides, C_{2}X_{2}O_{2}, where X = F, Cl, Br or I. The halogen atoms X do not have to be identical; they differ in mixed oxohalides. Most combinations of halogens exist but carbonyl iodide, COI_{2}, is unknown. The carbon–oxygen bond length in carbonyl halides (1.13–1.17 Å) is shorter than in other carbonyl compounds such as aldehydes and ketones, carboxylic acids, esters and amides (1.20–1.21 Å). They are reactive reagents for halogenation, acylation and dehydration reactions.

Carbon oxohalides
Name	Formula	Melting point / °C	Boiling point / °C	C–O bond length / Å
Carbonyl fluoride	COF_{2}	−114	−83.1	1.174
Carbonyl chloride fluoride	COFCl		−42	
Carbonyl bromide fluoride	COFBr		−20.6	
Phosgene	COCl_{2}	−127.8	+7.6	1.166
Carbonyl fluoride iodide	COFI	−90	+23.4	
Carbonyl bromide chloride	COClBr			
Carbonyl bromide	COBr_{2}		+64.5	1.13
Oxalyl fluoride	C_{2}F_{2}O_{2}	−3	+26.6	
Oxalyl chloride	C_{2}Cl_{2}O_{2}	−16	+63	
Diphosgene	C_{2}Cl_{4}O_{2}	−57	+128	
Triphosgene	C_{3}Cl_{6}O_{3}	+80	+206	

== See also ==
- Oxohalide
- Carbon compounds#Carbon halides
- Carbon compounds#Carbon-oxygen compounds
- Oxocarbon
