= Perfluoroisobutene =

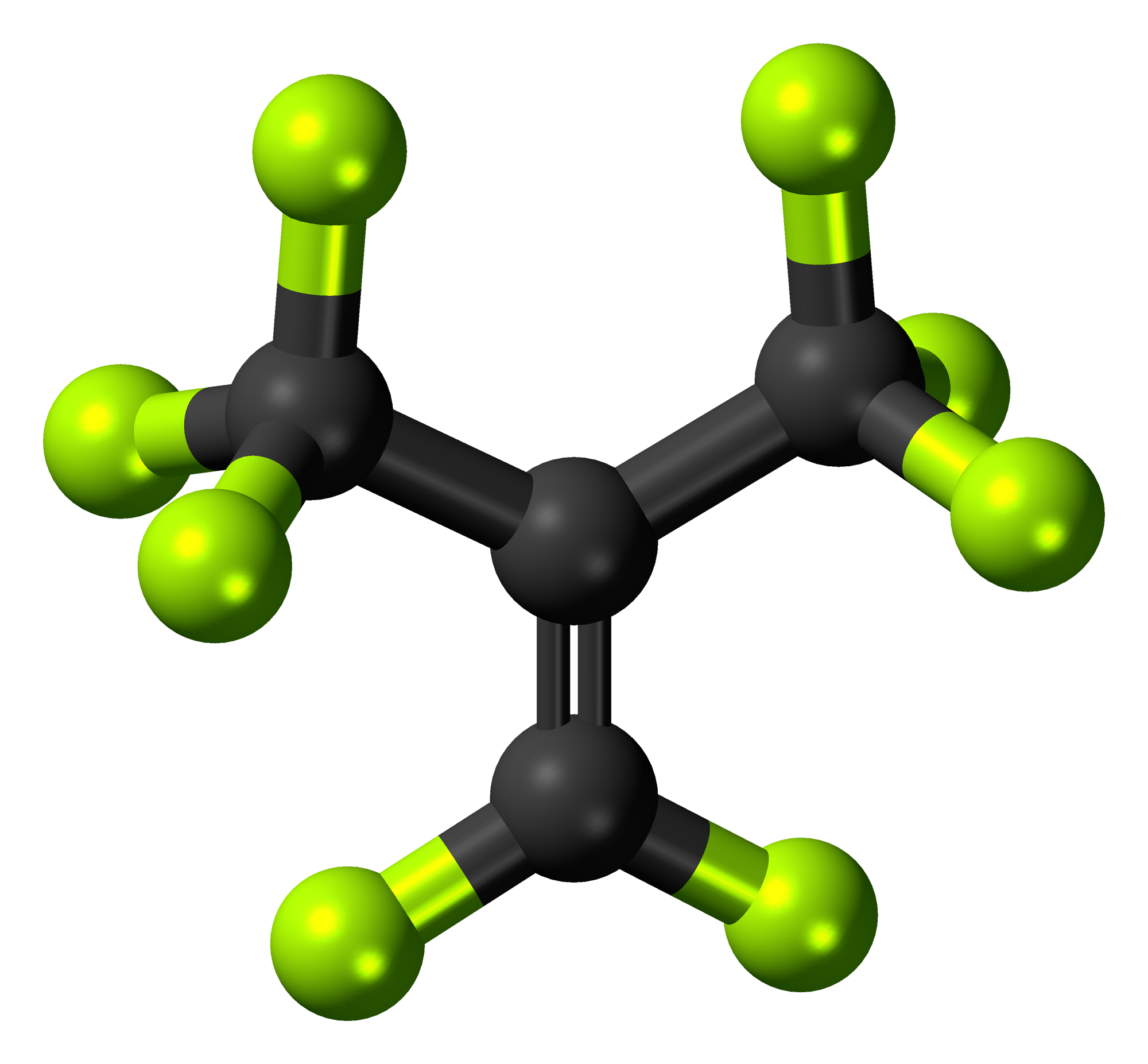

Names
- Preferred IUPAC name 1,1,3,3,3-Pentafluoro-2-(trifluoromethyl)prop-1-ene
- Other names Perfluoroisobutene, Perfluoroisobutylene, Octafluoroisobutylene, Octafluoro-sec-butene, PFIB

Identifiers
CAS Number	382-21-8
3D model (JSmol)	Interactive image
ChEMBL	ChEMBL4634291
ChemSpider	55060
ECHA InfoCard	100.108.743
EC Number	609-533-9
PubChem CID	61109
RTECS number	UD1800000
UNII	1J9BGS6NTY
CompTox Dashboard (EPA)	DTXSID4073176
- InChI: InChI=1S/C4F8/c5-2(6)1(3(7,8)9)4(10,11)12 Key: DAFIBNSJXIGBQB-UHFFFAOYSA-N; InChI=1/C4F8/c5-2(6)1(3(7,8)9)4(10,11)12 Key: DAFIBNSJXIGBQB-UHFFFAOYAF
- SMILES: FC(F)=C(C(F)(F)F)C(F)(F)F

Properties
Chemical formula	C_{4}F_{8}
Molar mass	200.030 g/mol
Appearance	colorless gas
Density	8.2 g/l
Melting point	−130 °C (−202 °F; 143 K)
Boiling point	7.0 °C (44.6 °F; 280.1 K)

Hazards
- GHS labelling
Pictograms	(GHS06: Toxic) (GHS08: Health hazard)
Signal word	Danger
Hazard statements	H330, H370
Precautionary statements	P260, P264, P270, P271, P284, P304+P340, P307+P311, P310, P320, P321, P403+P233, P405, P501
- Except where otherwise noted, data are given for materials in their standard state (at 25 °C [77 °F], 100 kPa). verify (what is ?) Infobox references

Perfluoroisobutene (PFIB) is the perfluorocarbon with the formula (CF_{3})_{2}C=CF_{2}. Classified as a perfluoroalkene, it is the fluorinated counterpart of the hydrocarbon isobutene. This colorless gas is notable for its high toxicity.

== Production and reactions ==
PFIB is one product of pyrolysis of polytetrafluoroethylene (PTFE). Tetrafluoroethylene thermally dimerizes to octafluorocyclobutane, which above 600 °C degrades to hexafluoropropylene and PFIB.

Perfluoroisobutene is highly reactive toward nucleophiles, e.g. methanol. It also forms addition compounds with thiols, and it is this reactivity that may be related to its toxicity. It hydrolyzes readily to give the relatively innocuous (CF_{3})_{2}CHCO_{2}H, which readily decarboxylates to give hexafluoropropane.

Oxidation of HFIB with potassium permanganate gives hexafluoroacetone.

== Safety ==
Perfluoroisobutene is highly toxic with an LCt = 880 mg⋅min⋅m^{−3} (mice). It is a Schedule 2 substance of the Chemical Weapons Convention. Its toxicity is comparable to that of phosgene.
