= Hexafluorothioacetone =

Names
- Preferred IUPAC name 1,1,1,3,3,3-Hexafluoropropane-2-thione
- Other names Perfluorothioacetone

Identifiers
CAS Number	1490-33-1
3D model (JSmol)	Interactive image
ChemSpider	499753
PubChem CID	574767
- InChI: InChI=1S/C3F6S/c4-2(5,6)1(10)3(7,8)9 Key: DBNMHLDZMPEZCX-UHFFFAOYSA-N
- SMILES: FC(F)(F)C(=S)C(F)(F)F

Properties
Chemical formula	C_{3}F_{6}S
Molar mass	182.08 g·mol^{−1}
Appearance	blue gas
Boiling point	8 °C (46 °F; 281 K)
- Except where otherwise noted, data are given for materials in their standard state (at 25 °C [77 °F], 100 kPa). Infobox references

Hexafluorothioacetone is an organic perfluoro thione compound with formula CF_{3}CSCF_{3}. At standard conditions it is a blue gas.

== Production ==
Hexafluorothioacetone was first produced by Middleton in 1961 by boiling bis-(perfluoroisopropyl)mercury with sulfur.

== Properties ==
Hexafluorothioacetone boils at 8 °C. Below this it is a blue liquid.

=== Colour ===
The blue colour is due to absorption in the visible light range with bands at 800–675 nm and 725–400 nm. These bands are due to T_{1}–S_{0} and S_{1}–S_{0} transitions. There is also a strong absorption in ultraviolet around 230-190 nm.

== Reactions ==
Hexafluorothioacetone acts more like a true thiocarbonyl (C=S) than many other thiocarbonyl compounds, because it is not able to form thioenol compounds (=C-S-H), and the sulfur is not in a negative ionized state (C-S^{−}). Hexafluorothioacetone is not attacked by water or oxygen at standard conditions as are many other thiocarbonyls.

Bases trigger the formation of a dimer 2,2,4,4-tetrakis-(trifluoromethyl)-1,3-dithietane. Bases includes amines.

The dimer can be heated to regenerate the hexafluorothioacetone monomer.

The dimer is also produced in a reaction with hexafluoropropene and sulfur with some potassium fluoride.

Hexafluorothioacetone reacts with bisulfite to form a Bunte salt CH(CF_{3})_{2}SSO_{2}^{−}.

Thiols reacting with hexafluorothioacetone yield disulfides or a dithiohemiketal:

R-SH + C(CF_{3})_{2}S → R-S-S-CH(CF_{3})_{2}.

R-SH + C(CF_{3})_{2}S → RSC(CF_{3})_{2}SH (for example in methanethiol or ethanethiol).

With mercaptoacetic acid, instead of a thiohemiketal, water elimination yields a ring shaped molecule called a dithiolanone -CH_{2}C(O)SC(CF_{3})_{2}S- (2,2-di(trifluoromethyl)-1,3-dithiolan-4-one). Aqueous hydrogen chloride results in the formation of a dimeric disulfide CH(CF_{3})_{2}SSC(CF_{3})_{2}Cl. Hydrogen bromide with water yields the similar CH(CF_{3})_{2}SSC(CF_{3})_{2}Br. Dry hydrogen iodide does something different and reduces the sulfur making CH(CF_{3})_{2}SH. Wet hydrogen iodide only reduces to a disulfide CH(CF_{3})_{2}SSC(CF_{3})_{2}H. Strong organic acids add water to yield a disulfide compound CH(CF_{3})_{2}SSC(CF_{3})_{2}OH.

Chlorine and bromine add to hexafluorothioacetone to make CCl(CF_{3})_{2}SCl and CBr(CF_{3})_{2}SBr.

With diazomethane hexafluorothioacetone produces 2,2,5,5-tetrakis(trifluoromethyl)-l,3-dithiolane, another substituted dithiolane. Diphenyldiazoniethane reacts to form a three membered ring called a thiirane (di-2,2-trifluoromethyl-di-3,3-phenyl-thiirane)

Trialkylphosphites (P(OR)_{3}) react to make a trialkoxybis(trifluoromethyl)methylenephosphorane (RO)_{3}P=C(CF_{3})_{2} and a thiophosphate (RO)_{3}PS.

Hexafluorothioacetone can act as a ligand on nickel.

Hexafluorothioacetone is highly reactive to alkenes and dienes combining via addition reactions. With butadiene it reacts even as low as -78 °C to yield 2,2-bis-(trifluoromethyl)-3,6-dihydro-2H-l-thiapyran.

== See also ==
- Hexafluoroacetone
- Trifluoronitrosomethane
