= C3H2F6O =

The molecular formula C_{3}H_{2}F_{6}O (molar mass: 168.038 g/mol, exact mass: 168.0010 u) may refer to:

- Desflurane
- Hexafluoro-2-propanol (HFIP)
