= Hexafluoroisobutylene =

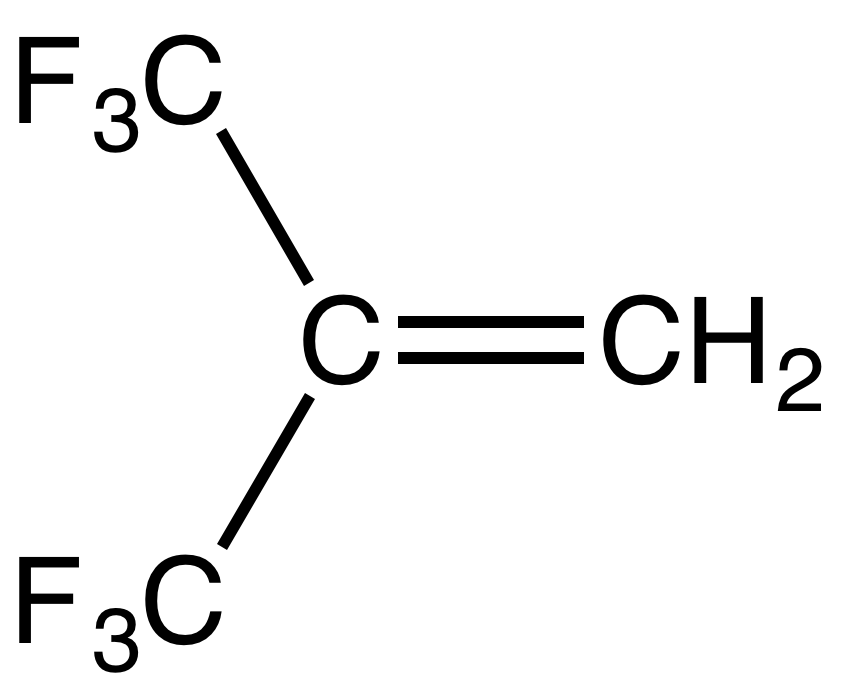

Names
- Preferred IUPAC name 3,3,3-Trifluoro-2-(trifluoromethyl)prop-1-ene
- Other names hexafluoroisobutene

Identifiers
CAS Number	382-10-5
3D model (JSmol)	Interactive image
ChemSpider	82578
ECHA InfoCard	100.006.219
EC Number	206-840-6
PubChem CID	91450
UNII	P9GQF23ZL8
CompTox Dashboard (EPA)	DTXSID9052056
- InChI: InChI=1S/C4H2F6/c1-2(3(5,6)7)4(8,9)10/h1H2 Key: QMIWYOZFFSLIAK-UHFFFAOYSA-N
- SMILES: C=C(C(F)(F)F)C(F)(F)F

Properties
Chemical formula	C_{4}H_{2}F_{6}
Molar mass	164.050 g·mol^{−1}
Appearance	colorless gas
Boiling point	14.1 °C (57.4 °F; 287.2 K)

Hazards
- GHS labelling
Pictograms	(GHS06: Toxic) (GHS08: Health hazard)
Signal word	Danger
Hazard statements	H331, H341, H372
Precautionary statements	P201, P202, P260, P264, P270, P271, P281, P304+P340, P308+P313, P311, P314, P321, P403+P233, P405, P410+P403, P501
- Except where otherwise noted, data are given for materials in their standard state (at 25 °C [77 °F], 100 kPa). Infobox references

Hexafluoroisobutylene is an organofluorine compound with the formula (CF_{3})_{2}C=CH_{2}. This colorless gas is structurally similar to isobutylene. It is used as a comonomer in the production of modified polyvinylidene fluoride. It is produced in a multistep process starting with the reaction of acetic anhydride with hexafluoroacetone. It is oxidized by sodium hypochlorite to hexafluoroisobutylene oxide. As expected, it is a potent dienophile.

== See also ==
- Perfluoroisobutene
