= TFAE =

TFAE may refer to:

- "The following are equivalent" in mathematical jargon
- 2,2,2-Trifluoroethanol, a synthetic organic compound
