= Trifluoromethanol =

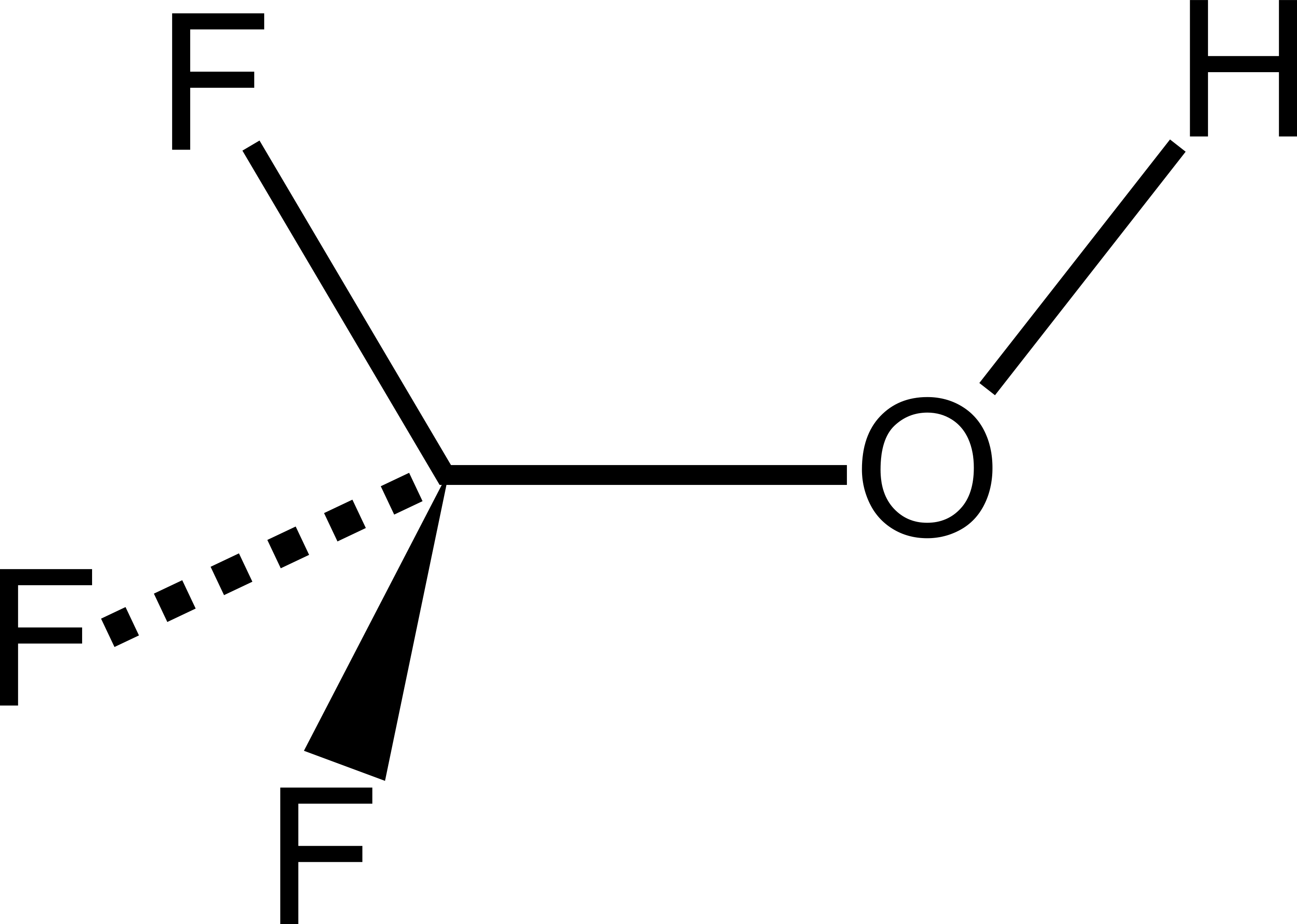

Names
- Preferred IUPAC name Trifluoromethanol
- Other names Trifluoromethyl alcohol, perfluoromethanol

Identifiers
CAS Number	1493-11-4
3D model (JSmol)	Interactive image
ChemSpider	66527
PubChem CID	73894
CompTox Dashboard (EPA)	DTXSID30896817 DTXSID00164217, DTXSID30896817
- InChI: InChI=1S/CHF3O/c2-1(3,4)5/h5H Key: WZCZNEGTXVXAAS-UHFFFAOYSA-N
- SMILES: C(O)(F)(F)F

Properties
Chemical formula	CF_{3}OH
Molar mass	86.013 g·mol^{−1}
Appearance	Colorless liquid
Density	1.5±0.1 g/cm^{3}
Melting point	−110.64 °C (−167.15 °F; 162.51 K)
Boiling point	22.4 °C (72.3 °F; 295.5 K) ±30.0°C

Hazards
Flash point	18.9 °C (66.0 °F; 292.0 K) ±15.6°
- Except where otherwise noted, data are given for materials in their standard state (at 25 °C [77 °F], 100 kPa). Infobox references

Trifluoromethanol is a synthetic organic compound with the formula CF_{3}OH. It is also referred to as perfluoromethanol or trifluoromethyl alcohol. The compound is the simplest perfluoroalcohol. The substance is a colorless gas, which is unstable at room temperature.

== Synthesis ==
Trifluoromethanol eliminates hydrogen fluoride in an endothermic reaction and forms carbonyl fluoride.

CF_{3}OH ⇌ COF_{2} + HF

The equilibrium can be shifted toward trifluoromethanol at lower temperatures. If the synthesized trifluoromethanol is protonated by superacids, for example HSbF_{6} (fluoroantimonic acid), the equilibrium can be further shifted to the left towards the desired product. Other primary and secondary perfluoroalcohols exhibit similar instability.

At temperatures in the range of −120 °C, trifluoromethanol can be prepared by treating trifluoromethyl hypochlorite with hydrogen chloride:

CF_{3}OCl + HCl → CF_{3}OH + Cl_{2}

In this reaction, the recombination of a partially positively charged chlorine atom (in trifluoromethyl hypochlorite) with a partially negatively charged chlorine atom (in hydrogen chloride) is used as elemental chlorine. The undesired products, by-products chlorine, hydrogen chloride, and chlorotrifluoromethane, can be removed by evaporation at −110 °C. Trifluoromethanol has a melting point of −82 °C and a calculated boiling point of about −20 °C. The boiling point is thus about 85 K lower than that of methanol. This fact can be explained by the absence of intramolecular H—F bonds, which are also not visible in the infrared gas phase spectrum.

== Trifluoromethoxide ==
Trifluoromethoxide (CF_{3}O^{−}) is the conjugate base of trifluoromethanol. Installing the trifluoromethoxy group, trifluoromethoxylation, is a well developed theme in agricultural and medicinal chemistry.

Solutions or trifluoromethoxide can be prepared by treating carbonyl fluoride with sources of fluoride ion, e.g. NaF):

COF_{2} + F^{−} → CF_{3}O^{−}

Some trifluoromethylethers can be cleaved to release trifluoromethoxide.

CF_{3}OAr + Nu → [Nu−Ar]^{+}[CF_{3}O]^{−} (Nu = nucleophile, Ar = aryl group)

Trifluoromethyl benzoate is a related source of the trifluoromethoxide ion.

In aqueous media, the CF_{3}O^{−} decomposes at room temperature.

Inorganic trifluoromethoxides MOCF_{3} vary in their stability, depending strongly on the countercation present. For example, Li, Na salts have not been isolated due to their instability toward decomposition to MF and COF_{2}. On the other hand, the Cs salt is stable at room temperature and only decomposes slowly at 80 °C (<10% decomposition over 60 min), while the K and Rb salts are much more thermally labile. In general, large cations stabilize the salt, with S(NMe_{2})_{3}^{+} and NR_{4}^{+} (R = alkyl) derivatives also demonstrating appreciable stability. While AgOCF_{3} is poorly characterized and of low stability, the dimeric phosphine adduct [(^{t}Bu_{2}PhP)Ag(μ-OCF_{3})]_{2} has been demonstrated to possess good thermal stability and ability to serve as a nucleophilic OCF_{3} source.

== Occurrence in upper layers of atmosphere ==
Trifluoromethanol is generated in the stratosphere from CF_{3}^{•} radicals:

CF_{3}^{•} + O_{2} + M → CF_{3}O_{2}^{•} + M (M = third body)
CF_{3}O_{2}^{•} + NO → CF_{3}O^{•} + NO_{2}
CF_{3}O_{2}^{•} + RH → CF_{3}OH + R^{•} (R = alkyl, hydroxyl)

While trifluoromethanol is unstable under normal conditions, in the atmosphere, its uncatalyzed decomposition is negligible due to the high activation energy of the gas-phase reaction (45–46 kcal·mol^{−1}). Moreover, its photolytic lifetime is several million years at altitudes below 40 km. Instead, its decomposition to carbonyl fluoride and hydrogen fluoride is believed to be catalyzed by species such as formic acid.

== See also ==
- Trifluoroethanol
