= Phosgene =

Toxic gaseous compound (COCl2)

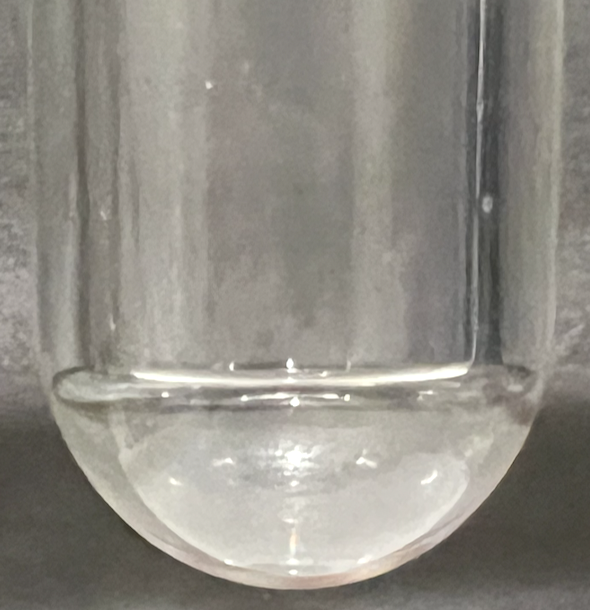
- Liquified phosgene

- Full structural formula with dimensions

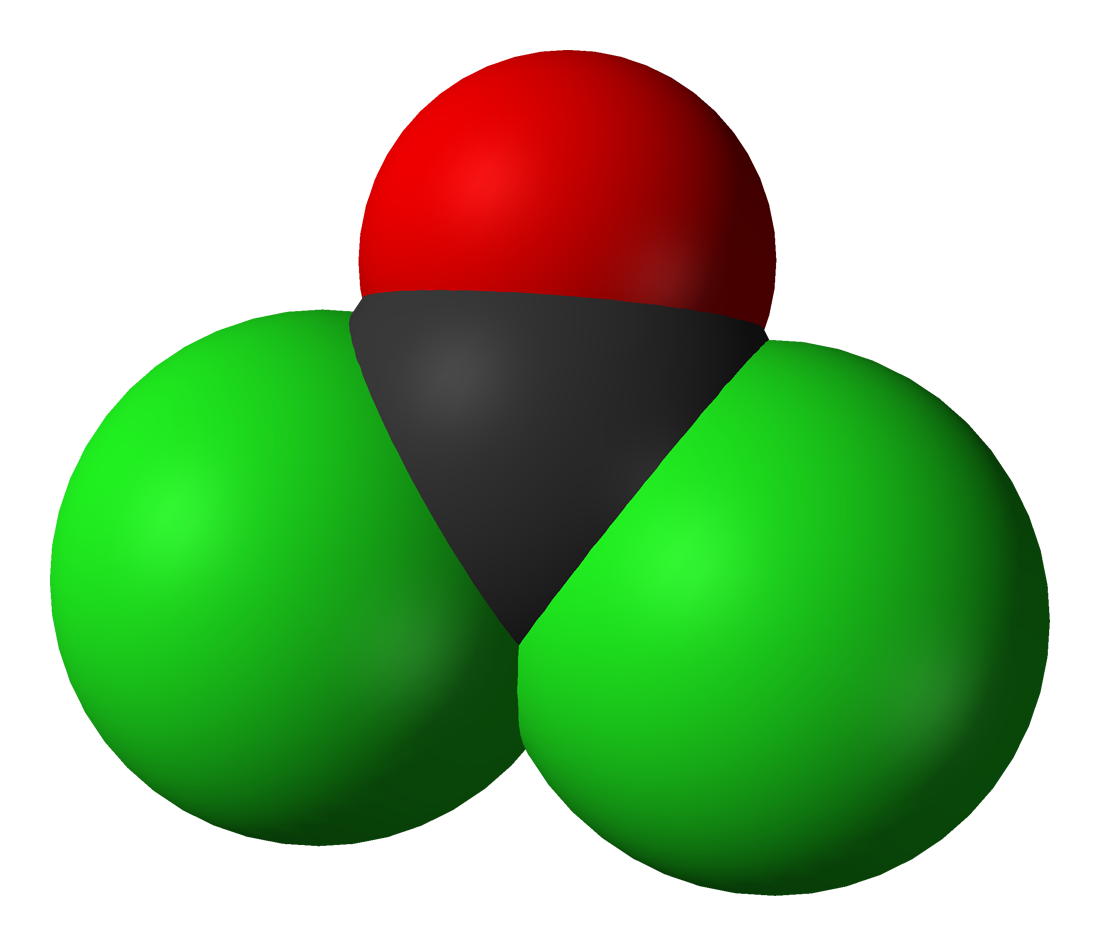
- Space-filling model

Names
- Preferred IUPAC name Carbonyl dichloride
- Other names: Carbon dichloride oxide; Carbon oxychloride; Carbonyl chloride; CG; Chloroformyl chloride; Collongite; Dichloroformaldehyde; Dichloromethanal; Dichloromethanone; Oxycarbon dichloride

Identifiers
CAS Number	75-44-5
3D model (JSmol)	Interactive image
ChEBI	CHEBI:29365
ChemSpider	6131
ECHA InfoCard	100.000.792
EC Number	200-870-3
PubChem CID	6371
RTECS number	SY5600000
UNII	117K140075
UN number	1076
CompTox Dashboard (EPA)	DTXSID0024260
- InChI: InChI=1S/CCl2O/c2-1(3)4 Key: YGYAWVDWMABLBF-UHFFFAOYSA-N; InChI=1/CCl2O/c2-1(3)4 Key: YGYAWVDWMABLBF-UHFFFAOYAH
- SMILES: ClC(Cl)=O

Properties
Chemical formula	COCl_{2}
Molar mass	98.91 g·mol^{−1}
Appearance	Colorless gas
Odor	Suffocating, like musty hay or grass
Density	4.248 g/L (15 °C, gas); 1.432 g/cm^{3} (0 °C, liquid)
Melting point	−118 °C (−180 °F; 155 K)
Boiling point	8.3 °C (46.9 °F; 281.4 K)
Solubility in water	Insoluble, hydrolyzes to hydrogen chloride and carbon dioxide.
Solubility	Soluble in benzene, toluene, acetic acid (glacial/anhydrous); Decomposes in alcohol and acid
Vapor pressure	1.6 atm (20°C)
Magnetic susceptibility (χ)	−48·10^{−6} cm^{3}/mol

Structure
Molecular shape	Trigonal planar
Dipole moment	1.17 D

Hazards
- GHS labelling
Pictograms	(GHS05: Corrosive) (GHS06: Toxic)
Signal word	Danger
Hazard statements	H314, H330
Precautionary statements	P260, P280, P303+P361+P353+P315, P304+P340+P315, P305+P351+P338+P315, P403, P405
NFPA 704 (fire diamond)	4 0 1
Flash point	Nonflammable
Threshold limit value (TLV)	0.1 ppm (1 ppm = 4 mg/m^{3})
- Lethal dose or concentration (LD, LC)
LC_{50} (median concentration)	500 ppm (human, 1 min); 340 ppm (rat, 30 min); 438 ppm (mouse, 30 min); 243 ppm (rabbit, 30 min); 316 ppm (guinea pig, 30 min); 1022 ppm (dog, 20 min); 145 ppm (monkey, 1 min); 1 ppm is 4 mg/m^{3}
LC_{Lo} (lowest published)	3 ppm (human, 2.83 h); 30 ppm (human, 17 min); 50 ppm (mammal, 5 min); 88 ppm (human, 30 min); 46 ppm (cat, 15 min); 50 ppm (human, 5 min); 2.7 ppm (mammal, 30 min); 1 ppm is 4 mg/m^{3}
- NIOSH (US health exposure limits)
PEL (Permissible)	TWA 0.1 ppm (0.4 mg/m^{3})
REL (Recommended)	TWA 0.1 ppm (0.4 mg/m^{3}) C 0.2 ppm (0.8 mg/m^{3}) [15-minute]
IDLH (Immediate danger)	2 ppm 1 ppm = 4 mg/m^{3}
- Safety data sheet (SDS)

Related compounds
Related compounds	Thiophosgene; Formaldehyde; Carbonic acid; Urea; Carbon monoxide; Chloroformic acid; Phosgene oxime
- Except where otherwise noted, data are given for materials in their standard state (at 25 °C [77 °F], 100 kPa). verify (what is ?) Infobox references

Phosgene is an organic chemical compound with the formula COCl_{2}. It is a toxic, colorless gas; in low concentrations, its musty odor resembles that of freshly cut hay or grass. It can be thought of chemically as the double acyl chloride analog of carbonic acid, or structurally as formaldehyde with the hydrogen atoms replaced by chlorine atoms. In 2013, about 75–80% of global phosgene was consumed for isocyanates, 18% for polycarbonates and about 5% for other fine chemicals.

Phosgene is extremely poisonous and was used as a chemical weapon during World War I, where it was responsible for 85,000 deaths. It is a highly potent pulmonary irritant and quickly filled enemy trenches due to it being a heavy gas.

It is classified as a Schedule 3 substance under the Chemical Weapons Convention. In addition to its industrial production, small amounts occur from the breakdown and the combustion of organochlorine compounds, such as chloroform.

== Structure and basic properties ==
Phosgene is a planar molecule as predicted by VSEPR theory. The C=O distance is 1.18 Å, the C−Cl distance is 1.74 Å and the Cl−C−Cl angle is 111.8°. Phosgene is a carbon oxohalide and it can be considered one of the simplest acyl chlorides, being formally derived from carbonic acid.

== Production ==
Industrially, phosgene is produced by passing purified carbon monoxide and chlorine gas through a bed of porous activated carbon, which serves as a catalyst:

CO + Cl_{2} → COCl_{2} (ΔH_{rxn} = −107.6 kJ/mol)

This reaction is exothermic and is typically performed between 50 and 150 °C. Above 200 °C, phosgene reverts to carbon monoxide and chlorine, K_{eq}(300 K) = 0.05. World production of this compound was estimated to be 2.74 million tonnes in 1989.

Phosgene is fairly simple to produce, but it is also listed as a Schedule 3 substance under the Chemical Weapons Convention. As such, it is usually considered too dangerous to transport in bulk quantities. Instead, phosgene is usually produced and consumed within the same plant, as part of an "on demand" process. This involves maintaining equivalent rates of production and consumption, which keeps the amount of phosgene in the system at any one time fairly low, reducing the risks in the event of an accident. Some batch production does still take place, but efforts are made to reduce the amount of phosgene stored.

=== Inadvertent generation ===
==== Atmospheric chemistry ====
Simple organochlorides slowly convert into phosgene when exposed to ultraviolet (UV) irradiation in the presence of oxygen. Before the discovery of the ozone hole in the late 1970s large quantities of organochlorides were routinely used by industry, which inevitably led to them entering the atmosphere. In the 1970-80s phosgene levels in the troposphere were around 20-30 parts per trillion by volume (peak 60 parts per trillion by volume). These levels have decreased over several subsequent decades. Organochloride production is restricted under the Montreal Protocol.

Phosgene in the troposphere can last up to about 70 days and is removed primarily by hydrolysis with ambient humidity or cloud water. Less than 1% makes it to the stratosphere, where it is expected to have a lifetime of several years, since this layer is much drier and phosgene decomposes slowly through UV photolysis. It plays a minor part in ozone depletion.

==== Combustion ====
Carbon tetrachloride (CCl_{4}) can turn into phosgene when exposed to heat in air. This was a problem as carbon tetrachloride is an effective fire suppressant and was formerly in widespread use in fire extinguishers. There are reports of fatalities caused by its use to fight fires in confined spaces. Carbon tetrachloride's generation of phosgene and its own toxicity mean it is no longer used for this purpose.

==== Biologically ====
Phosgene is also formed as a metabolite of chloroform, likely via the action of cytochrome P-450.

== History ==
Phosgene was synthesized by the Cornish chemist John Davy (1790–1868) in 1812 by exposing a mixture of carbon monoxide and chlorine to sunlight. He named it "phosgene" from Greek φῶς (phos, light) and γεννάω (gennaō, to give birth) in reference of the use of light to promote the reaction. It gradually became important in the chemical industry as the 19th century progressed, particularly in dye manufacturing.

== Reactions and uses ==
The reaction of an organic substrate with phosgene is called phosgenation. Phosgenation of diols give carbonates (R = H, alkyl, aryl), which can be either linear or cyclic:

n HO−CR_{2}−X−CR_{2}−OH + n COCl_{2} → [−O−CR_{2}−X−CR_{2}−O−C(=O)−]_{n} + 2n HCl

An example is the reaction of phosgene with bisphenol A to form polycarbonates. Phosgenation of diamines gives di-isocyanates, like toluene diisocyanate (TDI), methylene diphenyl diisocyanate (MDI), hexamethylene diisocyanate (HDI), and isophorone diisocyanate (IPDI). In these conversions, phosgene is used in excess to increase yield and minimize side reactions. The phosgene excess is separated during the work-up of resulting end products and recycled into the process, with any remaining phosgene decomposed in water using activated carbon as the catalyst. Diisocyanates are precursors to polyurethanes. More than 90% of the phosgene is used in these processes, with the biggest production units located in the United States (Texas and Louisiana), Germany, Shanghai, Japan, and South Korea. The most important producers are Dow Chemical, Covestro, and BASF. Phosgene is also used to produce monoisocyanates, used as pesticide precursors (e.g. methyl isocyanate (MIC).

Aside from the widely used reactions described above, phosgene is also used to produce acyl chlorides from carboxylic acids:

R−C(=O)−OH + COCl_{2} → R−C(=O)−Cl + HCl + CO_{2}

For this application, thionyl chloride is commonly used instead of phosgene.

=== Laboratory uses ===
The synthesis of isocyanates from amines illustrates the electrophilic character of this reagent and its use in introducing the equivalent synthon "CO^{2+}":

R−NH_{2} + COCl_{2} → R−N=C=O + 2 HCl, where R = alkyl, aryl

Such reactions are conducted on laboratory scale in the presence of a base such as pyridine that neutralizes the hydrogen chloride side-product.

Phosgene is used to produce chloroformates such as benzyl chloroformate:

R−OH + COCl_{2} → R−O−C(=O)−Cl + HCl

In these syntheses, phosgene is used in excess to prevent formation of the corresponding carbonate ester.

With amino acids, phosgene (or its trimer) reacts to give amino acid N-carboxyanhydrides. More generally, phosgene acts to link two nucleophiles by a carbonyl group. For this purpose, alternatives to phosgene such as carbonyldiimidazole (CDI) are safer, albeit expensive. CDI itself is prepared by reacting phosgene with imidazole.

Phosgene is stored in metal cylinders. In the US, the cylinder valve outlet is a tapered thread known as "CGA 160" that is used only for phosgene.

=== Alternatives to phosgene ===
In the research laboratory, due to safety concerns, phosgene nowadays finds limited use in organic synthesis. A variety of substitutes have been developed, notably trichloromethyl chloroformate ("diphosgene"), a liquid at room temperature, and bis(trichloromethyl) carbonate ("triphosgene"), a crystalline substance.

=== Other reactions ===
Phosgene reacts with water to release hydrogen chloride and carbon dioxide:

COCl_{2} + H_{2}O → CO_{2} + 2 HCl

Analogously, upon contact with ammonia, it converts to urea:

COCl_{2} + 4 NH_{3} → CO(NH_{2})_{2} + 2 [NH_{4}]Cl

Halide exchange with nitrogen trifluoride and aluminium tribromide gives COF_{2} and COBr_{2}, respectively.

=== Chemical warfare ===
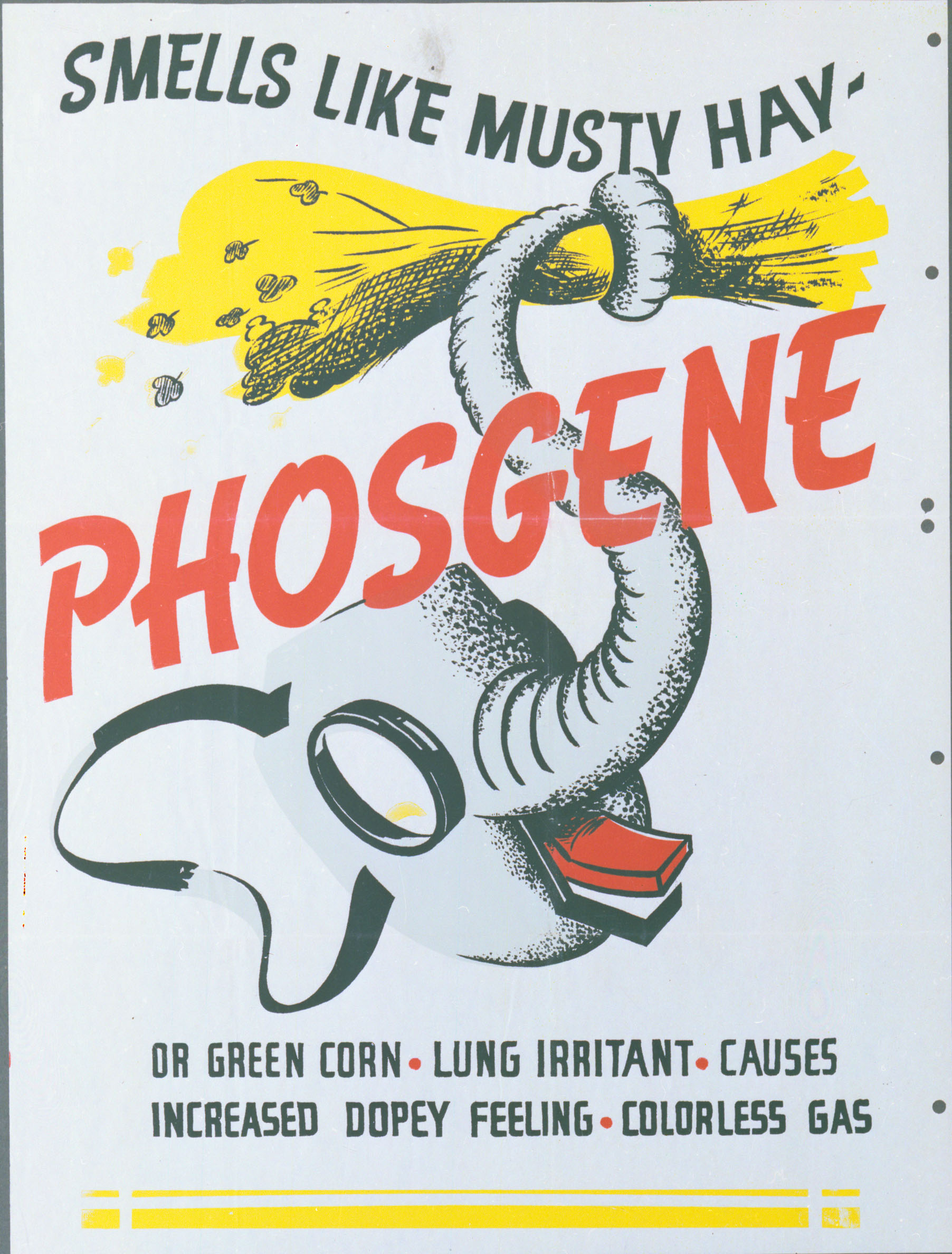
US Army phosgene identification poster from World War II

It is listed on Schedule 3 of the Chemical Weapons Convention: All production sites manufacturing more than 30 tonnes per year must be declared to the OPCW. Although less toxic than many other chemical weapons such as sarin, phosgene is still regarded as a viable chemical warfare agent because of its simpler manufacturing requirements when compared to that of more technically advanced chemical weapons such as tabun, a first-generation nerve agent.

Phosgene was first deployed as a chemical weapon by the French in 1915 in World War I. It was also used in a mixture with an equal volume of chlorine, with the chlorine helping to spread the denser phosgene. Phosgene was more potent than chlorine, though some symptoms took 24 hours or more to manifest.

Following the extensive use of phosgene during World War I, it was stockpiled by various countries.

Phosgene was then only infrequently used by the Imperial Japanese Army against the Chinese during the Second Sino-Japanese War. Gas weapons, such as phosgene, were produced by the IJA's Unit 731.

During World War II, the United States considered using phosgene against troops in bunkers and caves, types of fortification that the Japanese had used to great effect during the Battle of Luzon and Battle of Okinawa. Tests conducted at Dugway Proving Ground by the Chemical Warfare Service showed that the gas would "pour into a cave almost like water", expanding rapidly, and reach concentrations high enough to kill even those wearing gas masks. Operation Olympic, the planned invasion of Kyūshū, included provisions for using phosgene.

== Toxicology and safety ==
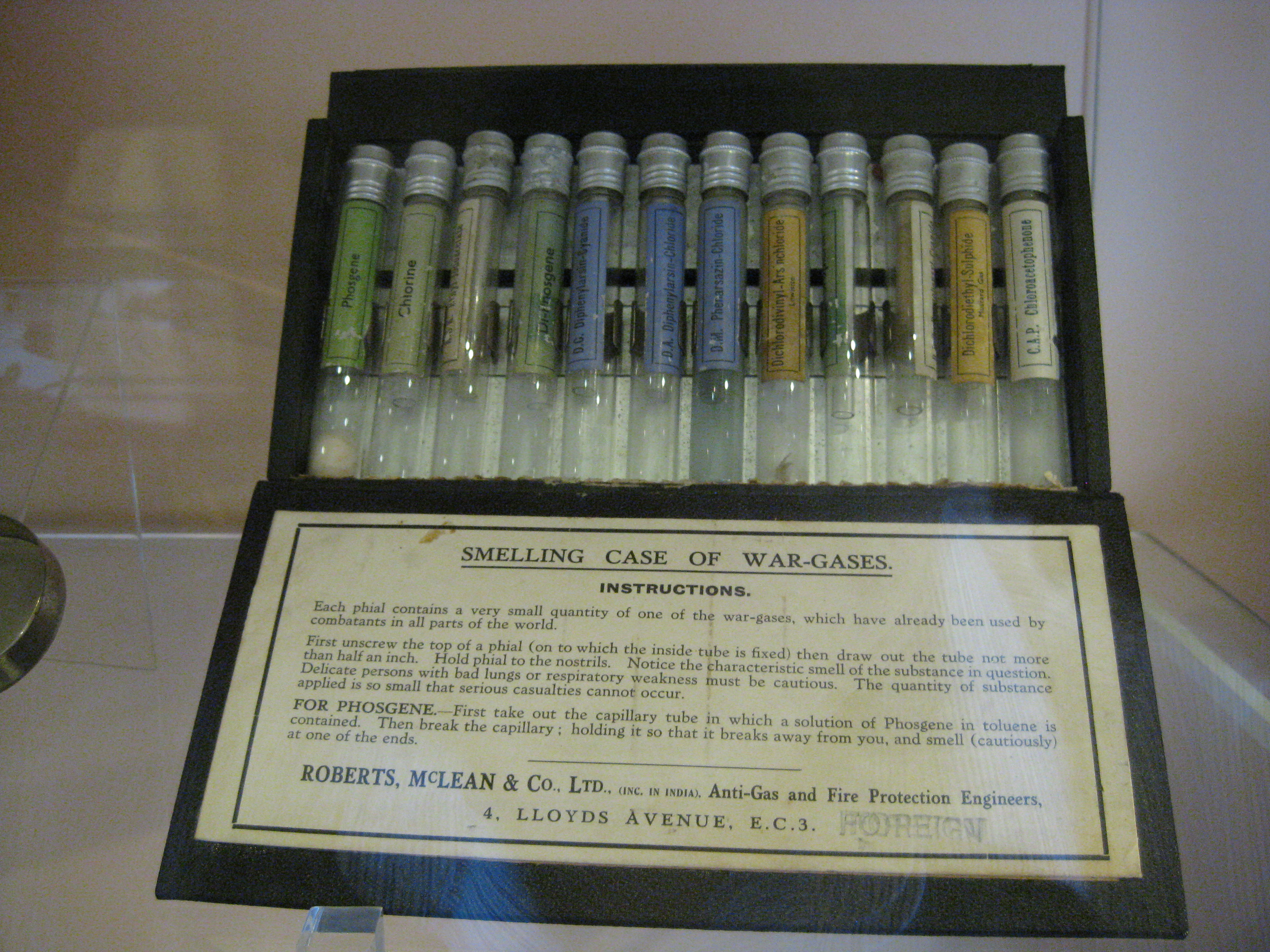
A sample case of toxic gases used in chemical warfare; the leftmost contains phosgene in a sealed capillary

Phosgene is an insidious poison as the odor may not be noticed and symptoms may be slow to appear.

At low concentrations, phosgene may have a pleasant odor of freshly mown hay or green corn, but has also been described as sweet, like rotten banana peels. The odor detection threshold for phosgene is 0.4 ppm, four times the threshold limit value (time weighted average). Its high toxicity arises from the action of the phosgene on the −OH, −NH_{2} and −SH groups of the proteins in pulmonary alveoli (the site of gas exchange), respectively forming ester, amide and thioester functional groups in accord with the reactions discussed above. This results in disruption of the blood–air barrier, eventually causing pulmonary edema. The extent of damage in the alveoli does not primarily depend on phosgene concentration in the inhaled air, with the dose (amount of inhaled phosgene) being the critical factor. Dose can be approximately calculated as "concentration" × "duration of exposure". Therefore, persons in workplaces where there exists risk of accidental phosgene release usually wear indicator badges close to the nose and mouth. Such badges indicate the approximate inhaled dose, which allows for immediate treatment if the monitored dose rises above safe limits.

In case of low or moderate quantities of inhaled phosgene, the exposed person is to be monitored and subjected to precautionary therapy, then released after several hours. For higher doses of inhaled phosgene (above 150 ppm × min) a pulmonary edema often develops which can be detected by X-ray imaging and regressive blood oxygen concentration. Inhalation of such high doses can eventually result in fatality within hours or up to 2–3 days after exposure.

The risk connected to a phosgene inhalation is based not so much on its toxicity (which is much lower in comparison to modern chemical weapons like sarin or tabun) but rather on its typical effects: the affected person may not develop any symptoms for hours until an edema appears, at which point it could be too late for medical treatment to assist. Nearly all fatalities as a result of accidental releases from the industrial handling of phosgene occurred in this fashion. On the other hand, pulmonary edemas treated in a timely manner usually heal in the mid- and longterm, without major consequences once some days or weeks after exposure have passed. Nonetheless, the detrimental health effects on pulmonary function from untreated, chronic low-level exposure to phosgene should not be ignored; although not exposed to concentrations high enough to immediately cause an edema, many synthetic chemists (e.g. Leonidas Zervas) working with the compound were reported to experience chronic respiratory health issues and eventual respiratory failure from continuous low-level exposure.

If accidental release of phosgene occurs in an industrial or laboratory setting, it can be mitigated with ammonia gas; in the case of liquid spills (e.g. of diphosgene or phosgene solutions) an absorbent and sodium carbonate can be applied.

== Accidents ==
- The first major phosgene-related incident happened in May 1928 when eleven tons of phosgene escaped from a war surplus store in central Hamburg. Three hundred people were poisoned, of whom ten died.
- In the second half of 20th century several fatal incidents implicating phosgene occurred in Europe, Asia and the US. Most of them have been investigated by authorities and the outcome made accessible to the public. For example, phosgene was initially blamed for the Bhopal disaster, but investigations proved methyl isocyanate to be responsible for the numerous poisonings and fatalities.
- Recent major incidents happened in January 2010 and May 2016. An accidental release of phosgene gas at a DuPont facility in West Virginia killed one employee in 2010. The US Chemical Safety Board released a video detailing the accident. Six years later, a phosgene leak occurred in a BASF plant in South Korea, where a contractor inhaled a lethal dose of phosgene.
- 2023 Ohio train derailment: A freight train carrying vinyl chloride derailed and burned in East Palestine, Ohio, releasing phosgene and hydrogen chloride into the air and contaminating the Ohio River.

== See also ==
- Bis(trifluoromethyl) disulfide
- Carbonyl bromide
- Carbonyl fluoride
- Oxalyl chloride
- Perfluoroisobutene
- Thionyl chloride
- Thiophosgene
