= Carbonyl bromide =

Structural formula of carbonyl bromide
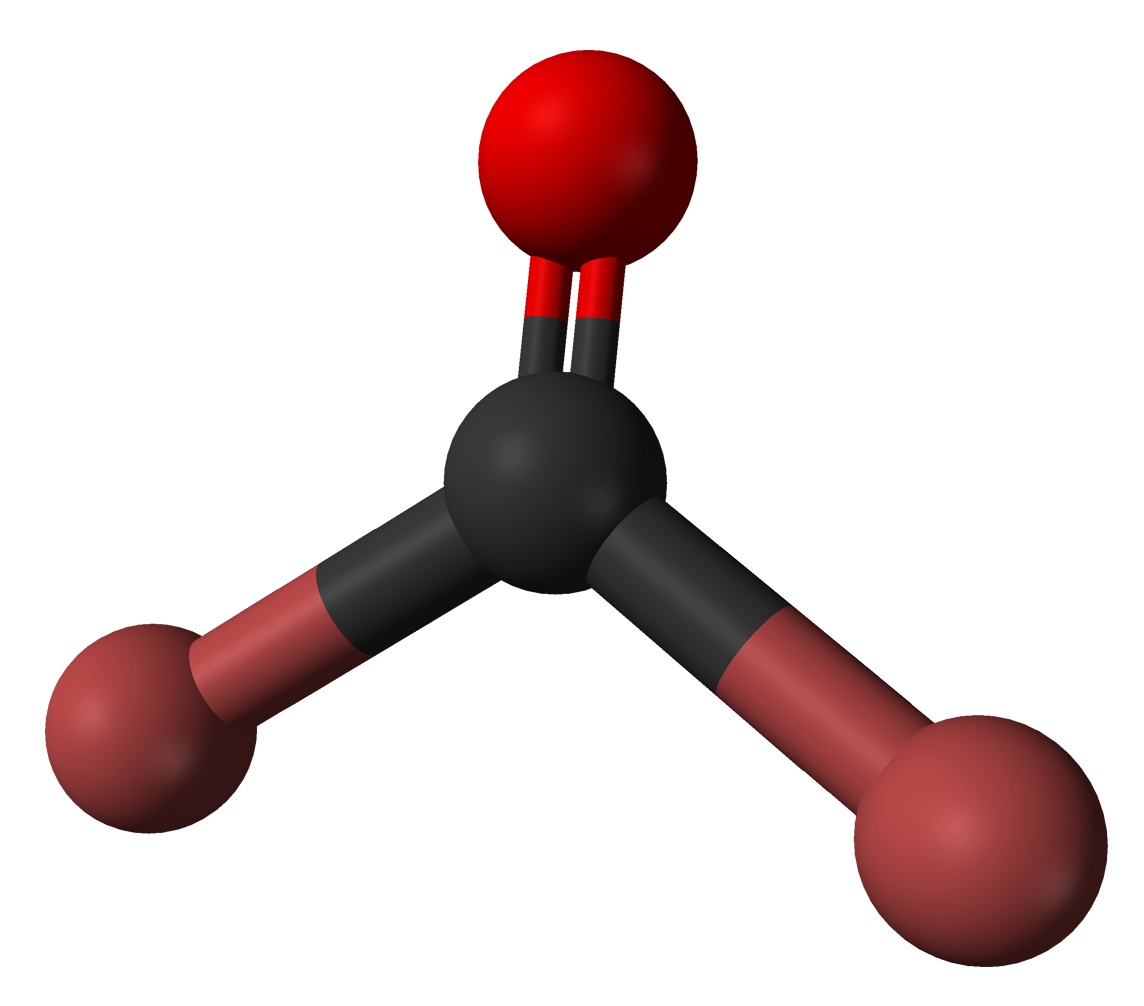
Ball-and-stick model of carbonyl bromide

Names
- Preferred IUPAC name Carbonyl dibromide
- Other names Bromophosgene, carbonic dibromide

Identifiers
CAS Number	593-95-3
3D model (JSmol)	Interactive image
ChemSpider	71389
PubChem CID	79057
UNII	MNU12QTS1I
CompTox Dashboard (EPA)	DTXSID20208041
- InChI: InChI=1S/CBr2O/c2-1(3)4 Key: MOIPGXQKZSZOQX-UHFFFAOYSA-N; InChI=1/CBr2O/c2-1(3)4 Key: MOIPGXQKZSZOQX-UHFFFAOYAM
- SMILES: BrC(Br)=O

Properties
Chemical formula	COBr_{2}
Molar mass	187.818 g·mol^{−1}
Appearance	colorless liquid
Density	2.52 g/mL at 15 °C
Boiling point	64.5 °C (148.1 °F; 337.6 K) decomposes
Solubility in water	reacts

Thermochemistry
Heat capacity (C)	61.8 J/(mol·K) (gas)
Std molar entropy (S^{⦵}_{298})	309.1 J/(mol·K) (gas)
Std enthalpy of formation (Δ_{f}H^{⦵}_{298})	−127.2 or −145.2 kJ/mol (liquid) −96.2 or −114 kJ/mol (gas)

Hazards
NFPA 704 (fire diamond)	4 0 1

Related compounds
Related compounds	Carbonyl fluoride Phosgene
- Except where otherwise noted, data are given for materials in their standard state (at 25 °C [77 °F], 100 kPa). verify (what is ?) Infobox references

Carbonyl bromide, also known as bromophosgene, is a carbon oxohalide and a bromine analogue of phosgene, with the chemical formula COBr_{2}. It is a colorless liquid. Carbonyl bromide is a decomposition product of halon compounds used in fire extinguishers.

== Synthesis and reactions ==
Carbonyl bromide is formed by the oxidation of carbon tetrabromide with sulfuric acid:

CBr_{4} + H_{2}SO_{4} → COBr_{2} + SO_{2} + Br_{2} + H_{2}O

In contrast to phosgene, carbonyl bromide cannot be produced efficiently by halogenation of carbon monoxide. The bromination of carbon monoxide follows this equation:

CO + Br_{2} ⇌ COBr_{2}

But the process is slow at room temperature. Increasing temperature, in order to increase the reaction rate, results in a shift of the chemical equilibrium towards the reactants (since ΔH < 0 and ΔS < 0).

Carbonyl bromide slowly decomposes to carbon monoxide and elemental bromine even at low temperatures. It is also sensitive to hydrolysis, breaking down into hydrogen bromide and carbon dioxide.
