= 4,4′-(Hexafluoroisopropylidene)diphthalic anhydride =

Names
- Preferred IUPAC name 5,5′-(1,1,1,3,3,3-Hexafluoropropane-2,2-diyl)di(2-benzofuran-1,3-dione)

Identifiers
CAS Number	1107-00-2
3D model (JSmol)	Interactive image
ChemSpider	63843
ECHA InfoCard	100.012.882
EC Number	214-170-0
PubChem CID	70677
UNII	N2GA6JCU7H
CompTox Dashboard (EPA)	DTXSID7061487
- InChI: InChI=1S/C19H6F6O6/c20-18(21,22)17(19(23,24)25,7-1-3-9-11(5-7)15(28)30-13(9)26)8-2-4-10-12(6-8)16(29)31-14(10)27/h1-6H Key: QHHKLPCQTTWFSS-UHFFFAOYSA-N
- SMILES: C1=CC2=C(C=C1C(C3=CC4=C(C=C3)C(=O)OC4=O)(C(F)(F)F)C(F)(F)F)C(=O)OC2=O

Properties
Chemical formula	C_{19}H_{6}F_{6}O_{6}
Molar mass	444.241 g·mol^{−1}

Hazards
- GHS labelling
Pictograms	(GHS05: Corrosive) (GHS07: Exclamation mark)
Signal word	Danger
Hazard statements	H314, H335
Precautionary statements	P260, P264, P271, P280, P301+P330+P331, P303+P361+P353, P304+P340, P305+P351+P338, P310, P312, P321, P363, P403+P233, P405, P501
- Except where otherwise noted, data are given for materials in their standard state (at 25 °C [77 °F], 100 kPa). Infobox references

4,4′-(Hexafluoroisopropylidene)diphthalic anhydride (6FDA) is an aromatic organofluorine compound and the dianhydride of 4,4′-(hexafluoroisopropylidene)bisphthalic acid (name derived from phthalic acid).

== Production ==
The raw materials for 6FDA are hexafluoroacetone and orthoxylene. With hydrogen fluoride as a catalyst, the compounds react to 4,4′-(hexafluoroisopropylidene)bis(o-xylene). This is oxidized with potassium permanganate to 4,4′-(hexafluoroisopropylidene)bisphthalic acid. Dehydration gives the dianhydride 6FDA.

More specifically, 4,4′-(Hexafluoroisopropylidene)diphthalic anhydride is synthesized through a multistep process in which hexafluoroacetone (HFA) reacts with xylenes in the presence of hydrogen fluoride, yielding 2,2-bis(3,4-dimethylphenyl)hexafluoropropane (I), also known as dixylylhexafluoropropane, DX-F6.

The bridged xylene (I) can be oxidized with potassium permanganate (KMnO_{4}) to produce the tetracarboxylic acid 2,2-bis(3,4-dicarboxyphenyl)hexafluoropropane (II). Industrially, this oxidation is also carried out using oxygen in the presence of cobalt(II) acetate, manganese(II) acetate, and hydrobromic acid in glacial acetic acid, achieving a yield of 88.4%.

Contamination of the final product with heavy metal ions, which is undesirable for electronic applications, X is eliminated during continuous oxidation with 35% nitric acid at temperatures above 200 °C under pressure.

Synthesis of 6FDA

The resulting tetracarboxylic acid has a purity of approximately 97%.

In the final step, the dianhydride (III) is obtained by dehydration via distillation with xylene. Further purification by recrystallization using acetic acid/acetic anhydride or by sublimation increases the product purity to over 99%.

== Properties ==
4,4′-(Hexafluoroisopropylidene)diphthalic anhydride is a crystalline white solid that hydrolyzes in water to form the corresponding tetracarboxylic acid. The resulting aqueous solution (10 g·cm^{−3} at 20 degrees Celsius) is acidic (pH 3). The dianhydride is soluble in many organic solvents.

== Applications ==
6FDA is used as monomer for the synthesis of fluorinated polyimides. These are prepared by the polymerisation of 6FDA with an aromatic diamine such as 3,5-diaminobenzoic acid or 4,4'-diaminodiphenyl sulfide. Such fluorinated polyimides exhibit a range of remarkable physical properties due to their trifluoromethyl groups and are used in special applications, e. g. used to make gas-permeable polymer membranes, in the field of microelectronics and optics, such as optical lenses from polymers, OLEDs, or high-performance CMOS-contact image sensors (CISs). These polyimides are typically soluble in common organic solvents, facilitating their production and processing. They have very low water absorption, which makes them particularly suitable for special optical applications.

More specifically, the properties of amorphous 6F polyimides (fluorinated polyimides, using 4,4′-(Hexafluoroisopropylidene)diphthalic anhydride as the dianhydride building block) include:

- High thermal stability, with glass transition temperatures well above 250 °C and low weight loss (5%) at temperatures exceeding 500 °C
- High mechanical strength, including high modulus of elasticity, tensile strength, and elongation at break of fibers and films
- Excellent chemical resistance to hydrolysis and low water absorption
- Outstanding solubility in many organic solvents, allowing easy processing into films and fibers
- High optical transparency and low refractive index
- Low dielectric constant, low thermal coefficient of expansion, and low surface energy

The production of fluorinated polyimides occurs in a two-step process in which the cyclic dianhydride 6FDA first reacts with a typically aromatic diamine to form a so-called polyamic acid via ring opening. Subsequent dehydration and cyclization (imidization) yield the polyimide.

6FDA-Polyimide

This reaction sequence can also be performed hydrothermally under "sustainable green" laboratory conditions and scales, i.e., in water under pressure and at elevated temperatures (200 °C), producing first the polyamic acid and then the polyimide.

The reaction of 6FDA with a diamine containing hydroxy groups, such as 3,3'-dihydroxybenzidine, initially forms the polyimide (A), which can undergo thermal elimination of carbon dioxide (CO_{2}) to form the corresponding polybenzoxazole (B).

Polybenzoxazoles with 6FDA

Due to their exceptional properties, 6F polyimides are used as materials for gas separation, as glass substitutes in flexible solar cells and OLED displays, as packaging films for electronic components, as optical fiber, and as composite materials in aerospace applications.
