= Midaflur =

Chemical compound

Clinical data
- ATC code: None

Identifiers
- IUPAC name: 2,2,5,5-Tetrakis(trifluoromethyl)-2,5-dihydro-1H-imidazol-4-amine
- CAS Number: 23757-42-8
- PubChem CID: 32068
- DrugBank: DB20284
- ChemSpider: 29737
- UNII: 840CTL676L
- KEGG: D05027
- ChEBI: CHEBI:751002
- ChEMBL: ChEMBL2104707
- CompTox Dashboard (EPA): DTXSID50178425

Chemical and physical data
- Formula: C_{7}H_{3}F_{12}N_{3}
- Molar mass: 357.103 g·mol^{−1}
- 3D model (JSmol): Interactive image
- SMILES: C1(=NC(NC1(C(F)(F)F)C(F)(F)F)(C(F)(F)F)C(F)(F)F)N
- InChI: InChI=1S/C7H3F12N3/c8-4(9,10)2(5(11,12)13)1(20)21-3(22-2,6(14,15)16)7(17,18)19/h22H,(H2,20,21); Key:KYWMWUUMCDZISK-UHFFFAOYSA-N

Midaflur (INN; EXP 338) is an extremely stable 3-imidazoline derivative with central skeletal muscle relaxant and sedative properties in humans and other mammals, exhibiting consistently high oral bioavailability and a long, dose-dependent, duration of action.

While its pharmacodynamics remain poorly understood, midaflur resembles mephenesin and (ostensibly) pentobarbital in terms of observed effects while being considerably more potent.

== History ==
Midaflur was developed at DuPont from the mid-1960s (development code EXP 338), entered clinical study in 1968, was investigated as a veterinary anesthetic by Ayerst Laboratories in Montreal in 1978-79, and was the subject of a further patent in 1980; it was never marketed.

== Synthesis ==
Synthesis: (DuPont and US3459766)

The compound was originally prepared from hexafluoroacetone imine and an alkali metal cyanide: three equivalents of the imine added to cyanide to give an intermediate, 4-[1-amino-2,2,2-trifluoro-1-(trifluoromethyl)ethylamino]-2,2,5,5-tetrakis(trifluoro methyl)-3-imidazoline, which on heating in concentrated sulfuric acid eliminated one imine unit to give midaflur.

== Chemistry and physical properties ==
Midaflur is a white crystalline solid with a melting point of 158-159°C. It is practically insoluble in water but soluble in vegetable oils, and is chemically unusually inert: it can be dissolved in hot (150°C) concentrated sulfuric acid and in 20% oleum and recovered unchanged on dilution, is unaffected by chlorine, bromine, hydrogen peroxide, peracids and hypochlorites at 100°C, does not react with anhydrous hydrazine at reflux, and is thermally stable to 500°C; hydrolysis to the corresponding imidazolidinone requires 90% sulfuric acid at 225°C. DuPont's patent literature notes that, despite the extreme inductive effect of the four trifluoromethyl substituents, the compound forms no salts with acids in aqueous solution, yet is titratable as a weak acid in non-aqueous solvent such as pyridine.

Since the imidazolidine and imidazoline forms are tautomers, the compound has been named both 4-amino-2,2,5,5-tetrakis(trifluoromethyl)-3-imidazoline and 5-imino-2,2,4,4-tetrakis(trifluoromethyl)imidazolidine in the literature. Middleton and Krespan assigned the amino tautomer on the basis of the ^{1}H NMR spectrum of ^{15}N-labelled material, in which ^{15}N from sodium cyanide is incorporated exclusively into the exocyclic nitrogen and both exchangeable protons show ^{15}N-^{1}H coupling to that nitrogen; they also observed restricted rotation about the exocyclic C-N bond, attributed to amide-like delocalisation.

An X-ray structure determination undertaken specifically to settle the tautomeric question reported a short exocyclic C-NH_{2} distance of 1.315(4) Å, "indicat[ing] a substantial resonance contribution from a >C=N^{+}H_{2} form", and showed the molecules paired into hydrogen-bonded dimers through N-H···N contacts between the amino hydrogens and the ring nitrogens of adjacent molecules. A 1:1 solvate with dimethyl sulfoxide has also been characterised crystallographically; its hydrogen-bonding scheme involves both N-H···O and N-H···N contacts, and the four trifluoromethyl-bearing carbons lie at approximately 89° to the plane of the imidazoline ring.

The measured octanol-water partition coefficient is log P = 3.35, determined at pH 6. Hansch and co-workers noted that the then-current fragment-based estimation program CLOGP (version 3.42) could not calculate a value for midaflur because "suitable fragment values are also not available", whereas the other 32 central nervous system agents in their test set were reproduced with a mean deviation of 0.20 log units.

== Site of action ==
The central site of the muscle-relaxant action was ultimately localised in rabbits by Mei and Zhu (Shanghai Institute of Physiology, 1980), using segmented injection into the cerebral ventricles. Application of midaflur to the cortical motor area (1 mg per side) produced no muscle relaxation.

Injection into the lateral ventricle produced dose-dependent head-drop and loss of the righting reflex, with a threshold between 0.2 and 0.5 mg. When the cerebral aqueduct was occluded with a tissue adhesive - the completeness of the block being verified by the failure of methylene blue to reach the fourth ventricle - injection into the lateral ventricle no longer produced muscle relaxation, whereas injection below the aqueduct did. The authors concluded that the effective site lies below the midbrain and that the spinal cord probably contributes; they also observed that muscle relaxation consistently outlasted loss of the righting reflex (5 h versus 1 h at the highest dose).

== Veterinary anesthesia ==
In 1978-79 midaflur was reevaluated at Ayerst as an injectable anesthetic for animals. Jaramillo reported that it depressed cortical electrical activity in rats in a manner unlike the volatile anesthetics studied in the same laboratory: rather than producing spindle-like bursts and high-amplitude slow waves, midaflur reduced amplitude and then frequency, and at 5 mg/kg intraperitoneally the righting reflex was lost with only small changes in the electroencephalogram. No evidence of metabolic defluorination was found: serum fluoride concentrations in treated rats were consistently lower than in untreated controls, reflecting reduced fluoride intake from diminished feeding, and urinary inorganic fluoride was unchanged.

A 1980 patent assigned to American Home Products describes intravenous midaflur as producing a surgical plane of anesthesia in dogs, cats, sheep, horses, pigs and primates, but notes that troublesome side effects - running movements and vocalisation - limited its usefulness; these were reduced or eliminated by co-administration of acepromazine (preferably the maleate), typically at a midaflur:acepromazine ratio of 100:1, with minimum effective doses of about 4.0/0.04 mg/kg in dogs and cats, 2.0/0.02 in sheep and 1.0/0.01 in horses.

== See also ==
- Mephenesin
- Pentobarbital
