= Oxalyl fluoride =

Structural formula of oxalyl fluoride
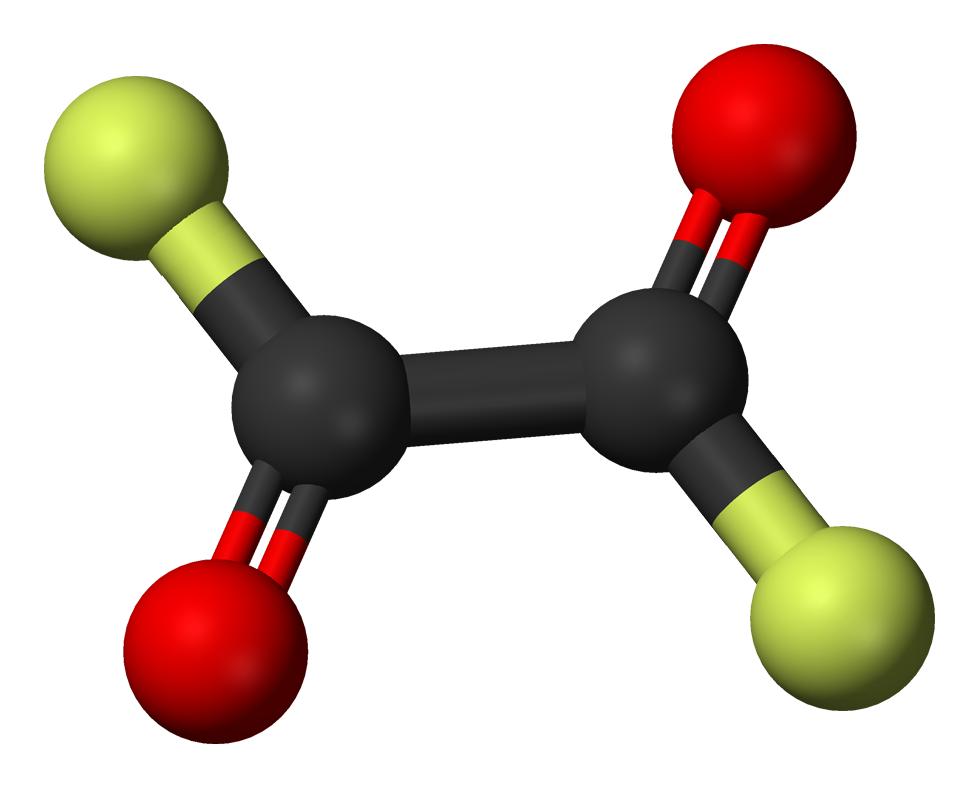
Ball-and-stick model of oxalyl fluoride

Names
- Preferred IUPAC name Oxalyl difluoride
- Other names TL-108

Identifiers
CAS Number	359-40-0
3D model (JSmol)	Interactive image
ChemSpider	9287
ECHA InfoCard	100.006.029
EC Number	206-630-4
PubChem CID	9668
UNII	2L7RR7QFL9
CompTox Dashboard (EPA)	DTXSID9059888
- InChI: InChI=1/C2F2O2/c3-1(5)2(4)6
- SMILES: C(=O)(C(=O)F)F

Properties
Chemical formula	C_{2}F_{2}O_{2}
Molar mass	94.017 g/mol
Melting point	−3 °C (27 °F; 270 K)
Boiling point	26.6 °C (79.9 °F; 299.8 K)
- Except where otherwise noted, data are given for materials in their standard state (at 25 °C [77 °F], 100 kPa). verify (what is ?) Infobox references

Oxalyl fluoride is the organofluorine compound with the formula (COF)_{2}. It is a fluorinated derivative of oxalic acid. This colorless liquid is prepared by reaction of sodium fluoride with oxalyl chloride.

Oxalyl fluoride is being investigated for use in etching as a replacement for compounds which have the liability of high global warming potential.

== See also ==
- Oxalyl chloride
- Oxalyl bromide
- Dioxane tetraketone
- Oxalyl
