= Hexafluoroacetone =

- Hexafluoropropanone skeletal structure

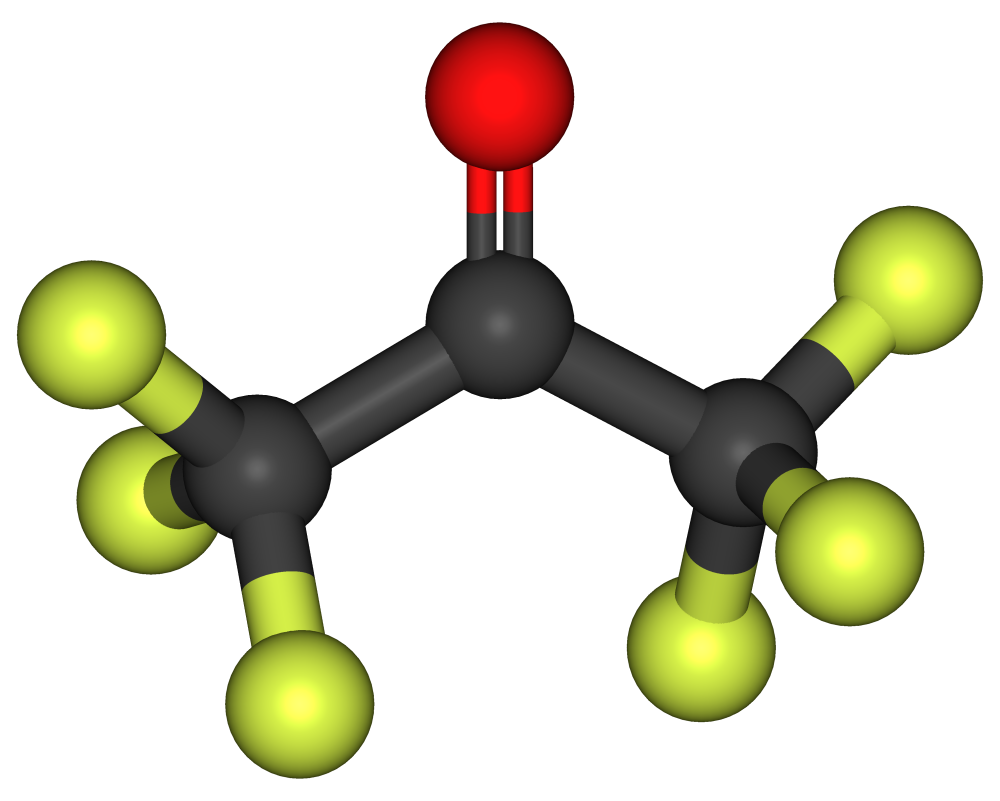
- Hexafluoropropanone 3D structure

Names
- Preferred IUPAC name 1,1,1,3,3,3-Hexafluoropropan-2-one
- Other names perfluoroacetone acetone hexafluoride perfluoro-2-propanone

Identifiers
CAS Number	684-16-2
3D model (JSmol)	Interactive image
ChEBI	CHEBI:39429
ChemSpider	13846015
ECHA InfoCard	100.010.616
EC Number	211-676-3
PubChem CID	12695
RTECS number	UC2450000
UNII	AKU9463N1Y
UN number	2420
CompTox Dashboard (EPA)	DTXSID9043778
- InChI: InChI=1S/C3F6O/c4-2(5,6)1(10)3(7,8)9 Key: VBZWSGALLODQNC-UHFFFAOYSA-N; InChI=1/C3F6O/c4-2(5,6)1(10)3(7,8)9 Key: VBZWSGALLODQNC-UHFFFAOYAI
- SMILES: FC(F)(F)C(=O)C(F)(F)F

Properties
Chemical formula	C_{3}F_{6}O
Molar mass	166.02 g/mol
Appearance	Colorless gas
Odor	musty
Density	1.32 g/ml, liquid
Melting point	−129 °C (144 K)
Boiling point	−28 °C (245 K)
Solubility in water	Reacts with water
Vapor pressure	5.8 atm (20 °C)

Hazards
- Occupational safety and health (OHS/OSH)
Main hazards	Toxic (T), Corrosive (C)
- GHS labelling
Pictograms	(GHS05: Corrosive) (GHS06: Toxic) (GHS07: Exclamation mark) (GHS08: Health hazard)
Signal word	Danger
Hazard statements	H301, H310, H311, H314, H315, H330, H360, H370, H372
Precautionary statements	P201, P202, P260, P262, P264, P270, P271, P280, P281, P284, P301+P310, P301+P330+P331, P302+P350, P302+P352, P303+P361+P353, P304+P340, P305+P351+P338, P307+P311, P308+P313, P310, P312, P314, P320, P321, P330, P332+P313, P361, P362, P363, P403+P233, P405, P410+P403, P501
NFPA 704 (fire diamond)	3 0 2 W
Flash point	Nonflammable
- NIOSH (US health exposure limits)
PEL (Permissible)	none
REL (Recommended)	TWA 0.1 ppm (0.7 mg/m^{3}) [skin]
IDLH (Immediate danger)	N.D.

Related compounds
Related ketones; organofluorides	Acetone; Hexafluoro-2-propanol
- Except where otherwise noted, data are given for materials in their standard state (at 25 °C [77 °F], 100 kPa). verify (what is ?) Infobox references

Hexafluoroacetone (HFA) is a chemical compound with the formula (CF_{3})_{2}CO. It is structurally similar to acetone; however, its reactivity is markedly different. It is a colourless, hygroscopic, nonflammable, highly reactive gas characterized by a musty odour. According to electron diffraction, HFA and acetone adopt very similar structures, the C-O distance being only longer in the fluorinated compound (124.6 vs 121.0 pm), possibly due to steric effects.

The term "hexafluoroacetone" can refer to the sesquihydrate (1.5 H_{2}O), which is a hemihydrate of hexafluoropropane-2,2-diol (F_{3}C)_{2}C(OH)_{2}, a geminal diol. Hydrated HFA behaves differently from the anhydrous material.

== Synthesis ==
The industrial route to HFA involves treatment of hexachloroacetone with HF:

(CCl_{3})_{2}CO + 6 HF → (CF_{3})_{2}CO + 6 HCl

=== Laboratory methods ===
Hydrated HFA can be converted to HFA by treatment with hot sulfuric acid.

It has also been prepared from hexafluoropropylene oxide, which will rearrange to give HFA when heated in the presence of a Lewis acid such as AlCl_{3}. The Lewis acid catalysed oxidation of hexafluoropropylene will also produce HFA, via a similar mechanism.

Although it is commercially available, HFA can be prepared on the laboratory-scale from hexafluoropropylene. In the first step KF catalyzes the reaction of the alkene with elemental sulfur to give the 1,3-dithietane dimer of hexafluorothioacetone. This species is then oxidized by potassium iodate to give HFA.

== Uses ==
Hexafluoroacetone is used in the production of hexafluoroisopropanol:

(CF_{3})_{2}CO + H_{2} → (CF_{3})_{2}CHOH

It is also used as a precursor to hexafluoroisobutylene, a monomer used in polymer chemistry, and as a building block in the synthesis of midaflur, bisphenol AF, 4,4′-(hexafluoroisopropylidene)diphthalic anhydride, and alitame.

== Reactivity ==
Hexafluoroacetone imine is an unusual primary ketimine that is isolable.

Ammonia adduct of hexafluoroacetone

With water, hexafluoroacetone converts to the hydrate. The equilibrium constant (K_{eq}) for the formation of this geminal diol is 10^{6} M^{−1}. The analogous equilibrium for acetone is an unfavorable 10^{−3} M^{−1}. Hexafluoroacetone-hydrates are acidic. In an analogous reaction, ammonia adds to hexafluoroacetone to give the hemiaminal (CF_{3})_{2}C(OH)(NH_{2}) which can be dehydrated with phosphoryl chloride to give the imine (CF_{3})_{2}CNH.

Nucleophiles attack occurs at the carbonyl carbon of hexafluoroacetone, as illustrated above. Thus, HFA readily forms lactones when treated with hydroxy- and amine-substituted carboxylic acids. In such reactions, HFA serves both as electrophile and dehydrating agent:

RCH(OH)CO_{2}H + O=C(CF_{3})_{2} → RCH(O)CO_{2}C(CF_{3})_{2} + (HO)_{2}C(CF_{3})_{2}

== See also ==
- Bromoacetone
- Chloroacetone
- Fluoroacetone
- Trifluoroacetone
- Novec 1230
- Hexafluorothioacetone
