= Carbonyl fluoride =

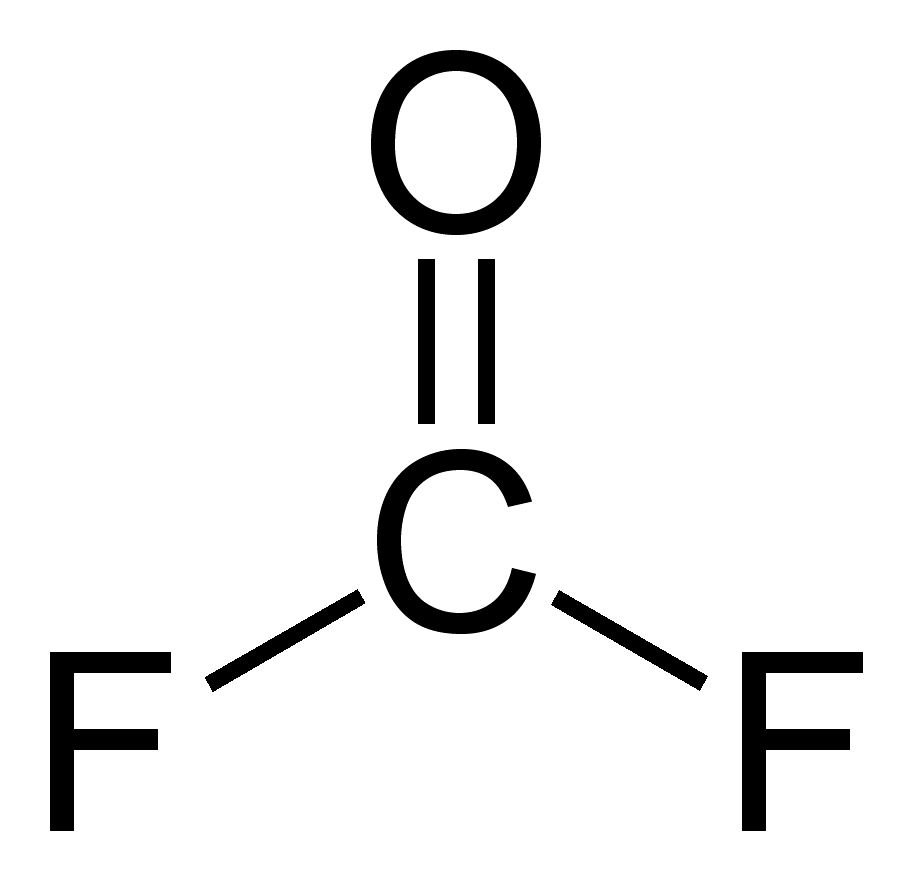
Structure of carbonyl fluoride
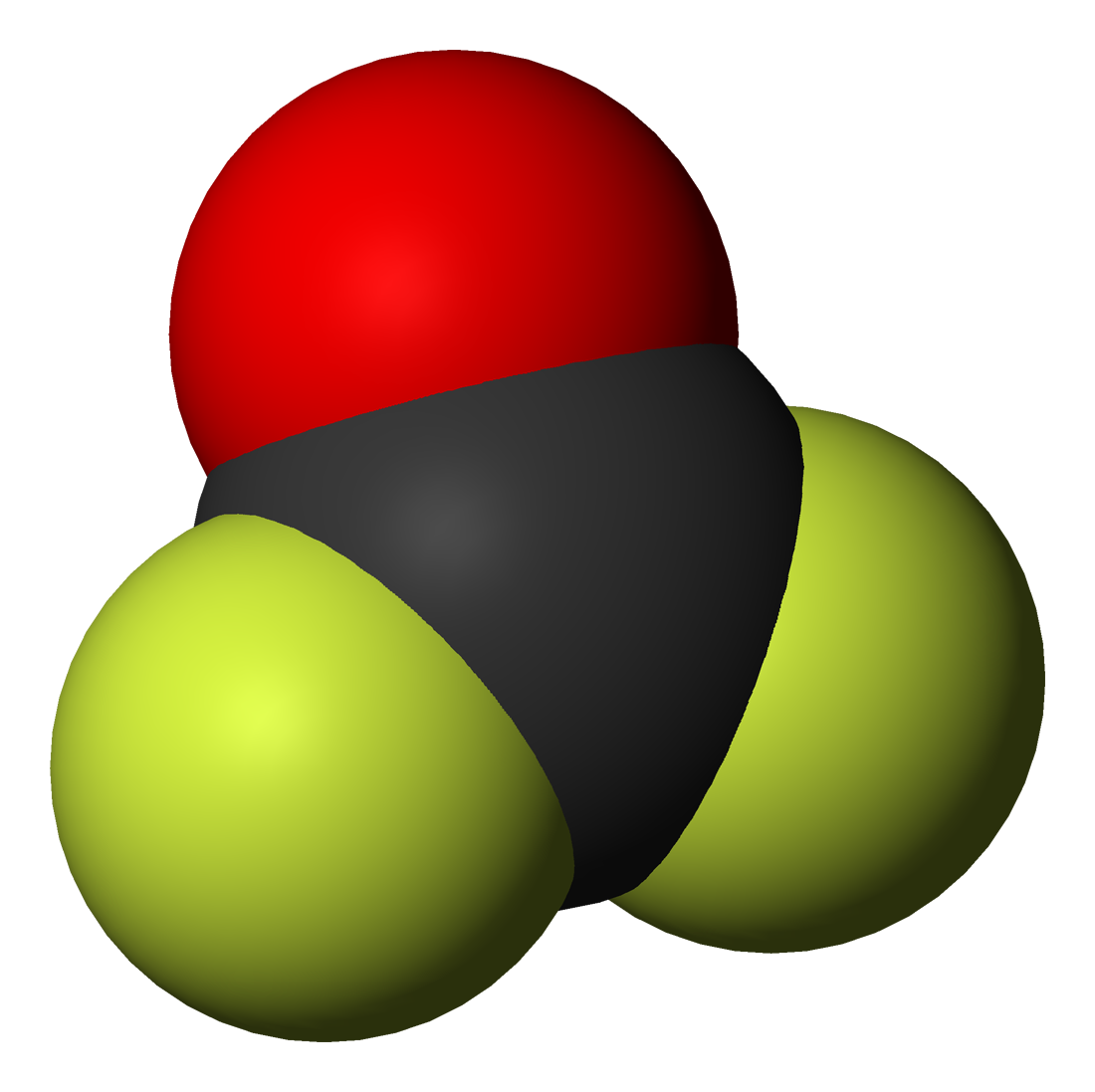
Space-filling model of the carbonyl fluoride molecule

Names
- Preferred IUPAC name Carbonyl difluoride
- Other names: Carbon difluoride oxide; Fluoromethanoyl fluoride; Fluorophosgene

Identifiers
CAS Number	353-50-4
3D model (JSmol)	Interactive image
ChemSpider	9246
ECHA InfoCard	100.005.941
EC Number	206-534-2
PubChem CID	9623
RTECS number	FG6125000
UNII	2NU89R5398
UN number	2417
CompTox Dashboard (EPA)	DTXSID7059858
- InChI: InChI=1S/CF2O/c2-1(3)4 Key: IYRWEQXVUNLMAY-UHFFFAOYSA-N; InChI=1/CF2O/c2-1(3)4 Key: IYRWEQXVUNLMAY-UHFFFAOYAE
- SMILES: FC(F)=O

Properties
Chemical formula	COF_{2}
Molar mass	66.007 g·mol^{−1}
Appearance	Colorless gas
Odor	Pungent and very irritating
Density	2.698 g/L (gas), 1.139 g/cm^{3} (liquid at melting point)
Melting point	−111.26 °C (−168.27 °F; 161.89 K)
Boiling point	−84.57 °C (−120.23 °F; 188.58 K)
Solubility in water	Reacts
Vapor pressure	55.4 atm (20°C)

Structure
Molecular shape	C_{2v}
Dipole moment	0.95 D

Hazards
- Occupational safety and health (OHS/OSH)
Main hazards	Very toxic, reacts with water to release HF
- GHS labelling
Pictograms	(GHS05: Corrosive) (GHS06: Toxic) (GHS08: Health hazard)
Signal word	Danger
Hazard statements	H290, H314, H330, H370
Precautionary statements	P234, P260, P264, P270, P271, P280, P284, P301+P330+P331, P303+P361+P353, P304+P340, P305+P351+P338, P307+P311, P310, P311, P320, P321, P363, P390, P403+P233, P404, P405, P410+P403, P501
NFPA 704 (fire diamond)	4 0 2 W
Flash point	Non-flammable
- NIOSH (US health exposure limits)
PEL (Permissible)	none
REL (Recommended)	TWA 2 ppm (5 mg/m^{3}) ST 5 ppm (15 mg/m^{3})
IDLH (Immediate danger)	N.D.

Related compounds
Related compounds	Phosgene; Carbonyl bromide; Formyl fluoride; Thiocarbonyl chloride; Acetone; Urea; Carbonic acid
- Except where otherwise noted, data are given for materials in their standard state (at 25 °C [77 °F], 100 kPa). verify (what is ?) Infobox references

Carbonyl fluoride is a chemical compound with the formula COF_{2}. It is a carbon oxohalide. This gas, like its analog phosgene, is colourless and highly toxic. The molecule is planar with C_{2v} symmetry, bond lengths of 1.174 Å (C=O) and 1.312 Å (C–F), and an F–C–F bond angle of 108.0°.

== Preparation ==
Carbonyl fluoride is produced from trifluoromethanol. The latter is produced in turn by protonation of in-situ generated trifluoromethoxide.

Of potential relevance to atmospheric chemistry, tetrafluoromethane hydrolyses to carbonyl fluoride:

CF_{4} + H_{2}O → COF_{2} + 2 HF

Carbonyl fluoride can also be prepared by reaction of phosgene with hydrogen fluoride as well as the fluorination of carbon monoxide, although the latter tends to result in over-fluorination to carbon tetrafluoride. The fluorination of carbon monoxide with silver difluoride is convenient:

CO + 2 AgF_{2} → COF_{2} + 2 AgF

== Reactions ==
Carbonyl fluoride readily hydrolyzes to carbon dioxide and hydrogen fluoride:

COF_{2} + H_{2}O → CO_{2} + 2 HF

When produced in situ, carbonyl fluoride converts carboxylic acids to acyl fluorides:

CF_{2}O + RCO_{2}H → RCOF + HF + CO_{2}

== Safety ==
Carbonyl fluoride is very toxic with a recommended exposure limit of 2 ppm as an 8-hour time weighted average and a 5 ppm as a short-term (15-minute average) exposure, where 1 ppm = 2.70 mg of carbonyl fluoride per 1 m^{3} of air.
