= Hexafluoropropylene =

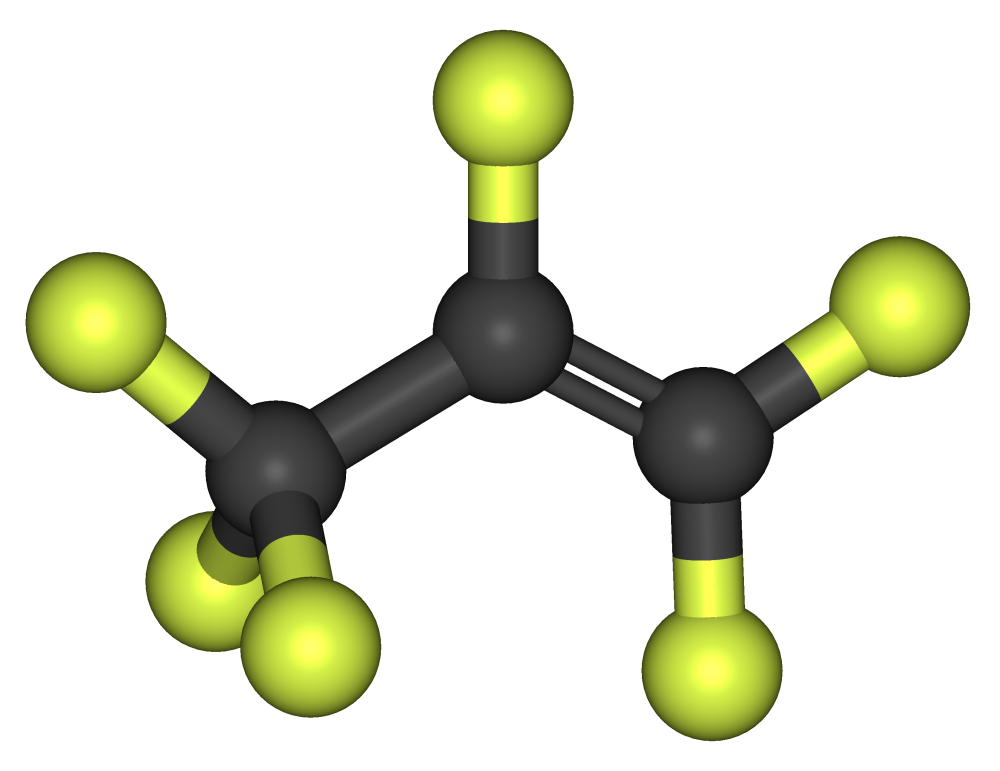

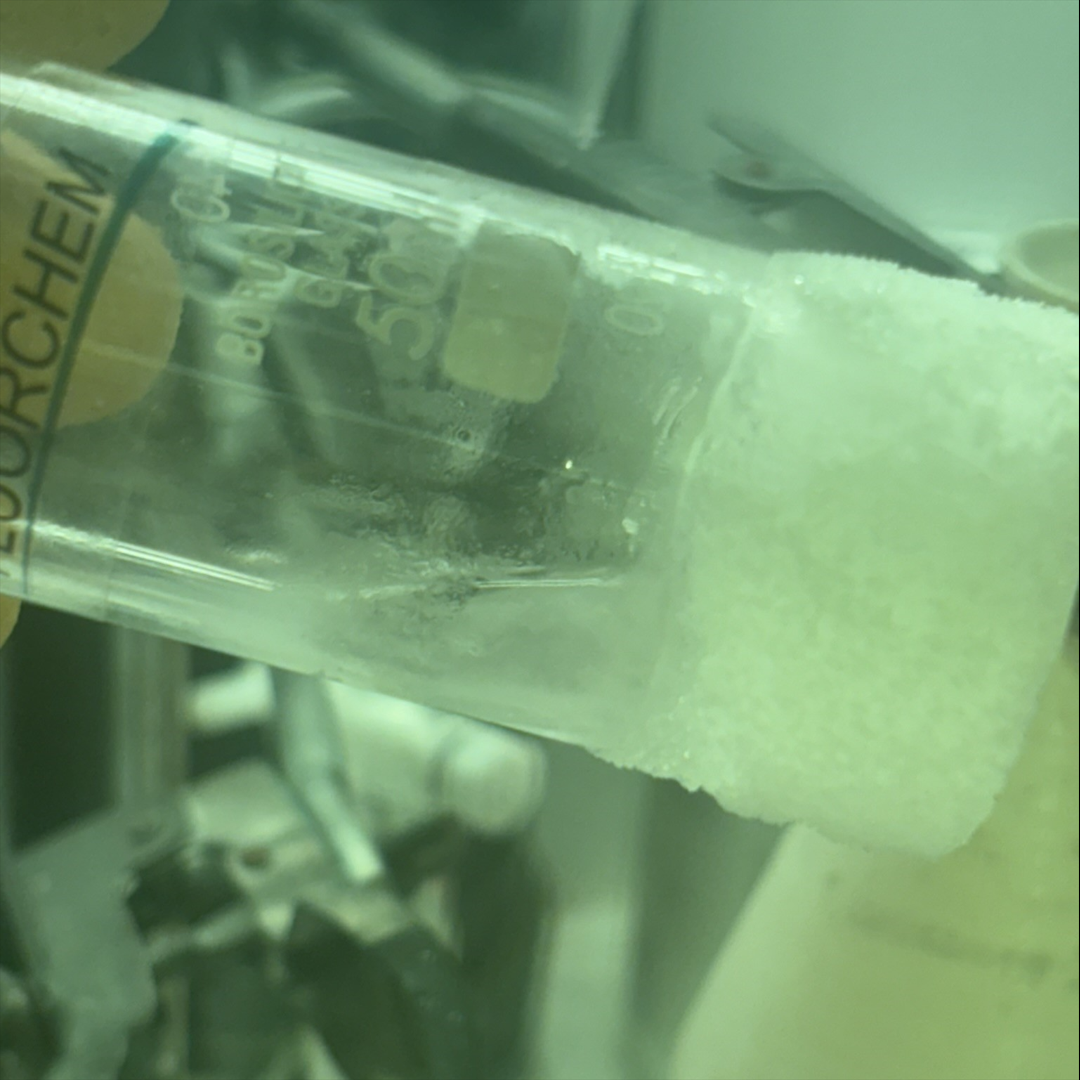

Names
- Preferred IUPAC name 1,1,2,3,3,3-Hexafluoroprop-1-ene
- Other names Perfluoropropene, Perfluoropropylene, freon R 1216, halocarbon R 1216, fluorocarbon 1216

Identifiers
CAS Number	116-15-4
3D model (JSmol)	Interactive image
ChemSpider	8001
ECHA InfoCard	100.003.753
EC Number	204-127-4
PubChem CID	8302
RTECS number	UD0350000
UNII	TRW23XOS20
UN number	1858
CompTox Dashboard (EPA)	DTXSID2026949
- InChI: InChI=1S/C3F6/c4-1(2(5)6)3(7,8)9 Key: HCDGVLDPFQMKDK-UHFFFAOYSA-N; InChI=1/C3F6/c4-1(2(5)6)3(7,8)9 Key: HCDGVLDPFQMKDK-UHFFFAOYAV
- SMILES: F/C(F)=C(/F)C(F)(F)F

Properties
Chemical formula	C_{3}F_{6}
Molar mass	150.023 g·mol^{−1}
Appearance	Colorless, odorless gas
Density	1.332 g/ml, liquid at 20 °C
Melting point	−153 °C (−243 °F; 120 K)
Boiling point	−28 °C (−18 °F; 245 K)
Solubility in water	Insoluble

Hazards
- Occupational safety and health (OHS/OSH)
Main hazards	Suffocation
- GHS labelling
Pictograms	(GHS07: Exclamation mark) (GHS08: Health hazard)
Signal word	Warning
Hazard statements	H332, H335, H351, H371, H373
Precautionary statements	P201, P202, P260, P264, P270, P271, P281, P304+P312, P304+P340, P308+P313, P309+P311, P312, P314, P403+P233, P405, P410+P403, P501
NFPA 704 (fire diamond)	1 0 1
Flash point	Non flammable gas

Related compounds
Related alkenes; organofluorides	propylene; Hexafluoroacetone, Hexafluoro-2-propanol
- Except where otherwise noted, data are given for materials in their standard state (at 25 °C [77 °F], 100 kPa). verify (what is ?) Infobox references

Hexafluoropropylene is the fluoroalkene with the formula CF_{3}CF=CF_{2}. It is the perfluorocarbon counterpart to the hydrocarbon propylene. It is mainly used to produce copolymers with tetrafluoroethylene. Hexafluoropropylene is used as a chemical intermediate.

== Preparation ==
Hexafluoropropylene can be produced by pyrolysis of tetrafluoroethylene:

3 CF_{2}=CF_{2} → 2 CF_{3}CF=CF_{2}

It can also be prepared from chlorodifluoromethane, or produced from various chlorofluorocarbons.
