= Hexafluoro-2-propanol =

1,1,1,3,3,3-Hexafluoro-2-propanol
- 1,1,1,3,3,3-Hexafluoro-2-propanol

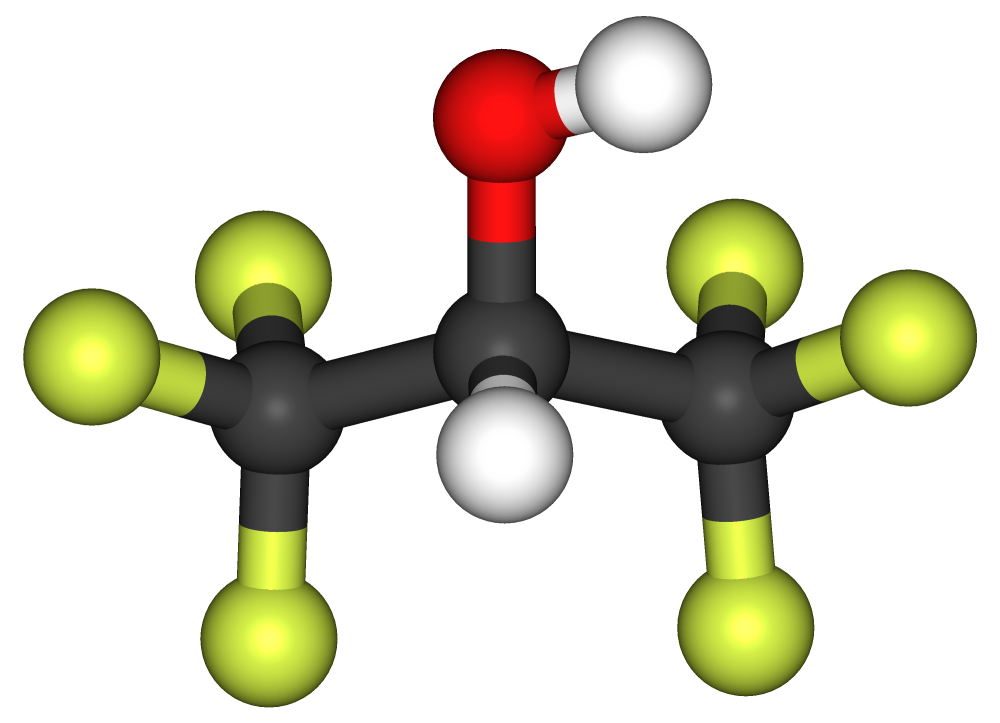

Names
- Preferred IUPAC name 1,1,1,3,3,3-Hexafluoropropan-2-ol
- Other names Hexafluoroisopropanol, Hexafluoroisopropyl alcohol, HFIP

Identifiers
CAS Number	920-66-1
3D model (JSmol)	Interactive image
ChEBI	CHEBI:63104
ChemSpider	12941
ECHA InfoCard	100.011.873
PubChem CID	13529
RTECS number	UB6450000
UNII	3D632GYQ50
CompTox Dashboard (EPA)	DTXSID1022134
- InChI: InChI=1S/C3H2F6O/c4-1(5)2(6,10)3(7,8)9/h1,10H Key: NMFQPFSIPWZZMR-UHFFFAOYSA-N; InChI=1S/C3H2F6O/c4-2(5,6)1(10)3(7,8)9/h1,10H Key: BYEAHWXPCBROCE-UHFFFAOYSA-N
- SMILES: C(C(F)(F)F)(C(F)(F)F)O

Properties
Chemical formula	C_{3}H_{2}F_{6}O
Molar mass	168.038 g·mol^{−1}
Appearance	Colorless liquid
Density	1.596 g/mL
Melting point	−3.3 °C (26.1 °F; 269.8 K)
Boiling point	58.2 °C (136.8 °F; 331.3 K)
Solubility in water	Miscible
Vapor pressure	16 kPa at 20 °C
Viscosity	1.65 cP at 20 °C

Hazards
- GHS labelling
Pictograms	(GHS05: Corrosive) (GHS08: Health hazard)
Signal word	Danger
Hazard statements	H314, H361fd, H373
Precautionary statements	P201, P280, P303+P361+P353, P305+P351+P338+P310, P308+P313
NFPA 704 (fire diamond)	3 0 0
Flash point	> 100 °C (212 °F; 373 K)
Safety data sheet (SDS)	External MSDS

Related compounds
Related Organofluorides; alcohols	Hexafluoroacetone; Isopropyl alcohol, 2,2,2-Trifluoroethanol
- Except where otherwise noted, data are given for materials in their standard state (at 25 °C [77 °F], 100 kPa). verify (what is ?) Infobox references

Hexafluoroisopropanol, commonly abbreviated HFIP, is the organic compound with the formula (CF_{3})_{2}CHOH. This fluoroalcohol finds use as solvent in organic chemistry. Hexafluoro-2-propanol is transparent to UV light with high density, low viscosity and low refractive index. It is a colorless, volatile liquid with a pungent odor.

== Production ==
Hexafluoro-propan-2-ol is prepared from hexafluoropropylene through hexafluoroacetone, which is then hydrogenated.

(CF_{3})_{2}CO + H_{2} → (CF_{3})_{2}CHOH

== Solvent properties ==
As a solvent, hexafluoro-2-propanol is polar and exhibits strong hydrogen bonding properties. Testament to the strength of its hydrogen-bonding tendency is the fact that its 1:1 complex with THF distills near 100 °C. It has a relatively high dielectric constant of 16.7. It is also relatively acidic, with a pKa of 9.3, comparable to that for phenol. It is classified as a hard Lewis acid and its acceptor properties are discussed in the ECW model.

Hexafluoro-propan-2-ol is a speciality solvent for organic synthesis, particularly for reactions involving oxidations and strong electrophiles. For example, HFIP enhances the reactivity of hydrogen peroxide as applied to Baeyer-Villiger oxidation of cyclic ketones. In another illustration of its use, HFIP is used as the solvent for Lewis-acid catalyzed ring opening of epoxides.

It has also found use in biochemistry to solubilize peptides and to monomerize β-sheet protein aggregates. Because of its acidity (pK_{a} = 9.3), it can be used as acid in volatile buffers for ion pair HPLC – mass spectrometry of nucleic acids.

Hexafluoro-propan-2-ol has also been evaluated as a solvent for electrolysis.

== Medicine ==
It is both the precursor and the chief metabolite of the inhalation anesthetic sevoflurane. Sevoflurane gets metabolized within the body into HFIP and formaldehyde. HFIP is inactive, non-genotoxic and once formed, is rapidly conjugated with glucuronic acid and eliminated as a urinary metabolite.

== Safety ==
=== Toxicity ===
Hexafluoro-2-propanol has very low acute toxicity, hence its use as a precursor to anesthetics. Although it has low acute toxicity, it is a strong irritant to skin and eyes. Animal experiments show possible adverse effects on fertility, placing HFIP as a reproductive toxicity category 2 material.

=== Environment and toxicity ===
HFIP is a specialty chemical that is produced in small quantities, thus it is not of significant environmental concern. Its environmental implications have been assessed. HFIP also belongs to per- and polyfluorinated alkyl substances (PFAS).
