= 2,2,2-Trifluoroethanol =

- 2,2,2-Trifluoroethanol

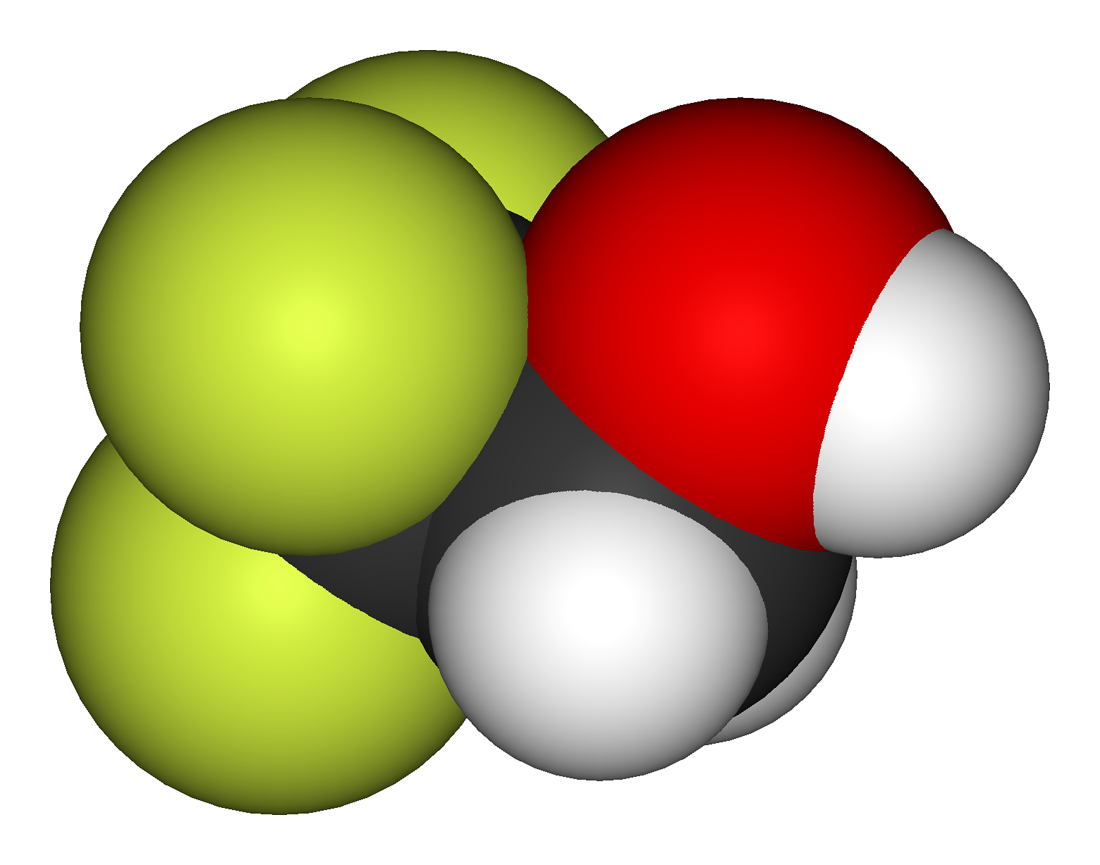
- 2,22-Trifluoroethanol

Names
- Preferred IUPAC name 2,2,2-Trifluoroethan-1-ol
- Other names 2,2,2-Trifluoroethanol

Identifiers
CAS Number	75-89-8
3D model (JSmol)	Interactive image; Interactive image
Beilstein Reference	1733203
ChEBI	CHEBI:42330
ChEMBL	ChEMBL116675
ChemSpider	21106169
DrugBank	DB03226
ECHA InfoCard	100.000.831
EC Number	200-913-6
Gmelin Reference	2532
PubChem CID	6409
UNII	8T8I76KYF1
CompTox Dashboard (EPA)	DTXSID0021751
- InChI: InChI=1S/C2H3F3O/c3-2(4,5)1-6/h6H,1H2 Key: RHQDFWAXVIIEBN-UHFFFAOYSA-N; InChI=1/C2H3F3O/c3-2(4,5)1-6/h6H,1H2 Key: RHQDFWAXVIIEBN-UHFFFAOYAH
- SMILES: OCC(F)(F)F; FC(F)(F)CO

Properties
Chemical formula	C_{2}H_{3}F_{3}O
Molar mass	100.04 g/mol
Appearance	Colorless liquid
Density	1.325±0.06 g/mL @ 20 °C, 760 Torr liquid
Melting point	−43.5 °C (−46.3 °F; 229.7 K)
Boiling point	74.0 °C (165.2 °F; 347.1 K)
Solubility in water	Miscible
Solubility in ethanol	Miscible
Acidity (pK_{a})	12.46±0.10 Most Acidic Temp: 25 °C
Viscosity	0.9 cSt @ 37.78 °C

Thermochemistry
Std enthalpy of combustion (Δ_{c}H^{⦵}_{298})	−886.6 kJ/mol

Hazards
- GHS labelling
Pictograms	(GHS02: Flammable) (GHS05: Corrosive) (GHS06: Toxic) (GHS07: Exclamation mark) (GHS08: Health hazard)
Signal word	Danger
Hazard statements	H226, H301, H312, H315, H318, H331, H332, H335, H360, H373
Precautionary statements	P201, P202, P210, P233, P240, P241, P242, P243, P260, P264, P270, P271, P280, P281, P301+P310, P302+P352, P303+P361+P353, P304+P312, P304+P340, P305+P351+P338, P308+P313, P310, P311, P312, P314, P321, P322, P330, P332+P313, P362, P363, P370+P378, P403+P233, P403+P235, P405, P501
NFPA 704 (fire diamond)	2 3 1

Related compounds
Related alcohols	Hexafluoro-2-propanol
Related compounds	1,1,1-Trifluoroethane; Trifluoroacetic acid
- Except where otherwise noted, data are given for materials in their standard state (at 25 °C [77 °F], 100 kPa). verify (what is ?) Infobox references

2,2,2-Trifluoroethanol is the synthetic organic compound with the formula CF_{3}CH_{2}OH. Also known as TFEA or trifluoroethyl alcohol, this colourless, water-miscible liquid has a smell reminiscent of ethanol. Due to the electronegativity of the trifluoromethyl group, this alcohol exhibits a stronger acidic character compared to ethanol.

== Synthesis ==
Trifluoroethanol is produced industrially by hydrogenation or the hydride reduction of derivatives of trifluoroacetic acid, such as the esters or acyl chloride.

TFEA can also be prepared by hydrogenolysis of compounds of generic formula CF_{3}−CHOH−OR (where R is hydrogen or an alkyl group containing from one to eight carbon atoms), in the presence of a palladium containing catalyst deposited on activated charcoal. As a co-catalyst for this conversion tertiary aliphatic amines like triethylamine are commonly employed.

== Properties ==
Trifluoroethanol is used as a specialized solvent in organic chemistry. Oxidations of sulfur compounds using hydrogen peroxide are effectively conducted in TFEA.

It competitively inhibits alcohol dehydrogenase for example.

TFEA forms complexes with Lewis bases such as THF or pyridine through hydrogen bonding, yielding 1:1 adducts. It is classified as a hard Lewis acid and its acceptor properties are discussed in the ECW model yielding E_{A} = 2.07 and C_{A} = 1.06.

TFEA can be used in biochemical experiments to stabilize alpha helix. There are also stable beta sheets in TFEA, suggesting that TFEA stabilizes the secondary structure the sequence has a preference for.

== Reactions ==
Oxidation of trifluoroethanol yields trifluoroacetic acid. It also serves as a source of the trifluoroethoxy group for various chemical reactions (Still-Gennari modification of HWE reaction).

2,2,2-Trifluoroethyl vinyl ether, an inhaled drug introduced clinically under the tradename Fluoromar, features a vinyl ether of trifluorethanol. This species was prepared by the reaction of trifluoroethanol with acetylene.

Fluorester (2,2,2-trifluoroethyl methacrylate) is an ester of methacrylic acid and TFEA, which can be used as a monomer in specialty paints.

== Safety ==
Trifluoroethanol is classified as toxic to blood, the reproductive system, bladder, brain, upper respiratory tract and eyes. Research has shown it to be a testicular toxicant in rats and dogs.

== See also ==
- Trifluoromethanol
- Pirkle's alcohol, 2,2,2-Trifluoro-1-(9-anthryl)ethanol
