= Stephen O. Andersen =

Canadian businessman

- Born: 17 January 1948 (age 78)

Stephen Oliver Andersen (born 17 January 1948) is the Director of Research at the Institute for Governance & Sustainable Development (IGSD) and former co-chair (1989–2012) of the Montreal Protocol Technology and Economic Assessment Panel (TEAP) where he also chaired and co-chaired Technical Options Committees, Task Forces and Special Reports. He is one of the founders and leading figures in the success of the Montreal Protocol on Substances that Deplete the Ozone Layer (Montreal Protocol) that has phased out the chemicals that deplete the stratospheric ozone that protects the Earth against the harmful effects of ultraviolet radiation that causes skin cancer, cataracts, and suppression of the human immune system, destroys agricultural crops and natural ecosystems and deteriorates the built environment. Because ozone-depleting chemicals are also powerful greenhouse gases the Montreal Protocol also protected climate. Dr. Andersen was instrumental in the 2016 Kigali Amendment that will phase down hydrofluorocarbons once necessary to phase out chlorofluorocarbons (CFCs) fast enough to avoid ozone tipping points, but no longer necessary now that environmentally superior replacements are available or soon to be available. For his ambitious campaign saving the ozone layer, Dr. Andersen earned the 2021 Future of Life Award along with Joe Farman and Susan Solomon.

== Early life ==
Andersen was born in Logan, Utah, United States, the child of a professor of horticulture and a botanist. He studied business administration for two years at Utah State University and then transferred in 1969 to the University of California, Berkeley where he earned B.S., M.S. and Ph.D. degrees in Agricultural and Natural Resources Economics. His PhD dissertation at UC Berkeley was supervised by Drs. Siegfried von Ciriacy-Wantrup, Luther T. "Tim" Wallace, and George Yadigaroglu.

While a graduate student he was a member of the US Department of Transportation "Climatic Impact Assessment Program" (CIAP) assessing the environmental and economic impacts of the decline in northern latitude grain production predicted as a consequence of climate change and depletion of the stratospheric ozone layer.

Andersen began his professional career in 1974 at the Sierra Club Legal Defense Fund (now Earthjustice), where he provided litigation support for cases including energy conservation, forestry, mining, national parks and marine mammal protection. In 1976 he joined the Environmental Law Institute as their first economist working on a series of five books on energy conservation and later on a study with Lisle Baker (Suffolk University Law School) on the Vermont Land Gains Tax (1981).

From 1977 to 1986, Andersen was a professor at College of the Atlantic, Bar Harbor Maine, visiting professor at the University of Hawaii, Manoa, and visiting scholar at Kyoto University.

== Ozone Action ==
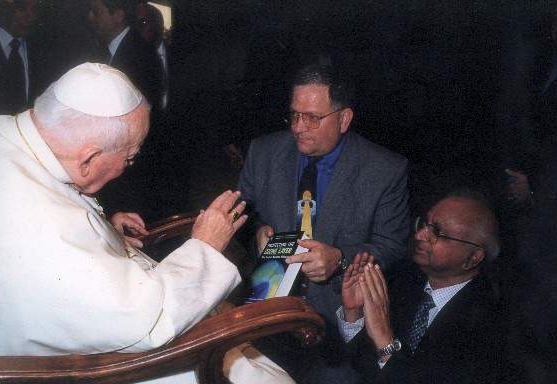
Stephen O. Andersen and Madhava Sarma meeting with the Pope John Paul II in Rome in November 2002

Dr. Andersen is among the longest-serving stratospheric ozone activist, beginning with his participation as co-author in the 1973-1974 assessment of the impact of stratospheric ozone and climate on northern latitude grain production (Schmitz et al., 1975) organized in response to the warning by Professor Paul J. Crutzen on nitrogen oxide emissions that earned him the 1995 Nobel Prize shared by Professors Mario J. Molina and F. Sherwood Rowland.

In 1986, Andersen joined the fledgling US Environmental Protection Agency (EPA) team that built the scientific, technical and economic case for protecting the stratospheric ozone layer. At EPA he rose to deputy director for Stratospheric Ozone Protection and then transferred to the Climate Protection Partnerships Division, where he was Director of Strategic Climate Projects until his retirement from government in 2009.

The timing of Andersen's arrival at EPA was fortuitous. 1987 proved to be a watershed moment in the effort to stop ozone depletion, which increased risks of skin cancer and threatened to wipe out crops and ecosystems, among many adverse impacts. The Montreal Protocol on Substances that Deplete the Ozone Layer was agreed on 16 September 1987 and created a timetable to phase out and eliminate the production of ozone depleting substances.

At EPA, Andersen's responsibilities included analysis of regulatory impact, cost, and trade, technology co-operation, and sector projects in halons, foams, mobile air conditioning, and military uses. Over his tenure he pioneered EPA's voluntary approaches to ozone layer protection including the phase-out of chlorofluorocarbon(CFC) in the manufacturing of food packaging, the recycling of CFC from vehicle air conditioning, the halt to testing and training with halon, and the accelerated CFC solvent phase-out in electronics manufacturing. Andersen also brought Soviet authorities together with NASA scientists and EPA senior officials to gain agreement for US Total Ozone Mapping Spectrometer (TOMS) be carried to space on a Soviet Meteor-3 satellite(1994) rocket in order to overcome loss of access to space (resulting from the Space Shuttle Challenger accident); he founded and managed the first EPA international awards, the US EPA Stratospheric Protection Awards and Climate Protection Awards; and was EPA Liaison to the US Department of Defense (DoD) on stratospheric ozone and climate, chairing several DoD committees on solvent validation, aircraft maintenance, manufacturing rockets without ozone-depleting substances, and certifying the Joint Strike Fighter for particulate emissions.

Whilst at EPA Andersen co-Chaired the 1989 Economic Assessment Panel, the 1989–1997 Solvents Coatings and Adhesives Technical Options Committee, the 1992 Methyl Bromide Assessment and since 1989 co-founded and co-chaired the Technology and Economic Assessment Panel (TEAP). Andersen with K. Madhava Sarma, the first executive director of the Ozone Secretariat and EPA colleague Kristen N. Taddonio, published a two volume history of the Montreal Protocol diplomacy, management, leadership, and technology transfer.

Over the decades, the Montreal Protocol became a victim of its own success. By 2006, some called for dismantling the treaty, claiming it had achieved its goals and outlived its usefulness. Andersen knew the Protocol needed to be not only preserved but strengthened. In 2007 Andersen assembled a team of scientists, led by Dutch scientist Dr. Dr. Guus J.M. Velders, to research the role of the Protocol in climate protection. In 2007 Andersen and the Velders' team published "The Importance of the Montreal Protocol in Protecting Climate." The team quantified the benefits of the Montreal Protocol, and found that it helped prevent 11 billion metric tons of CO_{2}equivalent emissions per year from 1990 to 2010, having delayed the impacts of climate change by 7 – 12 years. The paper determined the Montreal Protocol had been the most successful climate agreement in history, it also estimated the joint ozone and climate benefits of an accelerated hydrochlorofluorocarbons (HCFC) phaseout, providing policymakers with information needed to accelerate the phaseout.

In 2009, Andersen retired from the EPA and joined Durwood Zaelke at the Institute for Governance and Sustainable Development (IGSD) as director of research, where he has continued in his pursuit of ozone and climate protection. In 2009, Andersen and the Velders' team published their second paper "The Large Contribution of Projected HFC Emissions to Future Climate Forcing", which used future HFC production and consumption scenarios to show that without new controls, HFC emissions lead to substantial climate warming by the middle of the 21st century. The two Velders papers helped build the foundation that inspired other scientists to calculate and communicate the interlinkages of ozone with climate and the importance of phasing out ODSs and phasing-down HFCs.

Andersen's research and work at IGSD, and over his career, culminated on 15 October 2016 when the Parties to the Montreal Protocol agreed to the Kigali Amendment, an amendment to the Protocol for the inclusion and regulation of HFCs. The Kigali Amendment will limit warming from HFCs to 0.06 °C, avoiding nearly 0.5 °C of warming by 2100 and 80 Gt CO_{2}e by 2050.

Andersen now concentrates on achieving the HFC phasedown as quickly as feasible with higher energy efficiency at affordable prices, while stopping the dumping of technically inferior appliances, and narrowing the Montreal Protocol exemption for feedstocks used to produce plastics that pollute oceans, rivers and land with hazardous and toxic waste. He is also part of the team using government procurement to purchase super-efficient room ACs at an affordable price around the world, using the Life Cycle Climate Performance (LCCP) method to evaluate the carbon footprint and global warming impact of heating, ventilation, air conditioning (AC) and refrigeration systems, and of the team demonstrating secondary-loop motor vehicle air conditioning.

Stephen is featured in the PBS Documentary "Saving the Ozone Layer: How We Saved the Planet" along with scientists Sherwood Rowland and Mario Molina, politicians Ronald Reagan and Margaret Thatcher, scientists Paul Newman and Mack McFarland and NGO Presidents David Doniger and Durwood Zaelke, aired 10 April 2019.

For his critical contribution to saving the ozone layer, Andersen was a winner of the 2021 Future of Life Award along with Joe Farman and Susan Solomon. Professor Ted Parson from the UCLA Emmett Institute on Climate Change and the Environment said, "for over a decade, Andersen brilliantly led the Montreal Protocol's Technology and Economic Assessment Panel process. Andersen made the Montreal Protocol happen." Emphasizing the importance of the Montreal Protocol, Astronomer Royal Martin Rees added, "in the face of threats to humanity's future, we need to be thinking globally, rationally and long-term, empowered by technology. The story and success of the Montreal Protocol shows us that this is possible." Dr. Jim Hansen, former Director of the NASA Goddard Institute for Space Studies and Director of Columbia University's Program on Climate Science, Awareness and Solutions said, "in Farman, Solomon and Andersen we see the tremendous impact individuals can have not only on the course of human history, but on the course of our planet's history. My hope is that others like them will emerge in today's battle against climate change."

In 2022 Stephen was featured in Jean Oelwang's new book: Partnering: Forge the Deep Connections that Make Great Things Happen as one of the cadre of environmental activists working for the United Nations and governments who protected the stratospheric ozone layer while simultaneously reducing climate forcing emissions more than any other climate treaty to date.

For recovering stratospheric ozone from the planetary boundary danger zone to the path to recovery to pre-industrial health Stephen earned the Planetary Guardians Award along with D. Suely M. Carvalho, Marco Gonzalez, Professor Mario J. Molina, Professor. F. Sherwood Rowland, Jonathan Shanklin, and Dr. Helen Tope.

Andersen was the principal investigator and lead author of the publication inventing the legal framework to stop the dumping in developing countries of inefficient cooling equipment using obsolete ozone-depleting and climate-forcing refrigerants that motivated Decisions to the Parties to the Montreal Protocol for shared responsibility in making available high efficiency cooling with climate friendly refrigerants at fair prices and profits. He also served as the lead author of the scientific and policy publication documenting that ODS and GHG feedstocks allowed under a Montreal Protocol feedstock exemption are used to produce plastics that poison workers and communities, pollute fresh water, oceans, land, and atmosphere with plastic waste and "everywhere and forever" chemicals such as trifluoroacetic acid (TFA) and per- and poly-fluoroalkyl substances (PFAS).

== Honors ==
- 2023 Planetary Guardians Award - "For recovering stratospheric ozone from the planetary boundary danger zone to the path to recovery to pre-industrial health."
- 2021 Future of Life Award - "For Critical Contribution to Saving the Ozone Layer"
- 2020 SAE International Environmental Excellence in Transportation (E2T)- For "Greener Auto Air Conditioner to Save the World."
- 2019 California Air Resources Board Haggen-Smit Policy Award- For "lifetime achievement in stratospheric ozone and climate protection with clean air co-benefits."
- 2017 United Nations Environment Policy and Implementation Leadership Award - "For Lifetime Contributions as an Architect and Implementer of the Montreal Protocol."
- 2017 United Nations Environment 2017 Scientific Leadership Team Award - "For Building and Communicating the Scientific Foundation for the 2007 acceleration of the HCFC Phaseout and the 2016 Kigali Amendment and Decision to phase down HFCs and increase energy efficiency." (Earned with John S. Daniel, David W. Fahey, Marco Gonzalez, Mack McFarland, Guus J.M. Velders, and Durwood Zaelke).
- 2012 US Environmental Protection Agency Level III Scientific and Technological Achievement Award - "For a Substantial Revision of a Scientific Procedure for Assessing Ozone and Trifluoroacetic Impacts of Refrigerants."
- 2008 Service to America Career Achievement Medal - "For Over 35 Years of Public Service for the Environment."
- 2007 Nobel Peace Prize – Awarded to the Intergovernmental Panel on Climate Change (IPCC) and former US Vice President Albert Gore Jr [Stephen O. Andersen served as Special Report co-chair].
- 2007 United Nations Environment Programme Best New Scientific Publication 20thAnniversary of the Montreal Protocol - "For the Importance of the Montreal Protocol in Protecting Climate", published in the Proceedings of the National Academy of Sciences (Earned with Guus J. M. Velders, John S. Daniel, David W. Fahey and Mack McFarland).
- 2007 US Environmental Protection Agency Stratospheric Protection Award - "For Climate Co-Benefits of the Montreal Protocol Science Team."
- 2007 United Nations Environmental Programme Montreal Protocol Visionaries Award - "For His Tireless Energies Over 20 Years for Ozone Layer Protection."
- 2007 United Nations Environmental Programme Technology and Economic Assessment Panel Champion Award - "For Leadership and Prolific Efforts Around the Globe to Achieve an Early Phase-Out of Ozone-Depleting Substances."
- 1998 United Nations Environment Programme Global 500 Roll of Honour - "For Outstanding Contribution to the Protection of the Environment."
- 1987 US EPA Gold Medal - "For Outstanding Service in the Development and Implementation of Strategies for Addressing Problems of Stratospheric Ozone Depletion."

== Bibliography ==
- Andersen, Stephen O.; Gonzalez, Marco (2023). 35th Anniversary Protecting the Ozone Layer (2nd ed.). ISBN 979-8-218-09933-6.
- Agyarko, Kofi; Andersen, Stephen; Ferris, Richard; Zan, Hubert; Osae-Quansah, Emmanuel; Dreyfus, Gabrielle; Derder, Mohamed; Bosire, Leslie; Bloomer, Laura; Sun, Xiaopu (25 March 2022). "The Importance of Stopping Environmental Dumping in Ghana: The Case of Inefficient New and Used Cooling Appliances With Obsolete Refrigerants". Duke Environmental Law & Policy Forum. 32 (1): 51–106.
- Andersen, Stephen O.; Gonzalez, Marco; Sherman, Nancy J. (18 October 2022). "Setting the Stage for Climate Action Under the Montreal Protocol". Eos. 103. doi:10.1029/2022EO220496.
- Hillbrand, Alex; Madan, Prima; Singh, Manjeet; McNamara, Marie; Andersen, Stephen O.; Mathur, Ajay; Shende, Rajendra; Jaiswal, Anjali (2022). "Scenarios for future Indian HFC demand compared to the Kigali Amendment". Environmental Research Letters. 17 (7). Bibcode:2022ERL....17g4019H. doi:10.1088/1748-9326/ac7538.
- Andersen, Stephen O.; Gao, Song; Carvalho, Suely; Ferris, Tad; Gonzalez, Marco; Sherman, Nancy J.; Wei, Yiyao; Zaelke, Durwood (2021). "Narrowing feedstock exemptions under the Montreal Protocol has multiple environmental benefits". Proceedings of the National Academy of Sciences. 118 (49) e2022668118. Bibcode:2021PNAS..11822668A. doi:10.1073/pnas.2022668118. PMC 8665836. PMID 34845018.
- Willi, Kathryn; Ravishankara, A. R.; Velders, Guus J. M.; Daniel, John S.; McFarland, Mack; Andersen, Stephen O. (2021). "The Precautionary Principle and the Environment: A Case Study of an Immediate Global Response to the Molina and Rowland Warning". ACS Earth and Space Chemistry. 5 (11): 3036–3044. Bibcode:2021ESC.....5.3036W. doi:10.1021/acsearthspacechem.1c00244.
- "A Comprehensive Review of Life Cycle Climate Performance for Air Conditioning Systems". International Journal of Refrigeration. doi:10.1016/j.ijrefrig.2021.06.026.
- Miller, Allan; Zaelke, Durwood; Andersen, Stephen O. (2021). Resetting Our Future: Cut the Super Climate Pollutants, Now!. Changemakers Books. ISBN 978-1-78904-834-6.
- Andersen, Stephen O.; Ferris, Richard; Picolotti, Romina; Zaelke, Durwood; Carvalho, Suely; Gonzalez, Marco (2018). "Defining the Legal and Policy Framework to Stop the Dumping of Environmentally Harmful Products". Duke Environmental Law & Policy Forum. 29 (1): 1–48.
- Andersen, Stephen O.; Sherman, Nancy J.; Carvalho, Suely; Gonzalez, Marco (2018). "The Global Search and Commercialization of Alternatives and Substitutes for Ozone-Depleting Substances". Geoscience. 350 (7): 410–424. Bibcode:2018CRGeo.350..410A. doi:10.1016/j.crte.2018.07.010.
- Andersen, Stephen O. (2017). "We Can and Must Govern Climate Engineering". World View. Nature. 551 (7681): 415. doi:10.1038/d41586-017-07296-4. PMID 29168836.
- Seidel, Stephen; Ye, Jason; Andersen, Stephen O.; Hillbrand, Alex (2016). "Not-In-Kind Alternatives to High Global Warming HFCs". Center for Climate and Energy Solutions.
- Sherry, David; Nolan, Maria; Seidel, Stephen; Andersen, Stephen O. (2016). "HFO-1234yf: An Examination of Projected Long-Term Costs of Production". Center for Climate and Energy Solutions.
- Andersen, Stephen O.; Brack, Duncan; Depledge, Joanna (2014). "A global Response to HFCs through Fair and Effective Ozone and Climate Policies" (PDF). Chatham House.
- Montzka, Stephen A.; McFarland, Mack; Andersen, Stephen O.; Miller, Benjamin R.; Fahey, David W; Hall, Bradley D.; Hu, Lei; Carolina, Siso; Elkins, James W. (2014). "Recent Trends in Global Emissions of Hydrochlorofluorocarbons and Hydrofluorocarbons—Reflecting on the 2007 Adjustment to the Montreal Protocol". Journal of Physical Chemistry. 119 (19): 4439–4449. doi:10.1021/jp5097376. PMID 25405363.
- Andersen, Stephen O.; Halberstadt, Marcel L.; Borgford-Parnell, Nathan (2013). "Stratospheric Ozone, Global Warming, and the Principle of Unintended Consequences—An Ongoing Science and Policy Success Story". Journal of the Air & Waste Management Association. 63 (6): 607–647. Bibcode:2013JAWMA..63..607A. doi:10.1080/10962247.2013.791349. eISSN 2162-2906. PMID 23858990.
- Zaelke, Durwood; Andersen, Stephen O.; Borgford-Parnell, Nathan (2012). "Strengthening Ambition for Climate Mitigation: The Role of the Montreal Protocol in Reducing Short-lived Climate Pollutants". Review of European Community & International Environmental Law. 21 (3): 231–242. doi:10.1111/reel.12010.
- Luecken, Deborah J.; Waterland, Robert L.; Papasavva, Stella; Taddonio, Kristen N.; Hutzell, William T.; Rugh, John P.; Andersen, Stephen O. (2010). "Ozone and TFA Impacts in North America from Degradation of 2,3,3,3-Tetrafluoropropene (HFO-1234yf), A Potential Greenhouse Gas Replacement". Environ. Sci. Technol. 44 (1): 343–348. Bibcode:2010EnST...44..343L. doi:10.1021/es902481f. PMID 19994849.
- Andersen, Stephen O.; Velders, Guus J.M.; Canan, Penelope (2009). "How Science Guides Industry Choice of Alternatives to Ozone-Depleting Substances". In Zerefos, Christos; Contopoulos, Georgios; Skalkeas, Gregory (eds.). Twenty Years of Ozone Decline: Proceedings of the Symposium for the 20th Anniversary of the Montreal Protocol. Springer Science. pp. 407–428. doi:10.1007/978-90-481-2469-5_31. ISBN 978-90-481-2468-8.
- Molina, Mario; Zaelke, Durwood; Sarma, K. Madhava; Andersen, Stephen O.; Ramanathan, Veerabhadran; Kaniaru, Donald (2009). "Reducing Abrupt Climate Change Risk Using the Montreal Protocol and Other Regulatory Actions to Complement Cuts in CO2 Emissions". Proceedings of the National Academy of Sciences. 106 (49): 20616–20621. doi:10.1073/pnas.0902568106. PMC 2791591. PMID 19822751.
- Velders, Guus J.M.; Fahey, David W.; Daniel, John S.; MacFarland, Mack; Andersen, Stephen O. (2009). "The Large Contribution of Projected HFC Emissions to Future Climate Forcing". Proceedings of the National Academy of Sciences. 106 (27): 10949–10954. Bibcode:2009PNAS..10610949V. doi:10.1073/pnas.0902817106. PMC 2700150. PMID 19549868.
- Andersen, Stephen O.; Sarma, K. Madhava; Taddonio, Kristen N. (2007). Technology Transfer for the Ozone Layer: Lessons for Climate Change. London: Earthscan Press. (Official publication of the Global Environment Facility (GEF) and the United Nations Environment Programme).
- Velders, Guus J.M.; Andersen, Stephen O.; Daniel, John S.; Fahey, David W.; MacFarland, Mack (2007). "The Importance of the Montreal Protocol in Protecting the Climate". Proceedings of the National Academy of Sciences. 104 (12): 4814–4819. Bibcode:2007PNAS..104.4814V. doi:10.1073/pnas.0610328104. PMC 1817831. PMID 17360370.
- Andersen, Stephen O.; Zaelke, Durwood (2003). Industry Genius: Inventions and People Protecting the Climate and Fragile Ozone Layer. London: Greenleaf Press.
- Andersen, Stephen O.; Sarma, K. Madhava (2002). Protecting the Ozone Layer: The United Nations History. London: Earthscan Press. (Official publication of the United Nations Environment Programme).
- Ciriacy-Wantrup, S. V.; Bishop, Richard C.; Andersen, Stephen O. (1986). Natural Resource Economics: Selected Papers.
- Baker, R. Lisle; Andersen, Stephen O. (1981). "Taxing Speculative Land Gains: The Vermont Experience. Urban Law Annual". Journal of Urban and Contemporary Law. 22.
- Andersen, Stephen O.; Anderson, Robert C.; Searles, Barbara J. (1978). "The Tuna–Porpoise Dilemma: Is Conflict Resolution Attainable?". Natural Resources Journal. 18 (3): 505–519. JSTOR 24881606.
