= K. Madhava Sarma =

- Born: 8 July 1938; Krishna District, Andhra Pradesh, India
- Died: 30 September 2010 (aged 72); Vellore, Tamil Nadu, India
- Education: Andhra University; Indian Statistical Institute
- Occupation: Indian Administrative Service
- Known for: First Executive Secretary of the Vienna Convention for the Protection of the Ozone Layer and the Montreal Protocol on Substances that Deplete the Ozone Layer (1991-2000)
- Relatives: raghuram nephew Maternal
- Awards: US EPA Stratospheric Ozone Protection Award (1996); Special Vienna Convention Award for Ozone Layer Protection (2005); UNEP Montreal Protocol Visionaries Award (2007); US EPA Best-of-the-Best Stratospheric Ozone Protection Award (2007)

K. Madhava Sarma (1938-2010) was the first Executive Secretary of the Vienna Convention for the Protection of the Ozone Layer and the Montreal Protocol on Substances that Deplete the Ozone Layer (Ozone Secretariat) from 1991 to 2000 at the United Nations Environment Programme (UNEP). He is considered one of the founders and leading figures in the success of the Montreal Protocol that established legally binding controls on the production and consumption of chemicals that cause ozone depletion and damage the stratospheric ozone layer which protects the Earth against the harmful effects of ultraviolet radiation. These effects include skin cancer, sunburn, permanent blindness and cataracts as well as harm to plants and animals. The Montreal Protocol was recognized by Kofi Annan, former Secretary General of the United Nations as being “perhaps the single most successful international environmental agreement to date" and went on to become the first treaty in the history of the United Nations to be universally ratified in 2008 by 197 countries.

Since the inception of the Montreal Protocol in 1987, 98% of Ozone Depleting Substances have been phased out. Most Ozone Depleting Substances are also potent greenhouse gases and hence the Protocol also contributes to reduced global warming.

== Early life, education and career ==
K. Madhava Sarma was born in Krishna district, Andhra Pradesh State on July 8, 1938. He was the fourth of nine siblings and his father was a mathematics teacher. After his schooling in Vijayawada he graduated from the Mathematics Honours program at Andhra University in Vishakapatnam in 1957 with a BSc and MSc in Mathematics. He then studied at the Indian Statistical Institute (ISI) in Kolkata and graduated with an MSc. in Planning and Econometrics in 1959.

Sarma wrote the Indian Administrative Service(IAS) Civil Services Examination and was successfully inducted into the 1962 batch of the IAS for the state of Tamil Nadu.

He started his career as trainee Assistant Collector, Tirunelveli district and then as Sub- Collector of Tuticorin district. Over the next two decades he served as Collector of the districts of Cuddalore and Tirunelveli, Commissioner of Madurai Municipal Corporation, Managing Director of the Tamil Nadu Water Supply and Drainage Board, Secretary to the Government of Tamil Nadu Public Works Department and Special Officer, Chennai Corporation. In 1986 Sarma moved to New Delhi to serve as Joint Secretary and then as Additional Secretary in the Ministry of Environment and Forests of the Government of India.

== Ozone Action ==
Sarma was a member of the Intergovernmental Panel on Climate Change and represented India in the negotiations leading to the London Amendment of the Montreal Protocol in 1990. The London Amendment included the establishment of the Multilateral Fund, the financial mechanism that would enable developing country participation towards enforceable obligations to protect the ozone layer. In 1991 Sarma was appointed to be the Executive Secretary of the Vienna Convention for the Protection of the Ozone Layer and the Montreal Protocol on Substances that Deplete the Ozone Layer (Ozone Secretariat).

=== Ozone Secretariat ===
During Sarma's nine-year tenure as Executive Secretary of the Montreal Protocol from 1991-2000, the Protocol was amended and adjusted to place more stringent controls on halon source gases known to cause ozone depletion grew to well over 150 parties. The Amendment of 1997 created a system of licensing, and the Protocol has stringent reporting, monitoring and verification requirements for 96 ozone-depleting chemicals.

=== Strengthening Montreal Protocol and Lessons for Climate Change ===
In 2000, following his retirement from the executive position at the Ozone Secretariat, the Parties to the Montreal Protocol appointed Sarma as a Senior Expert Member of the Technology and Economic Assessment Panel (TEAP). He was also a member of the Technology and Finance Committee on Montreal Protocol of the Government of India. In 2002, he co-authored (with Stephen O. Andersen) 'Protecting the Ozone Layer: The United Nations History’ – the definitive and comprehensive chronicle of events and processes that helped save the ozone layer.

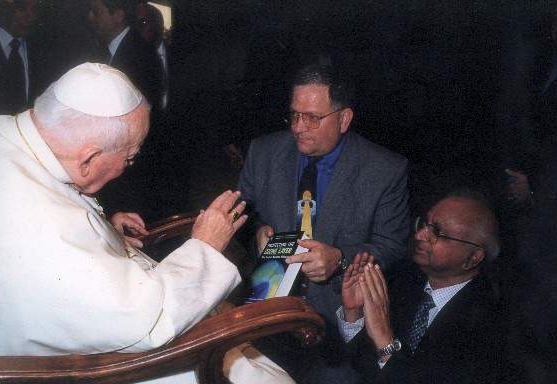
K. Madhava Sarma and Stephen O. Andersen meeting with Pope John Paul II in Rome in November 2002 (Stephen O. Andersen)

In 2007, on the 20th Anniversary of the Montreal Protocol, the Parties agreed to accelerate the phase-out of hydrochlorofluorocarbons (HCFCs) – chemicals which are ozone-depleting substances (ODSs) as well as potent greenhouse gases and to amend the Montreal Protocol to control the HFCs which were once necessary substitutes for ODSs, but were no longer needed because environmentally superior technology became available.

In 2007 he co-authored (with Stephen O. Andersen and Kristen N. Taddonio) 'Technology Transfer for the Ozone Layer: Lessons for Climate Change' that assessed over 1000 technology transfer projects of the Montreal Protocol and identified lessons that can be applied towards climate change.

In 2009, Sarma collaborated with Nobel Laureate Mario Molina, Durwood Zaelke, Stephen O. Andersen, Veerabhadran Ramanathan & Donald Kaniaru on a paper that laid out the strategy to focus on climate mitigation using existing laws and institutions "Reducing abrupt climate change risk using the Montreal Protocol and other regulatory actions to complement cuts in CO2 emissions." On 15 October 2016, the parties to the Montreal Protocol signed an amendment in Kigali. They agreed to phase down the production and usage of hydrofluorocarbons (HFCs), which could prevent up to 0.5 °C (0.9 °F) of global warming by 2100, and continue to protect the ozone layer.

== Later life ==
Sarma served as trustee secretary of the board of trustees of the Chennai Mathematical Institute (CMI) from 2003 to 2010. CMI was founded in 1989 by Professor C.S. Seshadri and a team of mathematicians as part of the SPIC Science Foundation. Sarma managed reforms including restructuring and government approval of corporate donations as well as identifying and purchasing a building site and supervising the design and construction of the new campus. As a result of these efforts, in October 2005 CMI moved to its new campus at Siruseri, on the southern outskirts of Chennai and in December 2006 was recognized by the Government of India as a University under Section 3 of the UGC Act, 1956. The CMI has instituted the annual K. Madhava Sarma Memorial Distinguished Lecture in memory of his contributions to the Institute.

== Personal life ==
K. Madhava Sarma married Ramalakshmi in 1964 and had three daughters and three grandchildren. He died on September 30, 2010, in Vellore following a brief illness.

== Honors ==
- 1995 United Nations Environment Programme Award for Extraordinary Contributions to Ozone Layer Protection: Given on the 10th Anniversary of the Vienna Convention for the Protection of the Ozone Layer for "extraordinary contributions to the success of ozone layer protection."
- 1996 US Environmental Protection Agency (EPA) Stratospheric Ozone Protection Award: For "exceptional leadership, personal dedication and technical achievements in eliminating Ozone Depleting Substances."
- 2005 Special Vienna Convention Award for Ozone Layer Protection: For "exceptional dedication and outstanding contribution to the protection of the ozone layer."
- 2007 United Nations Environment Programme Montreal Protocol Visionaries Award: For "leading the Protocol through its growth years from 1991 to 2000 and enabling the Parties to negotiate a virtual phase-out of almost all substances controlled under the Montreal Protocol."
- 2007 United Nations Environment Programme Technology and Economic Assessment Panel (TEAP) Champion Award: For having served as "valued representative of and advisor to India."
- 2007 US Environmental Protection Agency (EPA) Best-of-the-Best Stratospheric Ozone Protection Award: Presented to 52 awardees around the world, selected from the list of over 500 EPA annual Ozone Awardees from 1990 through 2007 for having "demonstrated ingenuity, leadership and public service by improving environmental performance, reducing and eliminating emissions of ozone depleting substances, and strengthening national and Montreal Protocol policies."

== Bibliography ==
- Sarma, Madhava K. (July 28, 1998). "Protection of the Ozone Layer - A Success Story of UNEP". Linkages Journal (International Institute for Sustainable Development Reporting Services). 3 (3).
- Andersen, Stephen O.; Sarma, Madhava K. (2002). Protecting the Ozone Layer: The United Nations History. London: Earthscan Press. ISBN 978-1853839054.
- Sarma, Madhava K. (2005). "Lessons for Developing Countries from the Ozone Agreements". In Low, Pak Sum (ed.). Climate Change and Africa. Cambridge University Press. pp. 319–325. doi:10.1017/CBO9780511535864. ISBN 9780521029957.
- Sarma, Madhava K. (2005). "Compliance with the Montreal Protocol". In Zaelke, Durwood; Kaniaru, Donald; Kuzikova, Eva (eds.). Making Law Work: Environmental Compliance and Sustainable Development Vol. 1. Cameron May. pp. 287–306.
- Sarma, Madhava K. (2006). "Compliance With The Multilateral Environmental Agreements To Protect The Ozone Layer". In Beyerlin, U.; Stoll, P.; Wolfrum, R. (eds.). Ensuring Compliance with Multilateral Environmental Agreements. A Dialogue between Practitioners and Academia. Martinus Nijhoff Publishers. ISBN 90-04-14617-2.
- Sarma, Madhava K.; Andersen, Stephen O. (May 2007). "II. Dynamic evolution: technology, assessment, and funding. 4.Industry response to the Montreal Protocol: what a difference a treaty makes!". In Kaniaru, Donald (ed.). The Montreal Protocol: celebrating 20 years of environmental progress: ozone layer and climate protection. Cameron. ISBN 978-1905017515. OCLC 181359781.
- Sarma, Madhava K.; Andersen, Stephen O.; Taddonio, Kristen N. (May 2007). "Lessons from the success of the Montreal Protocol". In Kaniaru, Donald (ed.). The Montreal Protocol: celebrating 20 years of environmental progress: ozone layer and climate protection. Cameron. ISBN 978-1905017515. OCLC 181359781.
- Sarma, Madhava K. (May 2007). "Strengthening the Montreal Protocol: the step-by-step approach for the Montreal Protocol". In Kaniaru, Donald (ed.). The Montreal Protocol: celebrating 20 years of environmental progress: ozone layer and climate protection. Cameron. pp. 203–13. ISBN 978-1905017515. OCLC 181359781.
- Andersen, Stephen O.; Sarma, Madhava K.; Taddonio, Kristen N. (2007). Technology Transfer for the Ozone Layer: Lessons for Climate Change. London: Earthscan Press. ISBN 9781844074730.
- Sarma, Madhava K.; Molina, Mario (13 September 2007). "Greenhouse gas cuts - the lessons of ozone". Financial Times. The Financial Times Limited.
- Sarma, Madhava K. "Technology Transfer Mechanism for Climate Change" (Draft). Institute for Governance and Sustainable Development.
- Sarma, Madhava K.; Zaelke, Durwood (June 27, 2008). "Start, then Strengthen: The Importance of Immediate Action for Climate Mitigation". Multilateral Environmental Agreements (MEA) Bulletin (Guest Article No. 50). International Institute for Sustainable Development (IISD).
- Molina, Mario, Durwood Zaelke, K. Madhava Sarma, Stephen O. Andersen, Veerabhadran Ramanathan and Donald Kaniaru, 2009. "Reducing Abrupt Climate Change Risk Using the Montreal Protocol and Other Regulatory Actions to Complement Cuts in CO2 Emissions," Proceedings of the National Academy of Sciences;;, 106:20616-20621.
- Sarma, K. M.; Taddonio, K. N. (2009). "The Role of Financial Assistance by the Multilateral Fund in Technology Change to Protect the Ozone Layer". In Zerefos, C.; Contopoulos, G.; Skalkeas, G. (eds.). Twenty Years of Ozone Decline. Springer, Dordrecht. pp. 441–458. doi:10.1007/978-90-481-2469-5_34. ISBN 978-90-481-2469-5.
- Sarma, Madhava K.; Andersen, Stephen O.; Zaelke, Durwood; Taddonio, Kristen N. (2009). "Ozone Layer, International Protection". In Wolfrum, Rudiger (ed.). Max Planck Encyclopedias of International Law [MPIL] (2012 ed.). Max Planck Foundation for International Peace and the Rule of Law.
- Andersen, Stephen O.; Sarma, Madhava K. Doniger, David (ed.). "Making Climate Change and Ozone Treaties Work Together to Curb HFC-23 and Other "Super Greenhouse Gases"" (PDF). NRDC Issue Paper (November 2010).
- Sarma, K. M.; Andersen, Stephen O. (2011). "Science and Diplomacy: Montreal Protocol on Substances the Deplete the Ozone Layer". In Berkman, Paul Arthur; Lang, Michael A.; Walton, David W. H.; Young, Oran R. (eds.). Science Diplomacy: Antarctica, Science, and the Governance of International Spaces. Smithsonian Contributions to Knowledge. pp. 123–131. doi:10.5479/si.9781935623069.123. ISBN 9781935623069.
