= University of California, Irvine School of Physical Sciences =

Academic unit

Coordinates: 33.64454°N 117.84420°W

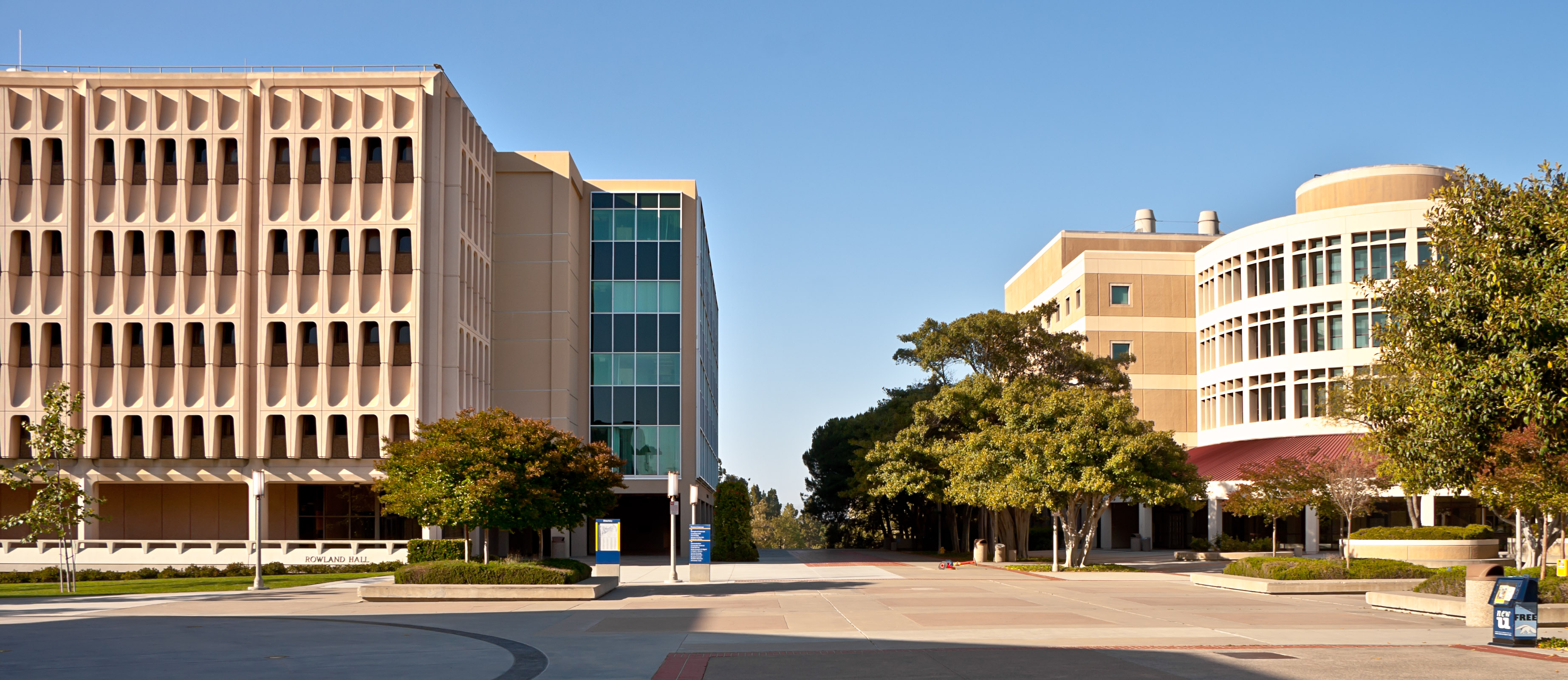
The Physical Sciences plaza at UC Irvine, with Rowland Hall on the left and Reines Hall on the right. The buildings are named after UCI faculty and Nobel Prize winners F. Sherwood Rowland and Frederick Reines

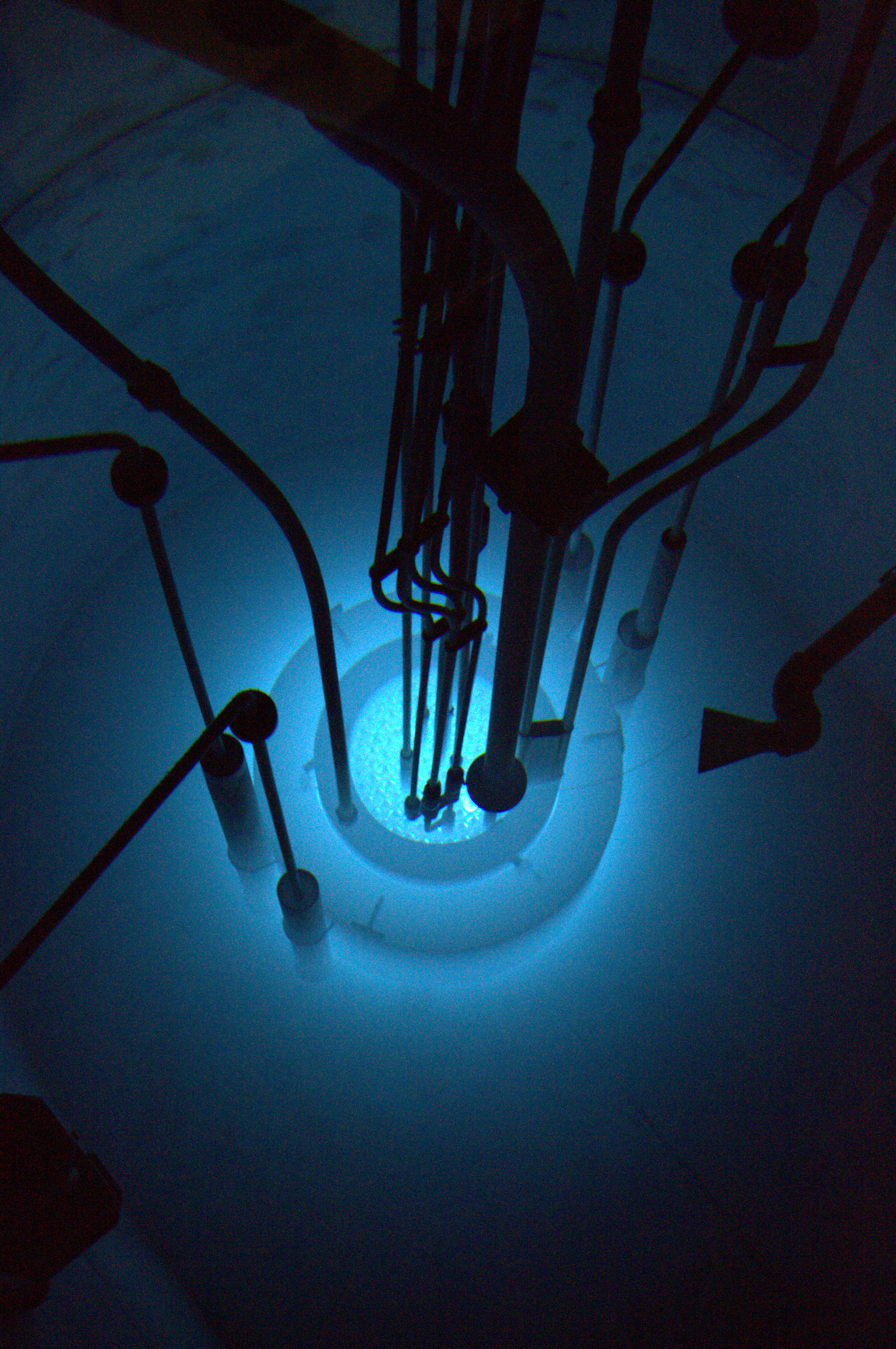
UCI Nuclear Reactor Facility, which is part of the Chemistry Department. It is a General Atomics Mark 1 TRIGA operational since 1969. The reactor is located in the basement of Rowland Hall.

The School of Physical Sciences is an academic unit of the University of California, Irvine (UCI) that conducts academic research and teaching in the field of physical sciences. It offers both pre-professional training and general education in the departments of chemistry, earth system science, mathematics, and physics and astronomy. The school enrolls 1,400 undergraduate and graduate students and is one of the top schools in the nation in the number of degrees it confers in the area of physical sciences. It also offers specializations such as biochemistry, statistics, math for economics, applied and computational mathematics, astrophysics, applied physics, biomedical physics, and education. In 1995, the school gained international prominence when Frank Sherwood Rowland, a professor in chemistry and Frederick Reines, a professor in physics, won the Nobel Prize in their respective fields. It was the first time two people won the prize in the same year in two different fields at the same public university.

== History ==
The School of Physical Sciences was established in 1965, as one of the founding schools of the University of California, Irvine.

== Departments ==
- Physics and Astronomy
- Mathematics
- Chemistry
- Earth System Science

== Programs and degrees ==
There were 1208 Undergraduate students and 516 Graduate students as of Fall 2014.

=== Degrees conferred ===
All four departments confer Bachelor of Science, Master of Science, and Doctor of Philosophy degrees.

=== Undergraduate ===
The school possesses 5 undergraduate majors, each providing either a Bachelor of Science degree or a Bachelor of Arts degree. The majors that are available are chemistry, earth system science, environmental science, mathematics, and physics.

=== Graduate ===
The School of Physical Sciences provides 1 masters level graduate program in chemistry and 4 doctorate level graduate programs, including programs in chemistry, mathematics, physics and astronomy, and earth system science.

The Department of Chemistry offers Ph.D. degrees in all major sub-disciplines of chemistry, along with several interdisciplinary programs. These programs include analytical chemistry, atmospheric chemistry, chemical biology, inorganic chemistry, organic chemistry, physical chemistry, theoretical chemistry, chemicals and materials physics, and medicinal chemistry and pharmacology. As of fall 2014, there were about 40 faculty members, 240 graduate students, and 50 postdoctoral fellows in the chemistry program. There is also a master's degree program in chemistry offered, along with a master's degree program in chemistry with a teaching credential.

The Department of Mathematics offers a Ph.D. degree in mathematics as well as a master's degree in mathematics. As of fall 2014, there were about 36 faculty members and 100 graduate students.

The Department of Physics and Astronomy offers both Ph.D and master's degrees in physics, as well as an interdisciplinary degree in chemical and material physics.

The Department of Earth System Science offers a Ph.D. degree program in earth system science.

== Associated bodies ==
=== UCI Math Circle ===
UCI Math Cicle
- Logo of the UCI Math Circle
- Parent institution: UCI Department of Mathematics
- Established: 2012
- Mission: Mathematics outreach to the community promoting inclusive excellence in mathematics.
- Focus: Mathematics youth education
- Head: Alexandra Pantano
- Faculty: List: Li-Sheng Tseng; Alessandra Pantano; John Treuer; Yasmeen Baki; Andrei Mandelshtam
- Key people: List: John Palacios; Luke Smith
- Location: Irvine, California, California, United States
- Website: www.math.uci.edu/~mathcircle/index.html

The UCI Math Circle is an institution operating under the Department of Mathematics. The UCI Math Circle, like many others, is oriented towards developing mathematical skills and thinking in youth populations.

The UCI Math circle covers numerous topics such as Number theory, Graph theory, Topology, Statistics, Combinatorics, functional equations. These topics are often taught in sessions through games and analogies to the real world, professors from various institutions may also come and speak at certain sessions.

=== Student organizations ===
The American Chemical Society Student Affiliates is the student-run Chemistry Club at UCI. It provides academic and career guidance to undergraduates, as well as opportunities to meet and interact with guests or professors from the field of Chemistry.

The Anteaters Mathematics Club is the student-run Mathematics Club at UCI. It provides weekly guest lectures from professors, graduate students, or others in the field of Mathematics. The Anteaters Math Club also provides a quarterly panel with Mathematics professionals for a Q&A with students.

The UCI Earth System Club is a student-run club based on Earth System Science. The club provides students with information regarding the Earth System Science major as well as networking opportunities.

The Society of Physics Students at UC Irvine is UCI's chapter of the Society of Physics Students. The club conducts and organizes events to help students develop interest in physics, as well as providing areas for study.

The Astronomy Club at UCI is a student-run club based on Astronomy. The club provides students with opportunities to meet other students interested in astronomy, and often utilizes the UCI Observatory as well as the grounds of Aldrich Park for stargazing.

== Nobel faculty ==
=== Frank Sherwood Rowland ===
Frank Sherwood Rowland was one of the original professors for the University of California, Irvine and became the first Chairman of the Chemistry Department in August 1964. He retired from his Chairman position five years later, but by 1973 Rowland changed his research focus from radiochemistry to atmospheric chemistry. In 1995, atmospheric chemist Rowland, along with his colleague Mario Molina received the Nobel Prize in chemistry for predicting and then proving that the ozone layer was being depleted by chlorofluorocarbons, common compounds found in aerosol sprays of the time. He continued to research their chemical effects on the environment.

=== Frederick Reines ===
Dr. Frederick Reines (1918-1998) along with his colleague Clyde Cowan in 1956 developed a method to detect, and confirmed the existence of, the neutrino, one of the most elusive subatomic particles. When he became the founding Dean of Physical Sciences of the University of California, Irvine in 1966 he brought his research along with him. In 1974 Reines stepped down as Dean in order to focus on his research and teaching as a professor. Their discovery of the neutrino eventually led to Reines and his colleague receiving the 1995 Nobel Prize in Physics. As a faculty member for UCI he received the Distinguished Faculty Lecturer Award in 1979 and the Medal for Outstanding Research in 1985, predating his Nobel Prize.

=== Irwin Rose ===
Irwin Rose was a researcher within the School of Medicine but did extensive collaboration with the School of Physical Sciences. In 1997, Rose moved to the facilities in UCI while sharing a space with Ralph Bradshaw. Dr. Rose, along with colleagues at the Israel Institute of Technology discovered a major pathway in the body which proteins are regulated by degradation. Because ubiquitin is an important molecule that impacts cell growth and division, malfunctions or improper breakdowns of ubiquitin causes diseases such as cancer and cystic fibrosis. In 2004, Dr. Rose received a Nobel Prize in the field of Chemistry for his discoveries. Since then, he received the Nobel Laureate Parking Permit at UCI, which gives him free parking for a lifetime.

=== Other Notable Faculty ===
==== Chemistry ====
- Don Blake
- James Pitts
- Bill Evans

==== Earth System Science ====
- Ralph Cicerone

==== Mathematics ====
- Karl Rubin

==== Physics ====
- Gregory Benford
- Liu Chen
