= Durwood Zaelke =

American environmentalist

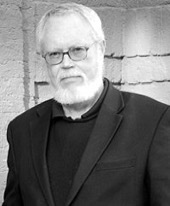
- Born: 15 May 1947 (age 79)
- Education: University of California, Los Angeles (BA) Duke University School of Law (J.D.)
- Occupation: International Environmental Lawyer
- Spouse: Barbara L. Shaw (1976-2013)

Durwood Zaelke (born 15 May 1947) is an American environmental litigator, professor, author, and advocate. As President and founder of the Institute for Governance & Sustainable Development (IGSD) in Washington, D.C., and Paris, he currently focuses on fast mitigation strategies to protect the climate, including strategies to reduce short-lived climate pollutants (HFCs, black carbon, ground level ozone, methane), in the context of the need for speed to limit anthropogenic warming to 1.5 °C.

At the Department of Justice during the early stages of his career, he helped to develop a strong basis of US environmental law prior to becoming one of the pioneers of international environmental law, notably in working to reduce ozone depletion and climate pollution by strengthening the Montreal Protocol. He co-authored the standard English language textbook on international environmental law and policy, founded the international environmental law program at American University, and co-founded the program on governance for sustainable development at the University of California, Santa Barbara's Bren School.

== Education and early career ==
Zaelke was born in Sioux Falls, South Dakota, and grew up in California. He attended the University of California, Los Angeles and the University of California, Berkeley, and received a BA from University of California, LA in 1969 and a J.D. from Duke University School of Law in 1972, where he was an editor of the Duke Law Journal. He is a member of the bar in California, the District of Columbia, and Alaska.

Zaelke began his legal career as the acting Editor-in-Chief of the Environmental Law Reporter at the Environmental Law Institute (ELI) after graduating law school. At ELI he also worked with Frederick R. Anderson on NEPA in the Courts: A Legal Analysis of the National Environmental Policy Act (Resources for the Future, 1973). Later that year, Zaelke joined Adams, Duque & Hazeltine in Los Angeles as an associate (1973–1974). Zaelke returned to the Environmental Law Institute in 1975 where he focused on the need for energy conservation during the OPEC oil embargo.

== Career ==
=== 1978–1980: Special Litigation Attorney, U.S. Department of Justice ===
In 1978, Zaelke joined the Department of Justice (DOJ) in what is now the Environment and Natural Resources Division. He was one of the three founding attorneys in a new section of the Justice Department—the Policy, Legislation, and Special Litigation section within the Environment Division.

During his tenure at the DOJ, Zaelke designed the federal government's initial hazardous waste enforcement strategy. He led the investigation into several of the initial cases including the Justice-EPA investigation of hazardous waste dumping at Love Canal by Hooker Chemical Company, which was ultimately settled for $129 million, and helped pave the way for the Superfund law enacted in 1980. In 1979 Zaelke led the Department's investigation into the accident at the Three Mile Island Nuclear Generating Station.

=== 1980–1989: Senior Attorney, Sierra Club Legal Defense Fund ===
Zaelke left the DOJ and headed north to Alaska in May 1980 to serve as the director and senior attorney for the Alaska office of the Sierra Club Legal Defense Fund (SCLDF) (now Earthjustice). His orders from Rick Sutherland, the Executive Director of SCLDF, were to show that cases could be won in Alaska – or to shut down the office in six months.

One of his initial cases blocked what would have been the world's largest open pit molybdenum mine by Rio Tinto - Zinc Corporation in Misty Fjords National Monument, which would have dumped 60,000 tons of toxic tailings a day into the pristine waters of the fjord and its rich salmon streams. Zaelke's work helped conserve important resources in the Tongass National Forest, Admiralty Island National Monument, the Kodiak National Wildlife Refuge, among others. He also worked closely with the Tlingit village of Angoon on Admiralty Island, the last remaining traditional Tlingit village in the world, helping protect Angoon's traditional subsistence hunting lands from clear cut logging.

After returning from Alaska, Zaelke directed the Washington, D.C., office of the Sierra Club Legal Defense Fund and founded their international program.

=== 1989–2003: Founder and President, CIEL ===
While still at SCLDF, Zaelke was asked by Sebia Hawkins, then heading the South Pacific Campaign for Greenpeace, to investigate litigation against Japan for whaling, only to find that no action could be brought by an NGO in the International Court of Justice. He found international environmental law a pale shadow of the national law he was used to and set out with his colleagues to change this by starting a movement modeled after the public interest environmental law movement in the US.

In 1989, Zaelke co-founded the Center for International Environmental Law (CIEL) in Washington, D.C., and London, with his late wife Barbara L. Shaw, James Cameron, Philippe Sands and Wendy Dinner. CIEL is a public interest environmental law firm dedicated to strengthening and developing international and comparative environmental law, policy, and management throughout the world.

In 1990, Zaelke and Cameron identified opportunities for low-lying island States to protect their territory and population from sea-level rise and to ensure full and equitable participation in developing climate policy, including through the just-starting UN negotiations and through the judicial process, including by way of a request for an advisory opinion from the International Court of Justice: “The goal would be an opinion from the Court on the governing principles in international law affecting the states responsible for, and victims of, sea-level rise and other consequences of global warming.” In July 2025, the ICJ issued an Advisory Opinion on the Obligations of States in Respect of Climate Change, based on an initiative from low-lying States led by law student from Vanuatu. At the Second World Climate Conference in 1990, Zaelke and the other CIEL founders assisted in the creation of the Alliance of Small Island States (AOSIS).

In 1992, Zaelke and CIEL Law Fellow Chris Wold recommended an independent inspection panel for the newly-constituted European Bank for Reconstruction and Development, which became the model for the 23 inspection panels today, developed under the leadership of CIEL Staff Attorney David Hunter. In 1994, Zaelke testified about the need for the World Bank Inspection Panel before the U.S. House of Representatives, and he and Hunter submitted written testimony.

While serving as president of CIEL, Zaelke accepted an appointment as director of the International Network for Environmental Compliance and Enforcement (INECE), a global network of 4,000 environmental enforcement practitioners in over 150 countries, dedicated to raising awareness of compliance and enforcement across the regulatory cycle; developing networks for enforcement cooperation; and strengthening capacity to implement and enforce environmental requirements.

=== Since 2003: Founder and President, IGSD ===
In 2003, Zaelke left CIEL and founded the Institute for Governance & Sustainable Development (IGSD), dedicated to applying the lessons of good governance to improve sustainable development, at all levels of government, as well as within the private sector. For more than a decade, Zaelke has led IGSD's fast-action mitigation program, which was first described in Mario Molina, Durwood Zaelke, Veerabhadran Ramanathan, Stephen O. Andersen, & Donald Kaniaru, Reducing abrupt climate change risk using the Montreal Protocol and other regulatory actions to complement cuts in CO_{2} emissions (2009), Proceedings of the National Academy of Sciences. He continued his role with INECE until 2015.

At Zaelke's helm, IGSD is working to strengthen the climate mitigation potential of the Montreal Protocol on Substances that Deplete the Ozone Layer by reducing hydrofluorocarbons (HFCs), a harmful short-lived climate pollutant primarily used in refrigerants, through research, building awareness and global negotiating. Zaelke and his colleagues contributed to the scientific foundation for these efforts by co-authoring several papers, including several in the Proceedings of the National Academy of Sciences (2007) and (2009), the Review of European Compliance & International Environmental Law, Atmospheric Chemistry and Physics, among others.

Zaelke and IGSD's work for the better part of a decade leading a campaign to phase down HFCs culminated on 15 October 2016 when the Parties to the Montreal Protocol agreed to adopt the Kigali Amendment to the Montreal Protocol to phase down HFCs. A global phasedown of HFCs could avoid up to 0.5 °C of warming by 2100, with the initial schedule of the Kigali Amendment capturing about 90% of this potential, and can capture the rest with an accelerated schedule, or leapfrog strategy. Considerably more warming can be avoided from fast implementation and parallel efforts to improve energy efficiency of air conditioners and other cooling equipment. The Montreal Protocol's 2018 quadrennial Scientific Assessment of Ozone Depletion confirmed that beyond phasing down HFCs, improving the energy efficiency of air conditioners and other cooling equipment has the potential to double the climate benefits of the Kigali Amendment in the near-term. IGSD continues work to promote the ratification and implementation of the Kigali Amendment and improvements to energy efficiency equipment to achieve the full suite of climate benefits available.

At IGSD Zaelke also works to mitigate air pollution and other short-lived climate pollutants, including methane. Reducing methane emissions is essential for slowing warming this decade to limit temperatures to 1.5 °C and can avoid nearly 0.3 °C by 2040s, according to the recent Global Methane Assessment from the United Nations Environment Programme and the Climate & Clean Air Coalition (expert reviewed by IGSD). Following the Global Methane Assessment and the launch of the Global Methane Pledge at COP26, Zaelke is promoting the need for a global methane agreement, inspired by the Montreal Protocol and borrowing some of the architecture from the successful Montreal Protocol on Substances that Deplete the Ozone Layer.

In 2022 Zaelke was recognized by Washingtonian Magazine as one of the 16 most influential people for climate and environment, among Washington, D.C.'s 500 most influential people.

== Writing and commentary ==
Zaelke is the author, co-author, and editor of several books, publications, and commentaries.

In his 1993 article, Making Trade and Environmental Policies Mutually Reinforcing: Forging Competitive Sustainability, Zaelke proposed the concept of "competitive sustainability" with co-author Robert Z. Housman, defined as "mechanisms for achieving sustainable development by harmonizing domestic and international environmental standards through the use of competitive forces which reward the cleanest and most efficient economic actors." Housman and Zaelke explained that a "mutually reinforcing mechanism of incentives and disincentives at the international level would direct trade and environmental policies to attain sustainability goals. They also proposed that countries could coordinate and provide an "upward harmonization" of domestic and international environmental standards, with resulting effects of higher environmental and social protection."

He is co-author of the standard English language textbook on international environmental law and policy, International Environmental Law and Policy, Foundation Press 6th ed. 2022 (co-authored with David Hunter and James Salzman), and Cut Super Climate Pollutants Now! The Ozone Treaty's Urgent Lessons for Speeding Up Climate Action, 2021, Changemakers Books (co-authored with Alan Miller and Dr. Stephen. O. Andersen).

Zaelke co-chaired, with Nobel Laureate Mario J. Molina, the International Energy Agency (IEA) and UN Environment Program (UNEP) Cooling Emissions and Policy Synthesis Report (2020) and the underlying assessment of the report, the Assessment of Climate and Development Benefits of Efficient and Climate-Friendly Cooling (2020), authored under the guidance of a Steering Committee of leading scholars and government, think tank, and independent experts.

Zaelke also co-chaired with Nobel Laureate Mario J. Molina, and Professor V. Ramanathan at the University of California, San Diego, the Well Under 2 Degrees Celsius: Fast Action Policies to Protect People and the Planet from Extreme Climate Change report (2017), which identified scalable solutions to achieve rapid climate stability, authored by a team of 33 prominent scientists and policy experts. He contributed to the University of California's climate change textbook, Bending the Curve: Climate Change Solutions (with Professor V. Ramanathan and J. Cole), and a chapter on fluorinated gasses for ELI's Legal Pathways to Deep Decarbonization in the United States (2019) (with N. Borgford- Parnell, & Dr. S. O. Andersen).

He has also authored and co-authored many Op-Eds in leading publications including, The San Diego Union-Tribune, The Hill, Project Syndicate, The New York Times,, among others.

== Teaching ==
Zaelke has taught various environmental courses and programs nationally and abroad including:

- 1990–2004: American University Washington College of Law, where he was the founder and co-director of the International & Comparative Environmental Law Program, and designed and taught a series of courses relating to international environmental law and policy;
- 1992: University of Nairobi/Widener summer program in Kenya, teaching International Environmental Law;
- 1994: Duke Law School/Free University of Brussels summer program, teaching International Environmental Law and Policy;
- 1996–2013: American University's Summer Law Program in Paris and Geneva, co-founder, teaching International Environmental Institutions;
- 2000: Yale Law School, Visiting Lecturer, teaching International Environmental Law & Policy;
- 2003: Johns Hopkins University, teaching International Environmental Policy;
- Since 2003: University of California, Santa Barbara, Bren School of Environmental Science & Management, co-founder and co-director of the School's Program on Governance for Sustainable Development.

== Honors ==
=== 2022 Washington, D.C.'s 500 Most Influential People ===
Washingtonian Magazine's list of the experts and advocates, outside the government, who are playing big roles in Washington's policy debates. Recognized for his efforts in climate and environment.

=== 2020 Beyond Duke Service and Leadership Award (Duke University) ===
Awarded to "recognize alumni who have distinguished themselves through service to their community, their country or to society at large."

=== 2017 UN Ozone Political Leadership Award ===
Awarded for "extraordinary contributions in the development and implementation of the Montreal Protocol resulting in the successful phase-out of controlled substances or negotiations".

=== 2017 UN Ozone Scientific Leadership Award ===
Awarded for "building and communicating the scientific foundation for the 2007 acceleration of the HCFC phaseout and the 2016 Kigali Amendment Kigali and decision to phase down HFCs and increase energy efficiency." Earned as part of the "Guus Velders' Team," led by Dutch scientist Dr. Guus Velders, who conducted pioneering research on the climate benefits of the Montreal Protocol, building the foundation for the Kigali Amendment, shared with John S. Daniel, David W. Fahey, Marco Gonzalez, Mack McFarland, Guus J.M. Velders, and Stephen O. Andersen.

=== 2016 People to Watch, Environment & Energy Publishing, Special Series ===
Awarded to "key players on energy and environmental policy, people to watch this year in U.S. climate debates."

=== 2009 CIEL International Environmental Law Award ===
Awarded for "having made outstanding contributions to the effort to achieve solutions to environmental problems through international law and institutions." Award shared with James Cameron, Wendy Dinner, Philippe Sands, and Barbara Lee Shaw.

=== 2008 EPA Climate Protection Award & Stratospheric Ozone Protection Award ===
Awarded for "outstanding efforts to protect the Earth's climate and stratospheric ozone layer." Awards shared with research fellow Scott Stone. Zaelke and Stone were the only awardees to receive both an award for climate protection and an award for ozone protection.

=== 2007 Law Alumni Association's Charles S. Murphy Award (Duke University School of Law) ===
Awarded to graduates "who have devoted their careers to public service or education."

== Personal life ==
On 24 December 1976, Zaelke married Barbara Lee Shaw (1943 to 2013), who co-founded CIEL and IGSD, and in 2000 founded the Maasai Girls Education Fund (MGEF) in Kenya and the U.S. which she directed until her death in 2013. Zaelke remains a member of MGEF's board of directors. Zaelke has two children and six grandchildren.
