= Gustavus Esselen =

American chemist

- Born: 1888; Boston, Massachusetts, U.S.
- Died: 1952 (aged 63–64)
- Education: Harvard University
- Military career
- Service: U.S. Army
- Rank: Reserve Officer; Committee Chairman
- Units: Chemical Warfare Service; Scientific Research and Development

Gustavus John Esselen (1888–1952) was an American chemist notable for his work with anhydride curing agent development and improving polyvinyl butyral for commercialized laminated glass. During his career, he was part of the American Chemical Society (ACS) for 43 years, serving in roles including chairman of the Northeastern Section and councilor and director of the national organization. He was also chairman of the American Section of the Society of Chemical Industry between 1919 and 1951.

== Biography ==
Born in Roxbury, Boston, Massachusetts, Esselen studied at Harvard University where he was awarded the A.B. (magna cum laude) in chemistry in 1909 and a doctorate in 1912. Until 1921 he was a member of the research staff of General Electric and then of Arthur D. Little. There with Little and Wallace Murray he contrived to make a 'silk' purse from reconstituted collagen extracted from a sow's ear. In 1930 he founded Gustavus J. Esselen, Inc., which, following a merger, became Esselen Research Division of United States Testing Co., Inc.

Among the successful projects for industrial clients he was involved with was the development of anhydride curing agents for epoxy resins and polyvinyl butyral as an improved material for the subsequent commercialization of laminated glass for use in vehicles etc. More than 40 U.S. patents were issued as a result of his research efforts.

Esselen was a member of the American Chemical Society for 43 years, twice chairman of the Northeastern Section (1922–23) and served as councilor and director of the national organization. From 1919 to 1951 he was chairman of the American Section of the Society of Chemical Industry. Prior to World War II he was a reserve officer in the U.S. Army's Chemical Warfare Service. During the war he was a committee chairman with the Office of Scientific Research and Development.

== Esselen Award ==
In 1987, the American Chemical Society established the Esselen Award in his honor.

The Esselen Award for Chemistry in the public interest is one of the most prestigious honors provided by the Northeastern Section of the ACS. The award of $5,000 annually recognizes "a chemist whose scientific and technical work has contributed to the public well-being, and has thereby communicated positive values of the chemical profession." Notable recipients include F. Sherwood Rowland, Mario Molina, Bruce Ames, Kyriacos C. Nicolaou, Robert S. Langer, Joseph M. DeSimone, Jean Fréchet, Ronald Breslow and Bruce Roth. The 2011 winner was Arthur J. Nozik.
