= Kigali Amendment =

International agreement (2016) to reduce the use of hydrofluorocarbons

Kigali Amendment to the Montreal Protocol
- _ Ratified, accepted or approved
- Type: Environmental protection agreement
- Context: Montreal Protocol (1985)
- Signed: October 15, 2016
- Location: Kigali, Rwanda
- Effective: January 1, 2019
- Parties: 175

The Kigali Amendment to the Montreal Protocol is an international agreement to gradually reduce the consumption and production of hydrofluorocarbons (HFCs). It is a legally binding agreement designed to create rights and obligations in international law.

The Montreal Protocol was originally created to preserve and restore the ozone layer; participating countries agreed to phase out chlorofluorocarbons (CFCs), gases that had been causing ozone depletion. HFCs do not contain chlorine, so they do not cause ozone depletion, and therefore have been replacing CFCs under the Protocol. However, HFCs are powerful greenhouse gases that contribute to climate change, so this amendment adds HFCs to the list of chemicals that participating countries promise to phase down.

As of 8 April 2026, 174 states and the European Union have ratified the Kigali Amendment.

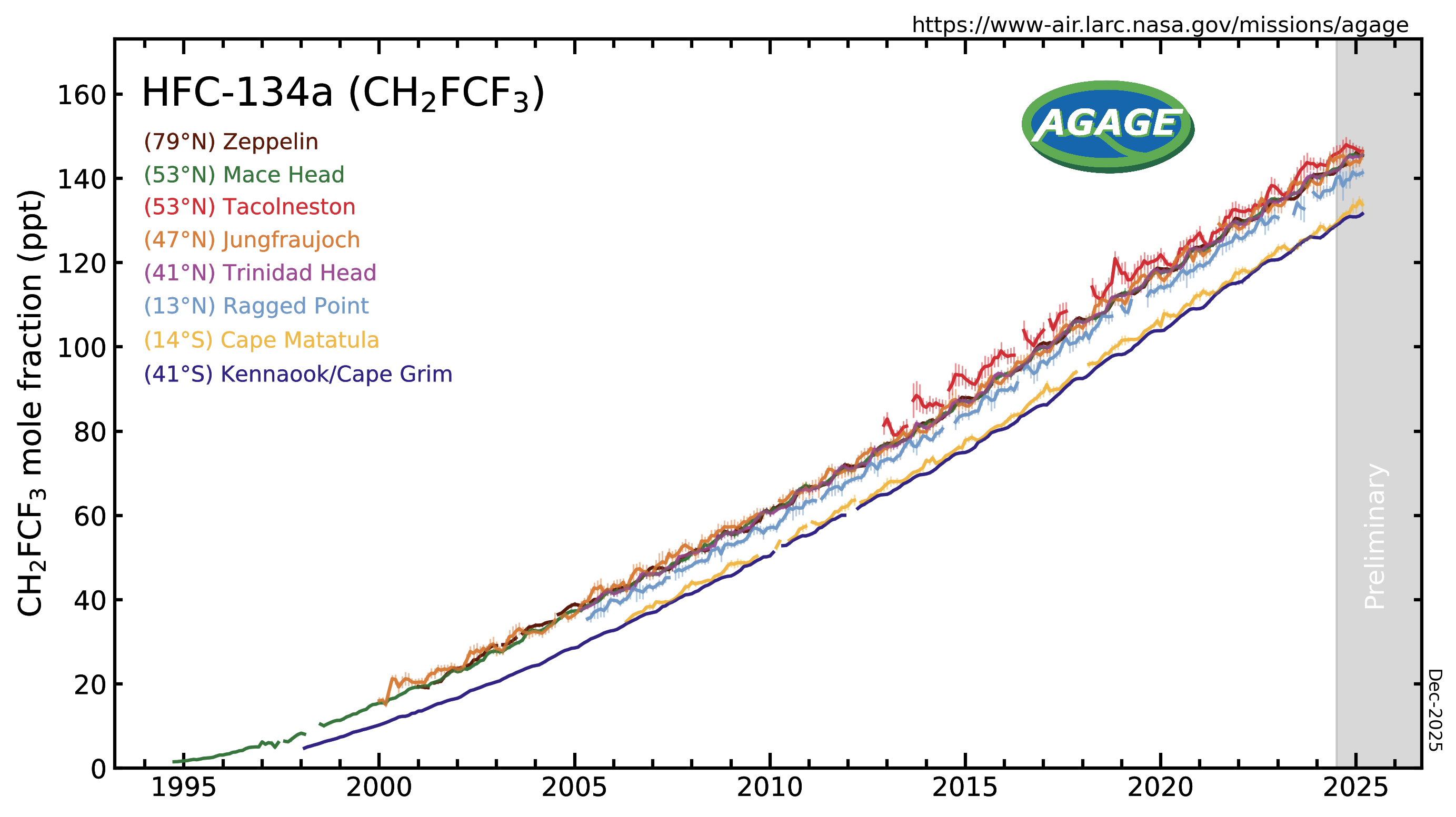
The concentration of HFCs in the atmosphere at weather stations around the world.

== Background ==
Many industrial products, including refrigerants and other cooling services, use HFCs.

Originally, chlorofluorocarbons (CFCs) were used in these applications, but the deleterious effect of these gases on the ozone layer was revealed in 1974 by Paul J. Crutzen, Mario Molina, and F. Sherwood Rowland. The Montreal Protocol was signed in 1987 by the 20 major CFC producers and came into effect in 1989; since 1987, all 197 member states of the United Nations, among others, have ratified the Protocol. HFCs have since largely replaced CFCs.

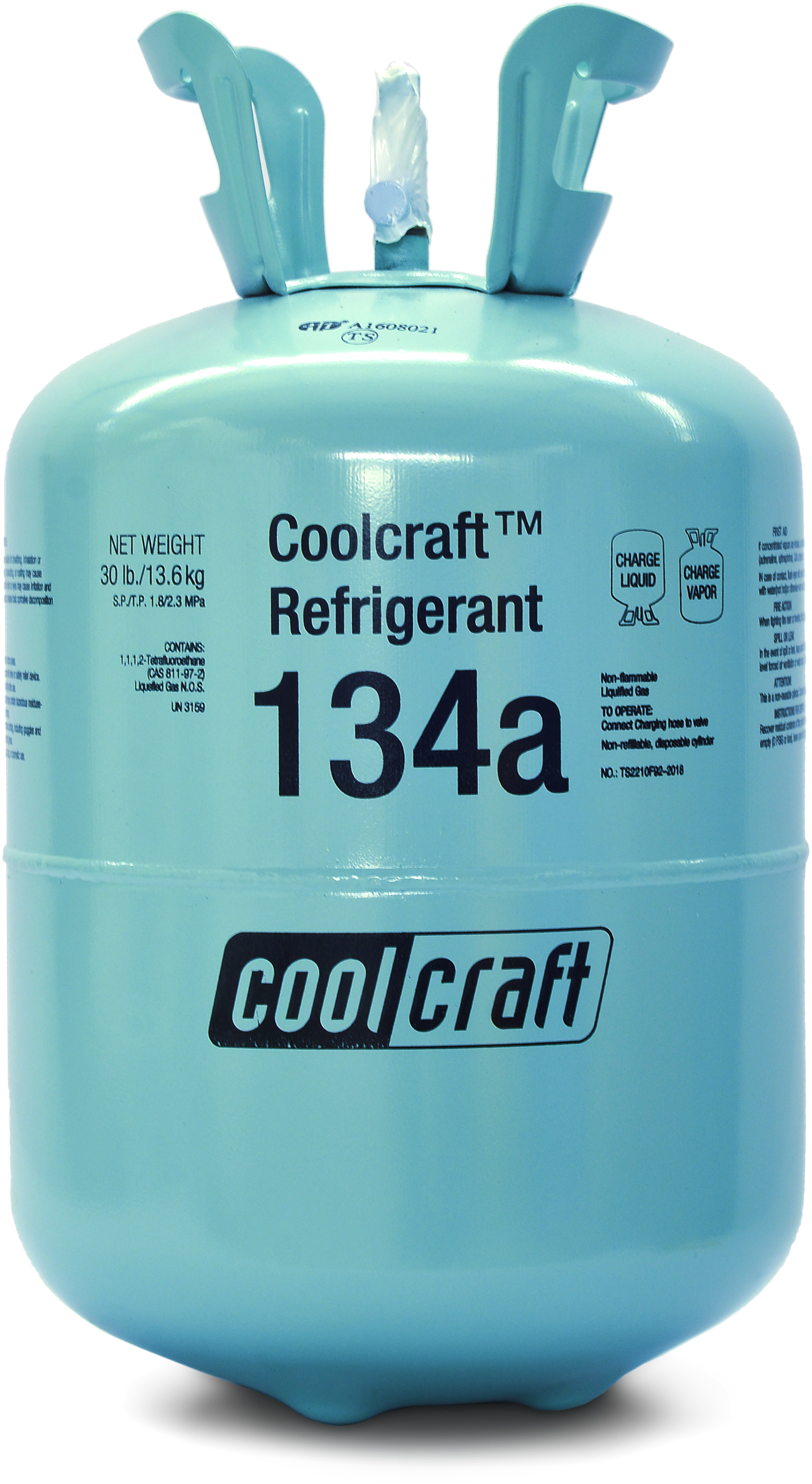
An HFC refrigerant.

Although HFCs are harmless to the ozone layer, they are potent greenhouse gases. While their lifespan in the atmosphere is short (10 to 20 years) relative to carbon dioxide (CO_{2}), HFCs filter infrared radiation much more powerfully. HFCs are therefore thousands of times more heat-trapping than CO_{2}, with a 100 year global warming potential (GWP) between 12 on the low end and 14,800 on the high end. For comparison, the GWP of carbon dioxide is 1. Eliminating emissions of these gases could significantly lower the effects of global warming by avoiding more than 80 billion metric tons of CO_{2} equivalent emissions by 2050, and avoid a full 0.5 degree Celsius of warming above preindustrial levels by the end of the century.

== Details of the amendment ==
Article 5 of the Montreal Protocol created separate standards for developing countries and non-developing. Whether a country was categorized as developing or non-developing depended on individual economic conditions at the time of the agreement or pending special request. Because the Protocol was created in the 1980s and countries economic situations have changed, the Kigali Amendment created three updated groups for compliance with the additional terms.

The first group, comprising non-Article 5 (developed) countries, is committed to reducing HFC consumption to 15% of their baseline by 2036. This baseline is calculated as the average HFC consumption between 2011–2013, plus a 'buffer' of 15% of the party's HCFC baseline to account for the ongoing transition from ozone-depleting substances. A second group, including China and Brazil (Article 5 Group 1), will reduce consumption to 20% of their baseline by 2045. Their baseline includes a larger 65% HCFC component, reflecting a later transition timeline.[GC] Finally, a third group of high-ambient-temperature countries, including India and Saudi Arabia, must reach the 20% reduction target by 2047. A second group, which includes China, India and Brazil, is committed to reducing its consumption by 80% by 2045. Finally, this deadline is extended to 2047 for the rest of the countries, including India and a number of countries in the Middle East, which are large consumers of air conditioning.

In addition, parties that experience monthly average temperatures over 35 °C (95 °F) for at least two months per year, over a period of 10 consecutive years, may request a waiver. (Note: These countries are: Algeria, Bahrain, Benin, Burkina Faso, Central African Republic, Chad, Côte d'Ivoire, Djibouti, Egypt, Eritrea, Gambia, Ghana, Guinea, Guinea-Bissau, Iran (Islamic Republic of), Iraq, Jordan, Kuwait, Libya, Mali, Mauritania, Niger, Nigeria, Oman, Pakistan, Qatar, Saudi Arabia, Senegal, Sudan, Syrian Arab Republic, Togo, Tunisia, Turkmenistan, United Arab Emirates.) Although Denmark approved the amendment, Greenland is excluded.

== Parties ==
Country	Date	Type of agreement
Albania	18 January 2019	Ratification
Andorra	23 January 2019	Acceptance
Angola	16 November 2020	Ratification
Argentina	22 November 2019	Ratification
Armenia	2 May 2019	Acceptance
Australia	27 October 2017	Acceptance
Austria	27 September 2018	Ratification
Azerbaijan	24 November 2025	Ratification
Bahamas	30 May 2023	Ratification
Bahrain	1 July 2024	Ratification
Bangladesh	8 June 2020	Ratification
Barbados	19 April 2018	Ratification
Belarus	3 November 2022	Ratification
Belgium	4 June 2018	Ratification
Belize	3 October 2023	Approval
Benin	19 March 2018	Ratification
Bhutan	27 September 2019	Ratification
Bolivia	9 October 2020	Ratification
Bosnia and Herzegovina	26 May 2021	Ratification
Botswana	19 September 2020	Acceptance
Brazil	19 October 2022	Acceptance
Brunei	18 September 2025	Ratification
Bulgaria	1 May 2018	Ratification
Burkina Faso	26 July 2018	Ratification
Burundi	26 March 2021	Ratification
Cambodia	8 April 2021	Acceptance
Cameroon	24 August 2021	Ratification
Canada	3 November 2017	Ratification
Central African Republic	15 October 2025	Approval
Cape Verde	28 October 2020	Ratification
Chad	26 March 2019	Ratification
Chile	19 September 2017	Ratification
China (Note: Extended to include Macau but excluding Hong Kong.)	17 June 2021	Acceptance
Colombia	25 February 2021	Ratification
Comoros	16 November 2017	Ratification
Congo	16 June 2022	Ratification
Cook Islands	22 August 2019	Acceptance
Costa Rica	23 May 2018	Ratification
Croatia	6 December 2018	Ratification
Cuba	20 June 2019	Ratification
Cyprus	22 July 2019	Ratification
Czech Republic	27 September 2018	Acceptance
Denmark (Note: Excluding Greenland.)	6 December 2018	Approval
Djibouti	8 March 2024	Ratification
Dominican Republic	14 April 2021	Acceptance
Ecuador	22 January 2018	Ratification
Egypt	22 August 2023	Ratification
El Salvador	13 September 2021	Acceptance
Eritrea	7 February 2023	Ratification
Estonia	27 September 2018	Ratification
Eswatini	24 November 2020	Acceptance
Ethiopia	5 July 2019	Ratification
European Union	27 September 2018	Approval
Fiji	16 June 2020	Ratification
Finland	14 November 2017	Acceptance
France	29 March 2018	Approval
Gabon	28 February 2018	Acceptance
Gambia	5 May 2021	Ratification
Georgia	11 July 2023	Acceptance
Germany	14 November 2017	Acceptance
Ghana	2 August 2019	Ratification
Greece	5 October 2018	Ratification
Grenada	29 May 2018	Ratification
Guatemala	11 January 2024	Ratification
Guinea	5 December 2019	Ratification
Guinea-Bissau	22 October 2018	Ratification
Haiti	8 April 2026	Ratification
Holy See	17 June 2020	Ratification
Honduras	28 January 2019	Ratification
Hungary	14 September 2018	Approval
Iceland	25 January 2021	Acceptance
India	27 September 2021	Ratification
Indonesia	14 December 2022	Ratification
Ireland	12 March 2018	Ratification
Israel	5 October 2026	Ratification
Italy	25 May 2022	Ratification
Ivory Coast	29 November 2017	Acceptance
Japan	18 December 2018	Acceptance
Jordan	16 October 2019	Ratification
Kenya	22 September 2023	Acceptance
Kiribati	26 October 2018	Ratification
Kuwait	4 November 2024	Approval
Kyrgyzstan	8 September 2020	Ratification
Laos	16 November 2017	Acceptance
Latvia	17 August 2018	Ratification
Lebanon	5 February 2020	Ratification
Lesotho	7 October 2019	Ratification
Liberia	12 July 2020	Ratification
Liechtenstein	16 September 2020	Ratification
Lithuania	24 July 2018	Ratification
Luxembourg	16 November 2017	Ratification
Madagascar	10 August 2026	Ratification
Malawi	21 November 2017	Ratification
Malaysia	21 October 2020	Ratification
Maldives	13 November 2017	Ratification
Mali	31 March 2017	Acceptance
Malta	19 December 2025	Acceptance
Marshall Islands	15 May 2017	Ratification
Mauritania	11 November 2025	Ratification
Mauritius	1 October 2019	Ratification
Mexico	25 September 2018	Acceptance
Micronesia	12 May 2017	Ratification
Moldova	22 September 2023	Acceptance
Mongolia	27 July 2022	Ratification
Montenegro	23 April 2019	Ratification
Morocco	22 April 2022	Ratification
Mozambique	16 January 2020	Ratification
Namibia	16 May 2019	Acceptance
Nauru	3 November 2022	Ratification
Nepal	6 August 2025	Ratification
Netherlands (Note: Excluding the Dutch Caribbean.)	8 February 2018	Acceptance
New Zealand (Note: Excluding Tokelau.)	3 October 2019	Ratification
Nicaragua	30 September 2020	Ratification
Niger	29 August 2018	Ratification
Nigeria	20 December 2018	Ratification
Niue	24 April 2018	Ratification
North Korea	21 September 2017	Ratification
North Macedonia	12 March 2020	Ratification
Norway	6 September 2017	Ratification
Oman	8 November 2024	Ratification
Pakistan	22 October 2025	Ratification
Palau	29 August 2017	Ratification
Panama	28 September 2018	Ratification
Papua New Guinea	12 November 2024	Ratification
Paraguay	1 November 2018	Acceptance
Peru	7 August 2019	Ratification
Philippines	3 November 2022	Ratification
Poland	7 January 2019	Ratification
Portugal	17 July 2018	Approval
Romania	1 July 2020	Acceptance
Russia	3 October 2020	Acceptance
Rwanda	23 May 2017	Ratification
Samoa	23 March 2018	Ratification
San Marino	20 October 2020	Acceptance
São Tomé and Príncipe	4 October 2019	Ratification
Saudi Arabia	10 September 2025	Acceptance
Senegal	31 August 2018	Ratification
Serbia	8 October 2021	Ratification
Seychelles	20 August 2019	Acceptance
Sierra Leone	15 June 2020	Ratification
Singapore	1 June 2022	Ratification
Slovakia	16 November 2017	Ratification
Slovenia	7 December 2018	Ratification
Solomon Islands	23 May 2022	Ratification
Somalia	27 November 2019	Ratification
South Africa	1 August 2019	Ratification
South Korea	19 January 2023	Ratification
Spain	9 June 2023	Acceptance
Sri Lanka	28 September 2018	Ratification
Saint Kitts and Nevis	29 August 2025	Acceptance
Saint Lucia	2 November 2021	Ratification
Saint Vincent and the Grenadines	7 November 2022	Ratification
Sweden	17 November 2017	Ratification
Switzerland	7 November 2018	Ratification
Syria	5 April 2021	Ratification
Tajikistan	29 June 2022	Ratification
Tanzania	25 March 2022	Ratification
Thailand	3 April 2024	Ratification
Togo	8 March 2018	Acceptance
Tonga	17 September 2018	Ratification
Trinidad and Tobago	17 November 2017	Ratification
Tunisia	27 August 2021	Ratification
Turkey	10 November 2021	Ratification
Turkmenistan	31 August 2020	Ratification
Tuvalu	21 September 2017	Ratification
Uganda	21 June 2018	Ratification
United Arab Emirates	19 April 2024	Acceptance
United Kingdom (Note: Extended to include Gibraltar and the Isle of Man.)	14 November 2017	Ratification
United States	31 October 2022	Ratification
Uruguay	12 September 2018	Ratification
Vanuatu	20 April 2018	Ratification
Venezuela	5 December 2022	Ratification
Vietnam	27 September 2019	Approval
Zambia	15 March 2021	Ratification
Zimbabwe	18 October 2022	Acceptance

== UN members not parties to the amendment ==
Country
Afghanistan
Antigua and Barbuda
Algeria
Democratic Republic of the Congo
Dominica
Equatorial Guinea
Guyana
Iran
Iraq
Jamaica
Kazakhstan
Libya
Monaco
Myanmar
Qatar
South Sudan
Sudan
Suriname
Timor Leste
Ukraine
Uzbekistan
Yemen
