= International Network for Environmental Compliance and Enforcement =

The International Network for Environmental Compliance and Enforcement (INECE) is a global network of environmental compliance and enforcement practitioners dedicated to raising awareness of compliance and enforcement across the regulatory cycle; developing networks for enforcement cooperation; and strengthening capacity to implement and enforce environmental requirements.

Founded in 1989 by The Netherlands Ministry of Housing, Spatial Planning and the Environment and by the United States Environmental Protection Agency (US EPA), INECE links the environmental compliance and enforcement efforts of more than 4,000 practitioners - inspectors, prosecutors, regulators, parliamentarians, judges, international organizations, and non-governmental organizations - from 120 countries.

== Organizational structure ==
INECE's organizational structure consists of its Executive Planning Committee, its implementing Secretariat, and its participants.

The Executive Planning Committee, as the governing body of INECE, defines INECE's cooperative efforts and makes decisions to realize the INECE mission. It is co-chaired by representatives of the U.S. Environmental Protection Agency (USEPA), the Netherlands Ministry of Environment, Housing and Urban Development, and the Brazil Supreme Court. The INECE Secretariat provides technical, administrative, and communications support for Executive Planning Committee functions and helps to implement the INECE work program. Durwood Zaelke, President of the Institute for Governance and Sustainable Development, is the current Director of the INECE Secretariat.

INECE participants include inspectors, prosecutors, regulators, parliamentarians, judges, other governmental officials, and members of international and non-governmental organizations. INECE is an informal network, and any environmental compliance and enforcement practitioners may join the network by registering through the INECE Web site. INECE participants support the mission and objectives of the network, and may carry out these activities on an individual, organizational, bilateral, and/or multilateral basis as appropriate.

== Major Projects and Activities ==
=== International Conference ===
INECE conferences bring together enforcement officials from both developed and developing countries all over the world to share experiences and make plans to take environmental compliance and enforcement efforts to the next level. INECE has hosted eight international conferences since 1990:

- 8th International Conference, Cape Town, South Africa - April 2008;
- 7th International Conference, Marrakesh, Morocco - April 2005;
- 6th International Conference, San Jose, Costa Rica - April 2002;
- 5th International Conference, Monterey, California, USA - November, 1998;
- 4th International Conference, Chiang Mai, Thailand - April, 1996;
- 3rd International Conference, Oaxaca, Mexico - April, 1994;
- 2nd International Conference, Budapest, Hungary - September, 1992;
- 1st International Enforcement Workshop, Utrecht, The Netherlands - May, 1990;

=== INECE Expert Working Groups ===
INECE expert working groups provide opportunities for participants to collaborate to respond to environmental compliance and enforcement challenges and to share knowledge gained with the broader network through workshops, conferences, publications, and email discussion groups. Major expert working groups and topical networks include:

- the Seaport Environmental Security Network
- the International Network for Environmental Compliance Training Professionals
- the INECE Expert Working Group on Compliance Aspects of Emissions Trading
- the INECE Expert Working Group on Environmental Compliance and Enforcement Indicators

=== Capacity Building Programs for Environmental Compliance and Enforcement ===
INECE training resources developed to help individuals responsible for environmental protection in different countries, regions, and localities design and implement compliance strategies and enforcement programs include:

- The Principles of Environmental Enforcement
- Conducting Environmental Inspections Training Manual
- Performance Measurement Guidance for Compliance and Enforcement Practitioners (2nd edition)

== See also ==
- Environmental law
- Global governance
- List of environmental lawsuits
- List of international environmental agreements
- Sustainable development
- Timeline of environmental events
- TRAFFIC, the wildlife trade monitoring network
