= Renyi Zhang =

American geoscientist

- Education: BSc (1983), MSc (1989), PhD (1993)
- Alma mater: Nanjing Institute of Meteorology (BSc), University of Nevada - Reno (MSc), Massacheusetts Institute of Technology (PhD)
- Scientific career
- Workplaces: Texas A&M
- Website: www.chem.tamu.edu/faculty/renyi-zhang/

Renyi Zhang is an American geoscientist, currently a university distinguished professor and Harold G. Haynes Chair at Texas A&M University and an elected fellow of the American Association for the Advancement of Science and American Geophysical Union.
