= Life Cycle Climate Performance =

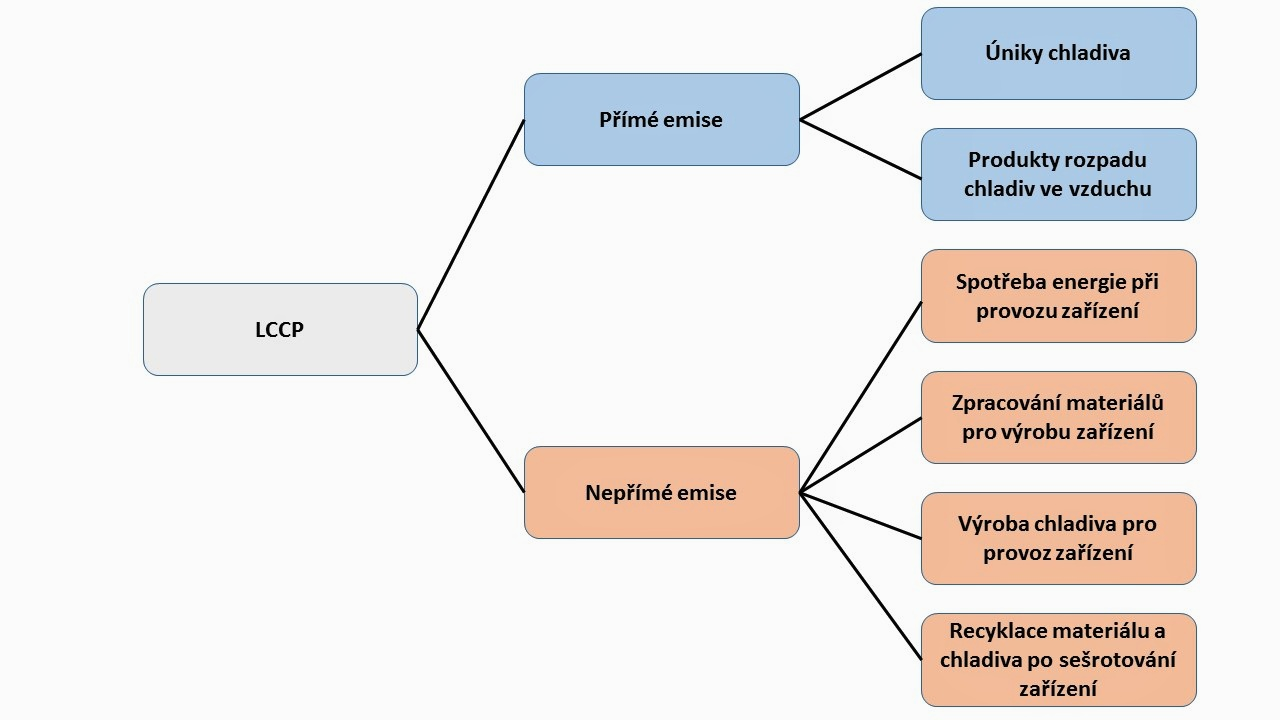
Layout of components

Life Cycle Climate Performance (LCCP) is an evolving method to evaluate the carbon footprint and global warming impact of heating, ventilation, air conditioning (AC), refrigeration systems, and potentially other applications such as thermal insulating foam. It is calculated as the sum of direct, indirect, and embodied greenhouse gas (GHG) emissions generated over the lifetime of the system "from cradle to grave," i.e. from manufacture to disposal. Direct emissions include all climate forcing effects from the release of refrigerants into the atmosphere, including annual leakage and losses during service and disposal of the unit. Indirect emissions include the climate forcing effects of GHG emissions from the electricity powering the equipment. The embodied emissions include the climate forcing effects of the manufacturing processes, transport, and installation for the refrigerant, materials, and equipment, and for recycle or other disposal of the product at end of its useful life.

LCCP is more inclusive than previous metrics such as Total Equivalent Warming Impact (TEWI), which considers direct and indirect GHG emissions but overlooks embodied emissions, and Life Cycle Warming Impact (LCWI), which considers direct, indirect and refrigerant manufacturing emissions but overlooks appliance manufacturing, materials, transport installation and recycle. Enhanced and Localized Life Cycle Climate Performance (EL-LCCP) is the latest and most comprehensive carbon metric and takes into account: 1) real-world operating conditions, including the actual hour-by-hour carbon intensity of electricity generation, transmission, and distribution, which is degraded by high ambient temperature; 2) specific conditions of AC condensers located within urban heat islands and in locations with poor air circulation (mounted to close to buildings, clustered and stacked), as well of refrigerators and refrigerated display cases located against walls, inside cabinets, and other locations that compromise energy efficiency; 3) local climate conditions, such as higher ambient temperature at the location of the equipment than at the weather monitoring stations, which typically are located away from human influence.

TEWI was developed by experts at Oak Ridge National Laboratory under contract from Allied Signal (now Honeywell) and was a step forward as a complement and enhancement of previous metrics like coefficient of performance (COP) and Seasonal Energy Efficiency Ratio (SEER), which consider energy use but not global warming potential (GWP) and emissions of refrigerants.

== Development ==
LCCP was developed in 1999 by an expert working for the United States Environmental Protection Agency and serving on the Montreal Protocol Technology and Economic Assessment Panel (TEAP), who noticed that TEWI ignored the substantial emissions of unwanted hydrofluorocarbon (HFC)-23 byproducts of hydrochlorofluorocarbon (HCFC)-22 production. The byproduct emissions increased the climate forcing GWP of ozone-depleting HCFC-22 by up to 20%, depending on the efficiency of the chemical manufacturing process. At the time, all fluorocarbon manufacturers merely discharged the hazardous HFC-23 chemical waste to the atmosphere. In 2005, a joint committee of the United Nations Intergovernmental Panel on Climate Change (IPCC) and the TEAP endorsed the LCCP metric for use in evaluating low carbon refrigeration and AC equipment.

== Calculation ==
The equations to calculate LCCP for mobile and stationary equipment are similar, with the exception that the calculation for mobile equipment includes the energy consumption necessary to transport the weight of the AC in the vehicle, whether in operation or not.

$LCCP = Direct Emissions + Indirect Emissions+ Embodied Emissions$

$Direct Emissions = C*(L*ALR + EOL)*(GWP + Adp. GWP)$

$Indirect Emissions = L*AEC*EM + \Sigma(m*MM)$

$Embodied Emissions = \Sigma(mr*RM ) + C*(1+ L*ALR)*RFM +C*(1-EOL)*RFD$

where: C = Refrigerant Charge (kg), L=Average Lifetime of Equipment (yr), ALR = Annual Leakage Rate (% of Refrigerant Charge), EOL = End of Life Refrigerant Leakage (% of Refrigerant Charge), GWP = Global Warming Potential (kg CO_{2}e/kg), Adp. GWP = GWP of Atmospheric Degradation Product of the Refrigerant (kg CO_{2}e/kg), AEC = Annual Energy Consumption (kWh), EM = CO_{2} Produced/kWh (kg CO_{2}e/kWh), m = Mass of Unit (kg), MM = CO_{2}e Produced/Material (kg CO_{2}e/kg), mr = Mass of Recycled Material (kg), RM = CO_{2}e Produced/Recycled Material (kg CO_{2}e/kg), RFM = Refrigerant Manufacturing Emissions (kg CO_{2}e/kg), RFD = Refrigerant Disposal Emissions (kg CO_{2}e/kg).

Refrigerant GWP values are typically from the IPCC (2013) for the 100-year timeline.

== Applications ==
=== Motor Vehicle Air Conditioning (MAC) ===
LCCP was perfected for motor vehicle air conditioning (MAC) by a technical committee of the Society of Automotive Engineers (SAE) (now SAE International) and named (Global Refrigerants Energy and ENvironmental – Mobile Air Conditioning – Life Cycle Climate Performance (GREEN-MAC-LCCP©). The GREEN-MAC-LCCP model was approved and assigned SAE Technical Standard J-J2766. The global automotive community used the SAE metric to choose next-generation refrigerant hydrofluoroolefin (HFO)-1234yf (ozone safe; GWP<1) to replace hydrofluorocarbon (HFC)-134a (ozone safe; GWP=1300), which was a temporary replacement for chlorofluorocarbon (CFC)-12 (ozone depletion potential (ODP)=1; GWP=1300) when fast action was needed to avoid a stratospheric ozone tipping point, i.e., destruction at a level that may have been irreversible within human time dimensions.

LCCP was perfected for stationary air conditioning applications by a technical committee of the International Institute of Refrigeration (IIR) chaired by experts from University of Maryland Center for Environmental Energy Engineering (UMD CEEE).

EL-LCCP was developed for room ACs by experts from the UMD CEEE and the Institute for Governance & Sustainable Development (IGSD) working in cooperation with the Government of Morocco and guided by a technical advisory team and ad hoc committee of refrigeration and air conditioning engineers from Brazil, Costa Rica, China, France, and the United States. Moroccan government partners included the Morocco National Ozone Unit; Ministre de l'Énergie, des Mines et du Développement Durable; and Agence Marocaine de l’Efficacité Énergétique (AMEE).
