= Environmental Law Institute =

American non-profit organization

- Founded: 1969; 57 years ago
- Type: 501(c)(3)
- Purpose: Environmental law
- Location: Washington, D.C., U.S.
- President: Jordan Diamond
- Website: www.eli.org

The Environmental Law Institute (ELI) is a nonprofit organization based in Washington, D.C., that runs legal seminars. ELI's audience includes legal practitioners, business leaders, land managers, land use planners, environmentalists, journalists, law students, and lawmakers. The Institute also convenes conferences, holds seminars, and publishes original research.

In 2018, ELI created the Climate Judiciary Project, which has trained more than 2,000 state and federal judges in what it describes as its climate science and law curriculum. Concerns over CJP's influence on judges in climate cases prompted an August 2025 letter from 23 state attorneys general to the EPA requesting an end to federal grants to ELI. ELI received $637,591 from the EPA in 2024 and $866,402 in 2023. In September 2025, Republican members of the House Judiciary Committee sent a letter to ELI requesting information about external funding sources and judicial client lists due to related concerns. Later that month, the EPA announced it was cutting all ties with the ELI.

== Climate Judiciary Project ==
ELI oversees the Climate Judiciary Project (CJP), which according to its website, aims to collaborate "with leading national judicial education institutions to meet judges' need for basic familiarity with climate science methods and concepts."

In August 2025, 23 state attorneys general sent a letter to EPA Chief Administrator Lee Zeldin asking him to end grants to ELI, which oversees the CJP. According to the letter, "The Climate Judiciary Project's mission is clear: lobby judges in order to make climate change policy through the courts." The ELI received $637,591 from the EPA in 2024 and $866,402 in 2023, according to data gathered by ProPublica. The attorneys general letter indicated that ELI also expected to continue receiving future funding, although none of these funds went to the Climate Judiciary Project. According to the ELI, over 2,000 state and federal judges have participated in the project's educational programs.

Senator Ted Cruz has also criticized the Climate Judiciary Project for its efforts to, in his words, "train judges" and "make them agreeable to creative climate litigation tactics." Portions of CJP's website, including testimonials from judges who had participated in its programming, were overhauled and removed from the website after reporting about CJP's judicial education programs was published in July 2025. On CJP's online forum, which ran from September 2022 until May 2024, Fox News Digital reported that "favorable quotes from judges were anonymized and attributed to a 'participating judge,' while two other quotes remained unchanged and were both attributed to a 'participating judge.'"

In September 2025, Republicans on the House Judiciary Committee began a probe of the ELI over claims that the group and its CJP had attempted to influence judges overseeing climate policy cases. In a letter requesting ELI funding sources and judicial clients, Committee Chairman Jim Jordan and two other lawmakers wrote that "Public reports have documented concerns around apparent efforts by [ELI] to influence judges who potentially may be presiding over lawsuits related to alleged climate change," and that "These efforts appear to have the underlying goal of predisposing federal and state judges in favor of plaintiffs alleging injuries from the manufacturing, marketing, or sale of fossil-fuel products."
