= F. Sherwood Rowland =

American chemist (1927–2012)

Frank Sherwood Rowland
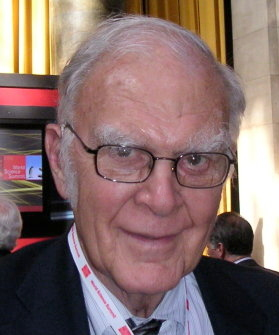
- Rowland at the inaugural World Science Summit, May 2008
- Born: June 28, 1927; Delaware, Ohio, US
- Died: March 10, 2012 (aged 84); Newport Beach, California, US
- Education: Ohio Wesleyan University (BA); University of Chicago (PhD)
- Known for: Ozone depletion research
- Awards: ForMemRS (2004); Nobel Prize in Chemistry (1995); Roger Revelle Medal (1994); Albert Einstein World Award of Science (1994); Peter Debye Award (1993); Japan Prize (1989); Tyler Prize for Environmental Achievement (1983); Tolman Award (1976)
- Scientific career
- Fields: Chemistry
- Workplaces: University of California, Irvine
- Thesis: The epithermal reactions of recoil atoms (1952)
- Doctoral advisor: Willard Libby

Frank Sherwood "Sherry" Rowland (June 28, 1927 – March 10, 2012) was an American Nobel laureate and a professor of chemistry at the University of California, Irvine. His research was on atmospheric chemistry and chemical kinetics. His best-known work was the discovery that chlorofluorocarbons contribute to ozone depletion.

== Education and early life ==
Born in Delaware, Ohio, Rowland received a majority of his education in public schools and, due to accelerated promotion was able to graduate high school several weeks before his 16th birthday. In the summers during his high school career, Frank was entrusted to run the local weather service station. This was Rowland's first exposure to systematic experimentation and data collection. After entering Ohio Wesleyan University, Rowland was about to graduate shortly before his 18th birthday. Instead, he was enlisted to the Navy to train radar operators. Rowland was discharged after 14 months as a non commissioned officer. After entering the University of Chicago, Rowland was assigned Willard F. Libby as a mentor and began to study radiochemistry. Rowland's thesis was about the chemical state of cyclotron-produced radioactive bromine atoms. Rowland received his B.A. from Ohio Wesleyan University in 1948. He then earned his M.S. in 1951 and his Ph.D. in 1952, both from the University of Chicago.

== Career and research ==
Rowland held academic posts at Princeton University (1952–1956) and at the University of Kansas (1956–1964) before becoming a professor of chemistry at the University of California, Irvine, in 1964. At Irvine in the early 1970s he began working with Mario J. Molina. Rowland was elected to the National Academy of Sciences in 1978 and served as a president of American Association for the Advancement of Science (AAAS) in 1993. His best-known work was the discovery that chlorofluorocarbons contribute to ozone depletion. Rowland theorized that man made organic compound gases will decompose as a result of solar radiation in the stratosphere, releasing atoms of chlorine which react with oxygen (ozone) to form chlorine monoxide, and that they are individually able to destroy large numbers of ozone molecules. It was obvious that Rowland had a good idea of what was occurring at higher altitudes when he stated "...I knew that such a molecule could not remain inert in the atmosphere forever, if only because solar photochemistry at high altitudes would break it down". Rowland's research, first published in Nature magazine in 1974, initiated a scientific investigation of the problem. In 1978, a first ban on CFC-based aerosols in spray cans was issued in the United States. The actual production did however not stop and was soon on the old levels. It took until the 1980s to allow for a global regulation policy.

Rowland performed many measurements of the atmosphere. One experiment included collecting air samples at various cities and locations around the globe to determine CCl_{3}F North-South mixing. By measuring the concentrations at different latitudes, Rowland was able to see that CCl_{3}F was mixing between hemispheres quite rapidly. The same measurement was repeated 8 years later, and the results showed a steady increase in CCl_{3}F concentrations. Rowland's work also showed how the density of the ozone layer varied by season increasing in November and decreasing until April where it levels out for the summer only to increase in November. Data gained throughout successive years showed that although the pattern was consistent, the overall ozone levels were dropping. Rowland and his colleagues interacted both with the public and the political side and suggested various solutions, which allowed to step wise reduce the CFC impact. CFC emissions were regulated first within Canada, the United States, Sweden and Norway. In the 1980s, the Vienna Agreement and the Montreal Protocol allowed for global regulation.

== Awards and honors ==
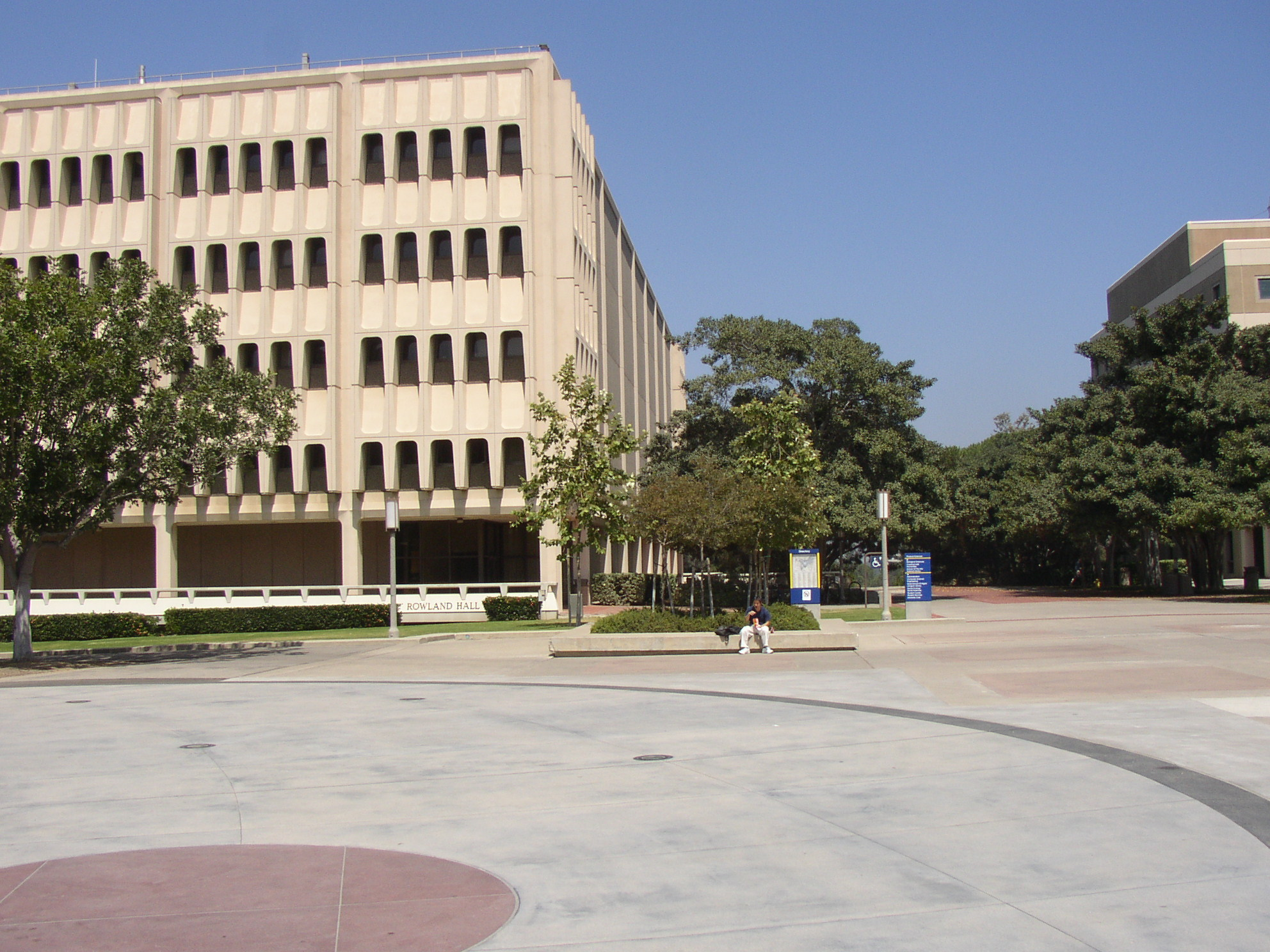
Rowland Hall at the University of California, Irvine is named after Rowland.

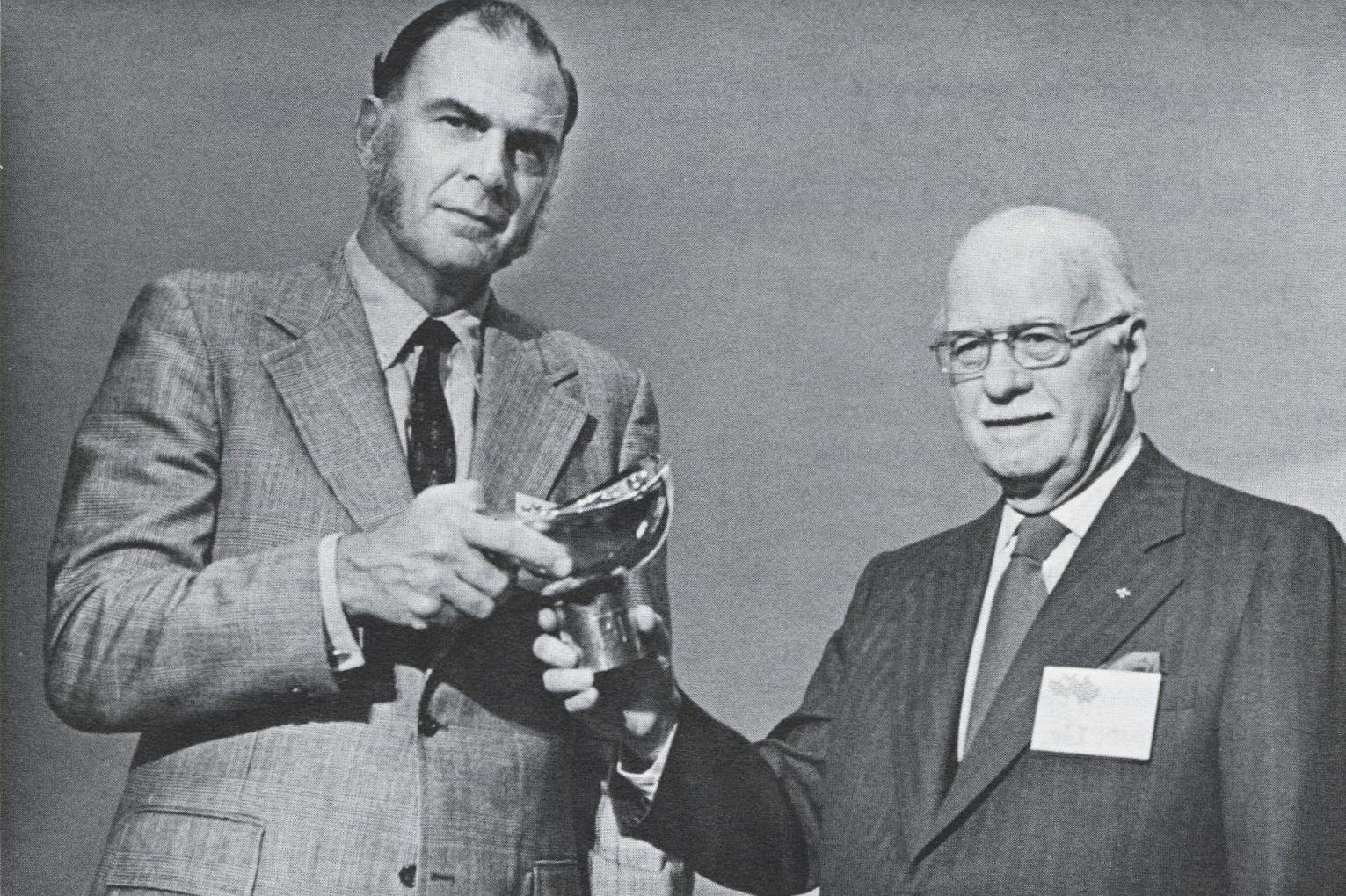
Rowland (left) receives an award from the Rochester Institute of Technology in 1975.

Rowland won numerous awards for his work:

- Tolman Medal, 1976
- Elected to the American Academy of Arts and Sciences
- Leo Szilard Lectureship Award, 1979
- Tyler Prize for Environmental Achievement, 1983
- Japan Prize, 1989
- Honorary Doctor of Science (Sc.D.) degree from Whittier College, 1989
- Peter Debye Award, 1993
- Albert Einstein World Award of Science, 1994
- Roger Revelle Medal, 1994
- Nobel Prize in Chemistry, 1995
- Elected to the American Philosophical Society (1995)
- Golden Plate Award of the American Academy of Achievement, 1996
- In 1998, the UC Irvine physical sciences building was named after Rowland. A bust of Rowland is visible in the lobby.
- Elected a Foreign Member of the Royal Society (ForMemRS) in 2004
- Mount Rowland in Antarctica was named after him in 2007
- STEM Wing At Rutherford B. Hayes High School in Delaware, Ohio named in his honor

== Personal life ==
Frank Rowland was the father of art historian Ingrid Rowland and Jeff Rowland. He had two granddaughters. After suffering from a short bout of ill health, Rowland died on March 10, 2012, of complications from Parkinson's disease. Upon hearing the news, renowned chemist and good friend Mario J. Molina stated: "Sherry was a prime influence throughout my career and had inspired me and many others to walk in the shadow of his greatness".
