= Mario Molina =

Mexican chemist (1943–2020)

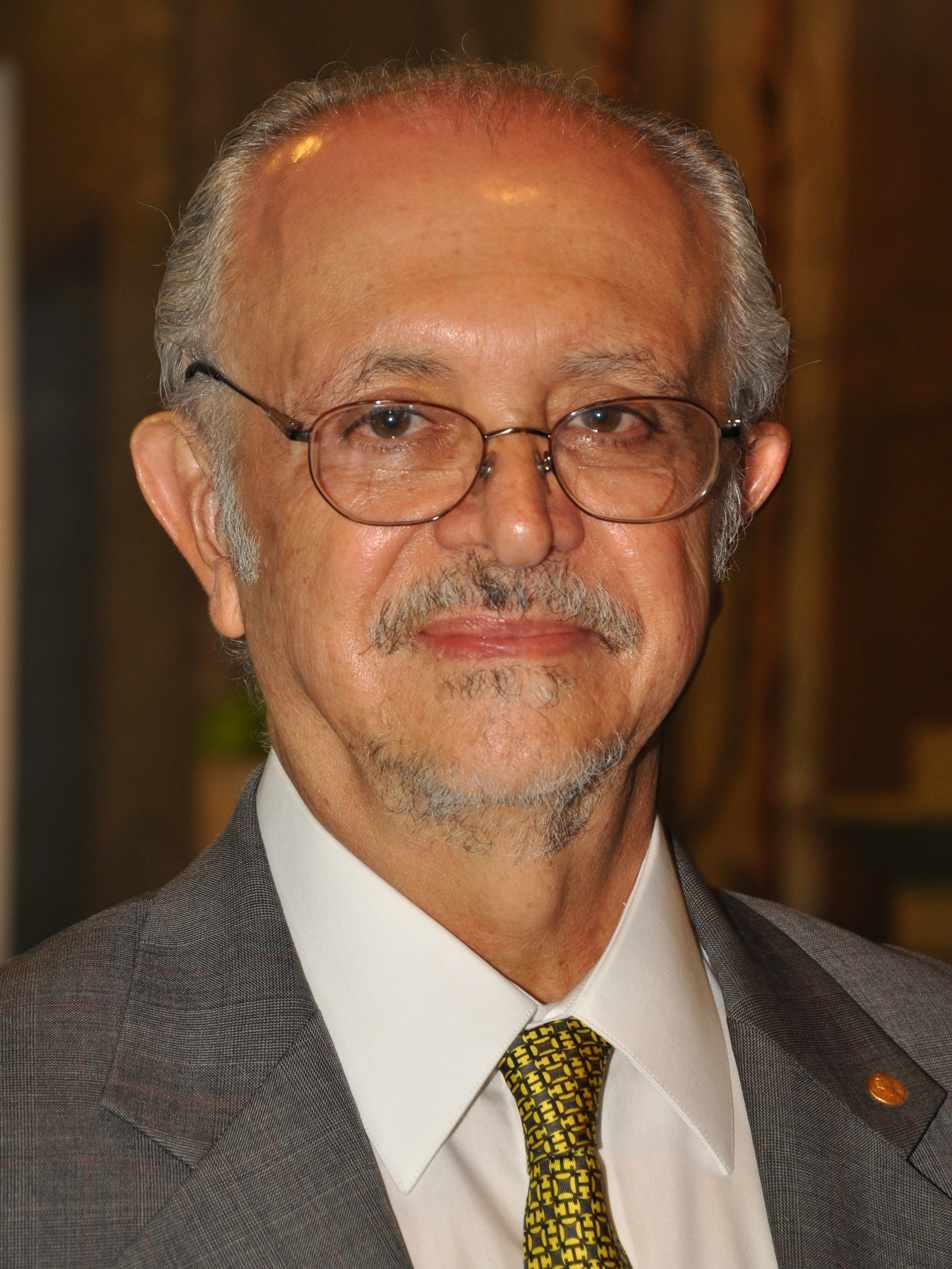
- Molina in 2011
- Born: Mario José Molina Henríquez; 19 March 1943; Mexico City, Mexico
- Died: 7 October 2020 (aged 77); Mexico City, Mexico
- Education: National Autonomous University of Mexico (BS); University of Freiburg (MS); University of California, Berkeley (PhD)
- Spouses: Luisa Tan (m. 1973; div. 2005); Guadalupe Alvarez (m. 2006)
- Awards: See list: Tyler Prize for Environmental Achievement (1983); Newcomb Cleveland Prize (1987); NASA Exceptional Scientific Achievement Medal (1989); Nobel Prize in Chemistry (1995); Willard Gibbs Award (1998); UN Environment Programme Sasakawa Environment Prize (1999); Heinz Award in the Environment (2003); Volvo Environment Prize (2004); Presidential Medal of Freedom (2013)
- Scientific career
- Fields: Chemistry
- Workplaces: See list: University of California, San Diego; Massachusetts Institute of Technology; Jet Propulsion Laboratory; California Institute of Technology; University of California, Irvine; National Autonomous University of Mexico
- Thesis: Vibrational Populations Through Chemical Laser Studies: Theoretical and Experimental Extensions of the Equal-gain Technique (1967)
- Doctoral advisor: George C. Pimentel
- Doctoral students: Renyi Zhang
- Website: Official website

External audio
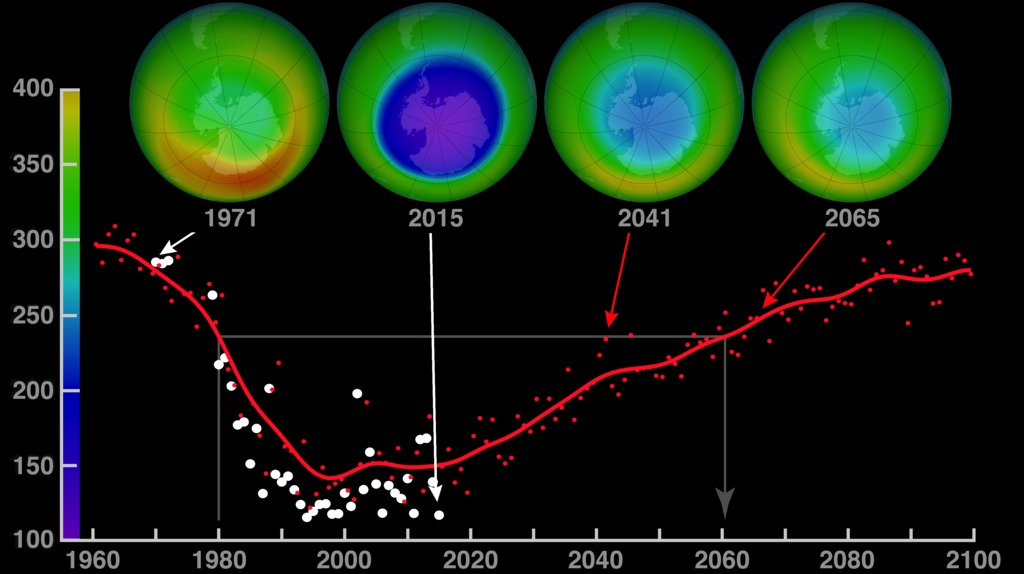
- "Whatever Happened to the Ozone Hole?: An environmental success story", Distillations Podcast 230, Science History Institute, 17 April 2018
- "The Sky Is Falling", History This Week

Mario José Molina-Pasquel Henríquez (Note: In this Spanish name, the first or paternal surname is Molina-Pasquel and the second or maternal family name is Henríquez.) (19 March 1943 – 7 October 2020) was a Mexican physical chemist. He played a pivotal role in the discovery of the Antarctic ozone hole, and was a co-recipient of the 1995 Nobel Prize in Chemistry for his role in discovering the threat to the Earth's ozone layer from chlorofluorocarbon (CFC) gases. He was the first Mexican-born scientist to receive a Nobel Prize in Chemistry and the third Mexican-born person to receive a Nobel prize.

In his career, Molina held research and teaching positions at University of California, Irvine, California Institute of Technology, Massachusetts Institute of Technology, University of California, San Diego, and the Center for Atmospheric Sciences at the Scripps Institution of Oceanography. Molina was also Director of the Mario Molina Center for Energy and Environment in Mexico City. Molina was a climate policy advisor to the President of Mexico, Enrique Peña Nieto.

== Early life ==
Molina was born in Mexico City to Roberto Molina Pasquel and Leonor Henríquez. His father was a lawyer and diplomat who served as an ambassador to Ethiopia, Australia and the Philippines. His mother was a family manager. With considerably different interests than his parents, Mario Molina went on to make one of the biggest discoveries in environmental science. In his early years he shortly started a monopolistic garage business manufacturing polyurethane foam.

Mario Molina attended both elementary and primary school in Mexico, and attended high school at a boarding school in Switzerland. However, before even attending high school, Mario Molina had developed a deep interest in chemistry. As a child he converted a bathroom in his home into his own little laboratory, using toy microscopes and chemistry sets. Ester Molina, Mario's aunt, and an already established chemist, nurtured his interests and aided him in completing more complex chemistry experiments. At this time, Mario knew he wanted to pursue a career in chemistry, and at the age of 11, he was sent to a boarding school in Switzerland at Institut auf dem Rosenberg, where he learnt to speak German. Before this, Mario had initially wanted to become a professional violinist, but his love for chemistry triumphed over that interest. At first Mario was disappointed when he arrived at the boarding school in Switzerland due to the fact that most of his classmates did not have the same interest in science as he did.

Molina's early career consisted of research at various academic institutions. Molina went on to earn his bachelor's degree in chemical engineering at the National Autonomous University of Mexico (UNAM) in 1965. Following this, Molina studied polymerization kinetics at the Albert Ludwig University of Freiburg, West Germany, for two years. Finally, he was accepted for graduate study at the University of California, Berkeley. After earning his doctorate he made his way to UC Irvine. He then returned to Mexico where he kickstarted the first chemical engineering program at his alma mater. This was only the beginning of his chemistry endeavors.

== Career ==
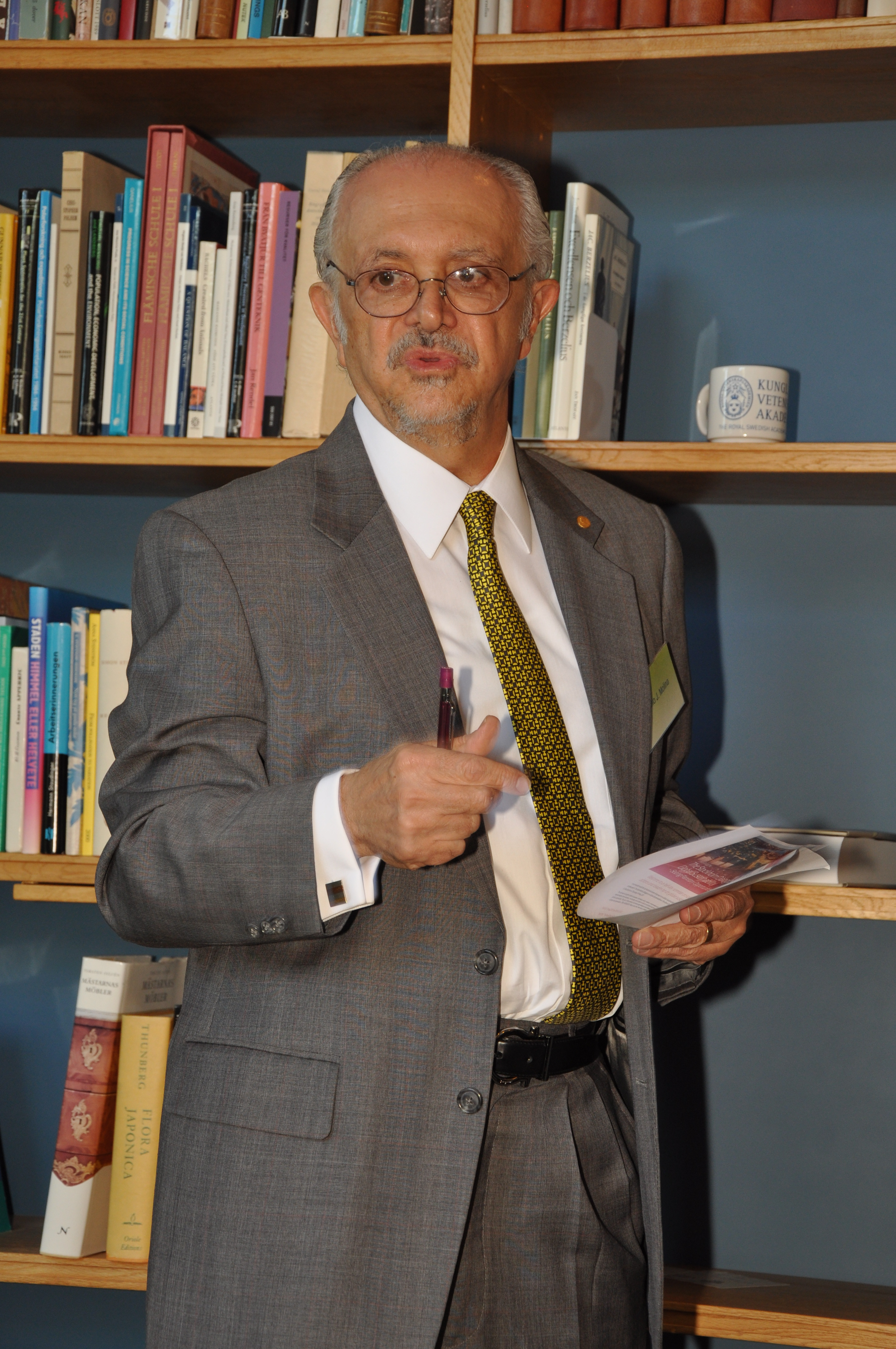
Molina at the 2011 Nobel Laureate Global Symposium

Mario Molina began his studies at the University of California at Berkeley in 1968, where he would obtain his PhD in physical chemistry. Throughout his years at Berkeley, he participated in various research projects such as the study of molecular dynamics using chemical lasers and investigation of the distribution of internal energy in the products of chemical and photochemical reactions. Throughout this journey is where he worked with his professor and mentor George C. Pimentel who grew his love for chemistry even further. After completing his PhD in physical chemistry, in 1973, he enrolled in a research program at the University of California, Irvine, with Sherwood Rowland. The topic of interest was Chlorofluorocarbons (CFCs). The two would later on make one of the largest discoveries in atmospheric chemistry. They were the first to recognize that CFCs could destroy Earth's protective ozone layer. They developed their theory of ozone depletion, which later influenced the mass public to reduce their use of CFCs. This kickstarted his career as a widely known chemist.

Between 1974 and 2004, Molina variously held research and teaching posts at University of California, Irvine, the Jet Propulsion Laboratory at Caltech, and the Massachusetts Institute of Technology (MIT), where he held a joint appointment in the Department of Earth Atmospheric and Planetary Sciences and the Department of Chemistry. On 1 July 2004, Molina joined the Department of Chemistry and Biochemistry at University of California, San Diego, and the Center for Atmospheric Sciences at the Scripps Institution of Oceanography. In addition he established a non-profit organization, which opened the Mario Molina Center for Strategic Studies in Energy and the Environment (Spanish: Centro Mario Molina para Estudios Estratégicos sobre Energía y Medio Ambiente) in Mexico City in 2005. Molina served as its director.

Molina served on the board of trustees for Science Service, now known as Society for Science & the Public, from 2000 to 2005. He also served on the board of directors of the John D. and Catherine T. MacArthur Foundation (2004–2014), and as a member of the MacArthur Foundation's Institutional Policy Committee and its Committee on Global Security and Sustainability.

Molina was nominated to the Pontifical Academy of Sciences as of 24 July 2000. He served as a co-chair of the Vatican workshop and co-author of the report Well Under 2 Degrees Celsius: Fast Action Policies to Protect People and the Planet from Extreme Climate Change (2017) with Veerabhadran Ramanathan and Durwood Zaelke. The report proposed 12 scalable and practical solutions which are part of a three-lever cooling strategy to mitigate climate change.

Molina was named by US president Barack Obama to form a transition team on environmental issues in 2008. Under President Obama, he was a member of the United States President's Council of Advisors on Science and Technology.

Molina sat on the board of directors for Xyleco.

He contributed to the content of the papal encyclical Laudato Si'.

In 2020, Mario Molina contributed to research regarding the importance of wearing face masks amid the SARS-COV-2 pandemic. The research article titled "Identifying airborne transmission as the dominant route for the spread of COVID-19" was published in the Proceedings of the National Academy of Sciences of the United States of America Journal in collaboration with Renyi Zhang, Yixin Li, Annie L. Zhang and Yuan Wang.

== Work on CFCs ==
Molina joined the lab of Professor F. Sherwood Rowland in 1973 as a postdoctoral fellow. Here, Molina continued Rowland's pioneering research into "hot atom" chemistry, which is the study of chemical properties of atoms with excess translational energy owing to radioactive processes.

This study soon led to research into chlorofluorocarbons (CFCs), apparently harmless gases that were used in refrigerants, aerosol sprays, and the making of plastic foams. CFCs were being released by human activity and were known to be accumulating in the atmosphere. The basic scientific question Molina asked was "What is the consequence of society releasing something to the environment that wasn't there before?"

Rowland and Molina had investigated compounds similar to CFCs before. Together they developed the CFC ozone depletion theory, by combining basic scientific knowledge about the chemistry of ozone, CFCs and atmospheric conditions with computer modelling. First Molina tried to figure out how CFCs could be decomposed. At lower levels of the atmosphere, they were inert. Molina realized that if CFCs released into the atmosphere do not decay by other processes, they will continually rise to higher altitudes. Higher in the atmosphere, different conditions apply. The highest levels of the stratosphere are exposed to the sun's ultraviolet light. A thin layer of ozone floating high in the stratosphere protects lower levels of the atmosphere from that type of radiation.

Molina theorized that photons from ultraviolet light, known to break down oxygen molecules, could also break down CFCs, releasing a number of products including chlorine atoms into the stratosphere. Chlorine atoms (Cl) are radicals: they have an unpaired electron and are very reactive. Chlorine atoms react easily with ozone molecules (O_{3}), removing one oxygen atom to leave O_{2} and chlorine monoxide (ClO).

Cl· + O_{3} → ClO· + O_{2}

ClO is also a radical, which reacts with another ozone molecule to release two more O_{2} molecules and a Cl atom.

ClO· + O_{3} → Cl· + 2O_{2}

The radical Cl atom is not consumed by this pair of reactions, so it remains in the system.

Molina and Rowland predicted that chlorine atoms, produced by this decomposition of CFCs, would act as an ongoing catalyst for the destruction of ozone. When they calculated the amounts involved, they realized that CFCs could start a seriously damaging chain reaction to the ozone layer in the stratosphere.

In 1974, as a postdoctoral researcher at University of California, Irvine, Molina and F. Sherwood Rowland co-authored a paper in the journal Nature highlighting the threat of CFCs to the ozone layer in the stratosphere. At the time, CFCs were widely used as chemical propellants and refrigerants. Molina and Rowland followed up the short Nature paper with a 150-page report for the United States Atomic Energy Commission (AEC), which they made available at the September 1974 meeting of the American Chemical Society in Atlantic City. This report and an ACS-organized press conference, in which they called for a complete ban on further releases of CFCs into the atmosphere, brought national attention.

Rowland and Molina's findings were disputed by commercial manufacturers and chemical industry groups, and a public consensus on the need for action only began to emerge in 1976 with the publication of a review of the science by the National Academy of Sciences. Rowland and Molina's work was further supported by evidence of the long-term decrease in stratospheric ozone over Antarctica, published by Joseph C. Farman and his co-authors in Nature in 1985. Ongoing work led to the adoption of the Montreal Protocol (an agreement to cut CFC production and use) by 56 countries in 1987, and to further steps towards the worldwide elimination of CFCs from aerosol cans and refrigerators. By establishing this protocol, the amount of CFCs being emitted into the atmosphere decreased significantly, and while doing so, it has paced the rate of ozone depletion and even slowed climate change. It is for this work that Molina later shared the Nobel Prize in Chemistry in 1995 with Paul J. Crutzen and F. Sherwood Rowland. The citation specifically recognized him and his co-awardees for "their work in atmospheric chemistry, particularly concerning the formation and decomposition of ozone."

Following this in 1985, after Joseph Farman discovered a hole in the ozone layer in Antarctica, Mario Molina led a research team to further investigate the cause of rapid ozone depletion in Antarctica. It was found that the stratospheric conditions in Antarctica were ideal for chlorine activation, which ultimately causes ozone depletion.

After the successful implementation of the Montreal Protocol, Molina's continued advocacy for climate action helped shape global environmental policies. His work also contributed to the development of international climate agreements, such as the Paris Agreement in 2015, which aimed to limit global temperature rise and reduce emissions, including those of harmful chemicals like CFCs.

== Honors ==
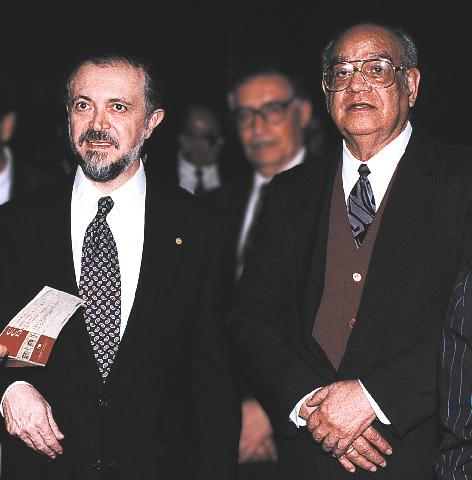
Molina (left) with his countryman Luis E. Miramontes, co-inventor of the first oral contraceptive, c. 1995

Molina received numerous awards and honors, including sharing the 1995 Nobel Prize in chemistry with Paul J. Crutzen and F. Sherwood Rowland for their discovery of the role of CFCs in ozone depletion.

Molina was elected to the United States National Academy of Sciences in 1993. He was elected to the United States Institute of Medicine in 1996, and The National College of Mexico in 2003. In 2007, he was elected to the American Philosophical Society. He was also a member of the Mexican Academy of Sciences. Molina was a fellow of the American Association for the Advancement of Science and co-chaired the 2014 AAAS Climate Science Panel, What We Know: The reality, risks and response to climate change.

Molina won the 1987 Esselen Award of the Northeast section of the American Chemical Society, the 1988 Newcomb Cleveland Prize from the American Association for the Advancement of Science, the 1989 NASA Medal for Exceptional Scientific Advancement and the 1989 United Nations Environmental Programme Global 500 Award. In 1990, The Pew Charitable Trusts Scholars Program in Conservation and the Environment honored him as one of ten environmental scientists and awarded him a $150,000 grant. In 1996, Molina received the Golden Plate Award of the American Academy of Achievement. He received the 1998 Willard Gibbs Award from the Chicago Section of the American Chemical Society and the 1998 American Chemical Society Prize for Creative Advances in Environment Technology and Science. In 2003, Molina received the 9th Annual Heinz Award in the Environment.

Asteroid 9680 Molina is named in his honor.

On 8 August 2013, US president Barack Obama announced Molina as a recipient of the Presidential Medal of Freedom, saying in the press release:

Mario Molina is a visionary chemist and environmental scientist. Born in Mexico, Dr. Molina came to [The United States] to pursue his graduate degree. He later earned the Nobel Prize in Chemistry for discovering how chlorofluorocarbons deplete the ozone layer. Dr. Molina is a professor at the University of California, San Diego; Director of the Mario Molina Center for Energy and Environment; and a member of the President's Council of Advisors on Science and Technology. Molina was one of twenty-two Nobel Laureates who signed the third Humanist Manifesto in 2003.

Mario Molina is the recipient of the Lifetime Achievement Award (Champions of the Earth) in 2014.

On 19 March 2023, Molina was the subject of a Google Doodle in Mexico, the United States, Brazil, India, Germany, France, and other countries.

=== Honorary degrees ===
Molina received more than thirty honorary degrees.

- Yale University (1997)
- Tufts University (2003)
- Duke University (2009)
- Harvard University (2012)
- Mexican Federal Universities: National of Mexico (1996), Metropolitana (2004), Chapingo (2007), National Polytechnic (2009)
- Mexican State Universities: Hidalgo (2002), State of Mexico (2006), Michoacan (2009), Guadalajara (2010), San Luis Potosí (2011)
- U.S. Universities: Miami (2001), Florida International (2002), Southern Florida (2005), Claremont Graduate (announced 2013)
- U.S. Colleges: Connecticut (1998), Trinity (2001), Washington (2011), Whittier (2012), Williams (2015)
- Canadian Universities: Calgary (1997), Waterloo (2002), British Columbia (2011)
- European Universities: East Anglia (1996), Alfonso X (2009), Complutense of Madrid (2012), Free of Brussels (2010),

== Personal life ==
Molina married fellow chemist Luisa Y. Tan in July 1973. They met each other when Molina was pursuing his PhD at the University of California, Berkeley. They moved to Irvine, California in the fall of 1973. The couple divorced in 2005. Luisa Tan Molina is now the lead scientist of the Molina Center for Strategic Studies in Energy and the Environment in La Jolla, California. Their son, Felipe Jose Molina, was born in 1977. Molina married his second wife, Guadalupe Álvarez, in February 2006.

Molina died on 7 October 2020, aged 77, due to a heart attack.

== Works ==
- Molina, Luisa T., Molina, Mario J. and Renyi Zhang. "Laboratory Investigation of Organic Aerosol Formation from Aromatic Hydrocarbons", Massachusetts Institute of Technology (MIT), United States Department of Energy, (August 2006).
- Molina, Luisa T., Molina, Mario J., et al. "Characterization of Fine Particulate Matter (PM) and Secondary PM Precursor Gases in the Mexico City Metropolitan Area", Massachusetts Institute of Technology (MIT), United States Department of Energy, (October 2008).
