= Automatic fire suppression =

Fire suppression systems that operate without human control

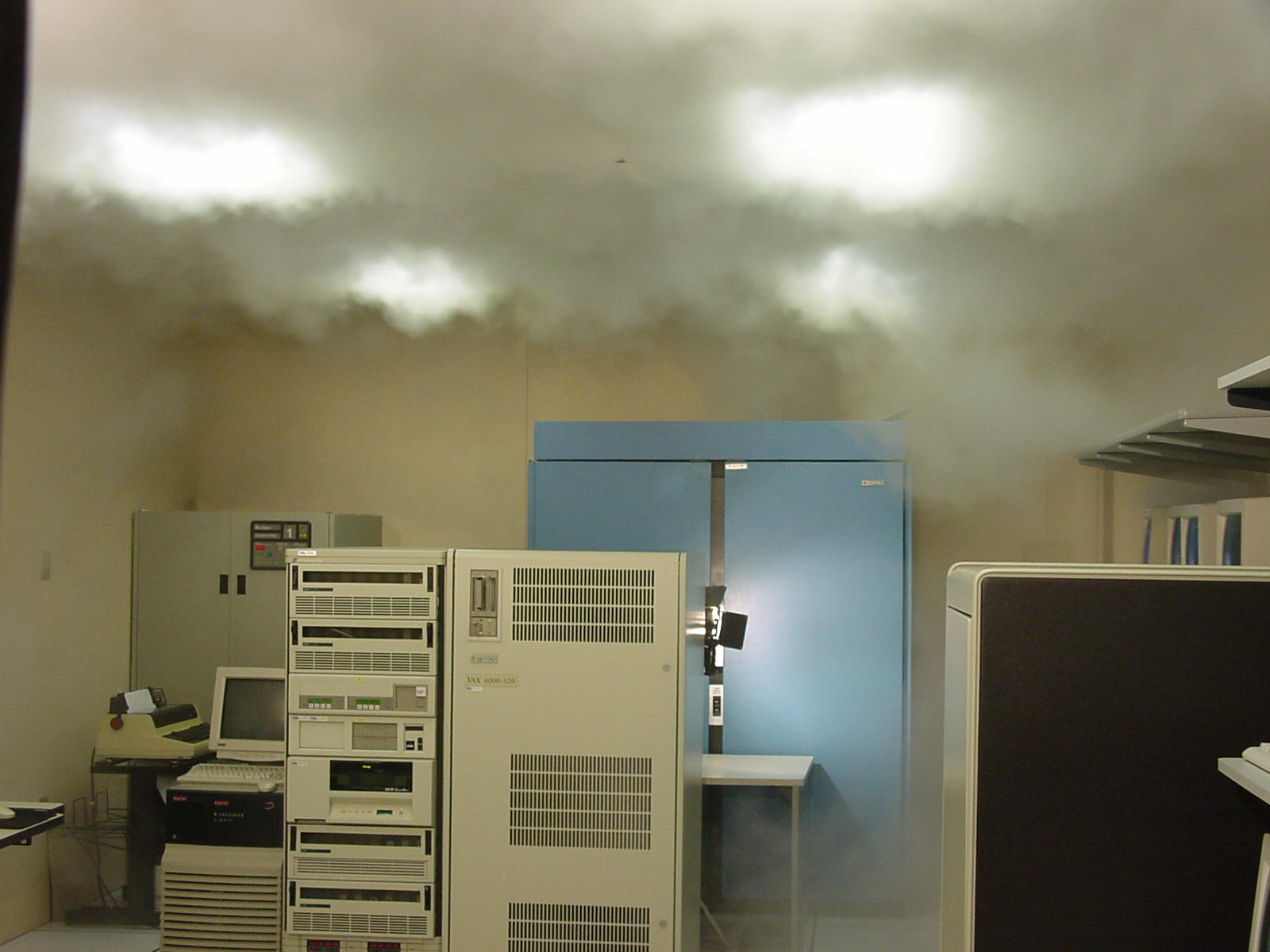
Operation of a gas fire extinguishing system in a server room

Automatic fire suppression systems control and extinguish fires without human intervention. Examples of automatic systems include fire sprinkler system, gaseous fire suppression, and condensed aerosol fire suppression. When fires are extinguished in the early stages loss of life is minimal since 93% of all fire-related deaths occur once the fire has progressed beyond the early stages.

== Types of automatic systems ==
Today there are numerous types of automatic fire suppression systems and standards for each one. Systems are as diverse as the many applications. In general, however, automatic fire suppression systems fall into two categories: engineered and pre-engineered systems.

- Engineered fire suppression systems are design-specific and most commonly used for larger installations where the system is designed for a particular application. Examples include large marine and land vehicle applications, server rooms, public and private buildings, industrial paint lines, dip tanks and electrical switch rooms. Engineered systems use a number of gaseous or solid agents with many of them being specifically formulated. Some are even stored as a liquid and discharged as a gas.
- Pre-engineered fire suppression systems use pre-designed elements to eliminate the need for engineering work beyond the original product design. Typical industrial solutions use a wet or dry chemical agent, such as potassium carbonate or monoammonium phosphate (MAP), to protect relatively smaller spaces such as distribution boards, battery rooms, engine bays, wind turbines, hazardous goods and other storage areas. A number of residential designs have also emerged that typically employ water mist and target retrofit applications.

== Components ==
By definition, an automatic fire suppression system can operate without human intervention. To do so it must possess a means of detection, actuation and delivery. In many systems, detection is accomplished by mechanical or electrical means. Mechanical detection uses fusible-link or thermo-bulb detectors. These detectors are designed to separate at a specific temperature and release tension on a release mechanism. Electrical detection uses heat detectors equipped with self-restoring, normally-open contacts which close when a predetermined temperature is reached. Remote and local manual operation is also possible. Actuation usually involves either a pressurized fluid and a release valve, or in some cases an electric pump. Delivery is accomplished by means of piping and nozzles. Nozzle design is specific to the agent used and coverage desired.

== Extinguishing agents ==
Water is the most prevalent fire suppression agent in use worldwide. However, the use of water does have some limitations, which can range from inadequate supplies (particularly in less developed regions) to operations and processes which are highly susceptible to water damage. In some cases, certain contents or processes (such as water-reactive chemicals or metals, molten materials, etc.) are truly incompatible with water; water discharge could lead to explosion. In these instances, alternative chemical compounds, inert gases and similar can be utilized for fire suppression as outlined below:

Agent	Primary ingredient	Applications
HFC 227ea (e.g. FM-200)	Heptafluoropropane	Electronics, medical equipment, production equipment, libraries, data centers, medical record rooms, server rooms, oil pumping stations, engine compartments, telecommunications rooms, switch rooms, engine and machinery spaces, pump rooms, control rooms
FK-5-1-12 (3M Novec 1230 Fire Protection Fluid)	Fluorinated ketone	Electronics, medical equipment, production equipment, libraries, data centers, medical record rooms, server rooms, oil pumping stations, engine compartments, telecommunications rooms, switch rooms, engine and machinery spaces, pump rooms, control rooms
IG-01	Argon	Same applications as FM-200 and Novec 1230 fluid; less Class B style hazards
IG-55	Argon (50%) and nitrogen (50%)	See IG-01
IG-100	Nitrogen	See IG-01
IG-541	Argon (40%), nitrogen (52%) and carbon dioxide (8%)	See IG-01
Carbon dioxide	Carbon dioxide	Non-occupied control rooms, coating operations, paint lines, dust collectors, transformer vaults, live electrical equipment, flammable liquids, commercial fryers
FE-13	Fluoroform	Police evidence freezers, inerting natural gas pumping stations or trains/trucks/cranes operating in cold weather, electronics, medical equipment, production equipment, libraries, data centers, medical record rooms, server rooms, oil pumping stations, engine compartments, telecommunications rooms, switch rooms, engine and machinery spaces, pump rooms, control rooms
Wet chemical	Potassium carbonate	Commercial kitchens
ABC dry chemical	Monoammonium phosphate	Paint booths, dip tanks, coating operations, flammable liquid storage areas, paint mixing areas, exhaust ducts
Regular dry chemical	Sodium bicarbonate	Gasoline, propane and solvents, live electrical equipment, flammable liquids
Foam	Synthetic detergent, polysaccharide, fluoroakyl suffaccant	Flammable liquids
Purple K dry chemical	Potassium bicarbonate	High hazard commercial and industrial applications, especially with flammable liquids
Solid aerosol particulate	Potassium nitrate	Used in condensed aerosol fire suppression, high hazard commercial and industrial applications, no ozone depletion or global warming potential
Halotron 1	2,2-dichloro-1,1,1-trifluoroethane	Live electrical equipment, flammable liquids
Water mist	Water	All classes of fire (A, B, C, F): ordinary flammables (Paper, wood, cloth), flammable liquids, kitchen fires (K, F class), electrical fires
Water	Water	Ordinary flammables (Paper, wood, cloth)

== Health and environmental concerns ==
Despite their effectiveness, chemical fire extinguishing agents are not without disadvantages. In the early 20th century, carbon tetrachloride was extensively used as a dry cleaning solvent, a refrigerant and as a fire extinguishing agent. In time, it was found carbon tetrachloride could lead to severe health effects. From the mid-1960s Halon 1301 was the industry standard for protecting high-value assets from the threat of fire. Halon 1301 had many benefits as a fire suppression agent; it is fast-acting, safe for assets and required minimal storage space. Halon 1301's major drawbacks are that it depletes atmospheric ozone and is potentially harmful to humans. Since 1987, some 191 nations have signed The Montreal Protocol on Substances That Deplete the Ozone Layer. The Protocol is an international treaty designed to protect the ozone layer by phasing out the production of a number of substances believed to be responsible for ozone depletion. Among these were halogenated hydrocarbons often used in fire suppression. As a result, manufacturers have focused on alternatives to Halon 1301 and Halon 1211 (halogenated hydrocarbons). A number of countries have also taken steps to mandate the removal of installed Halon systems. Most notably these include Germany and Australia, the first two countries in the world to require this action. In both of these countries complete removal of installed Halon systems has been completed except for a very few essential-use applications. The European Union is currently undergoing a similar mandated removal of installed Halon systems.

== History ==
The first fire extinguisher patent was issued to Alanson Crane of Virginia on Feb. 10, 1863. The first fire sprinkler system was patented by H.W. Pratt in 1872. But the first practical automatic sprinkler system was invented in 1874 by Henry S. Parmalee of New Haven, CT. He installed the system in a piano factory he owned.

== Modern systems ==
Since the early 1990s manufacturers have successfully developed safe and effective Halon alternatives. These include DuPont's FM-200, American Pacific's Halotron, FirePro's FPC Compound, Plumis’ Automist and 3M's Novec 1230 Fire Protection Fluid. Generally, the Halon replacement agents available today fall into two broad categories, in-kind (gaseous extinguishing agents) or not in-kind (alternative technologies). In-kind gaseous agents generally fall into two further categories, halocarbons and inert gases. Not in-kind alternatives include such options as water mist or the use of early warning smoke detection systems.
