= 1,1,1,2,3,3,3-Heptafluoropropane =

- The structure of 1,1,1,2,3,3,3-heptafluoropropane

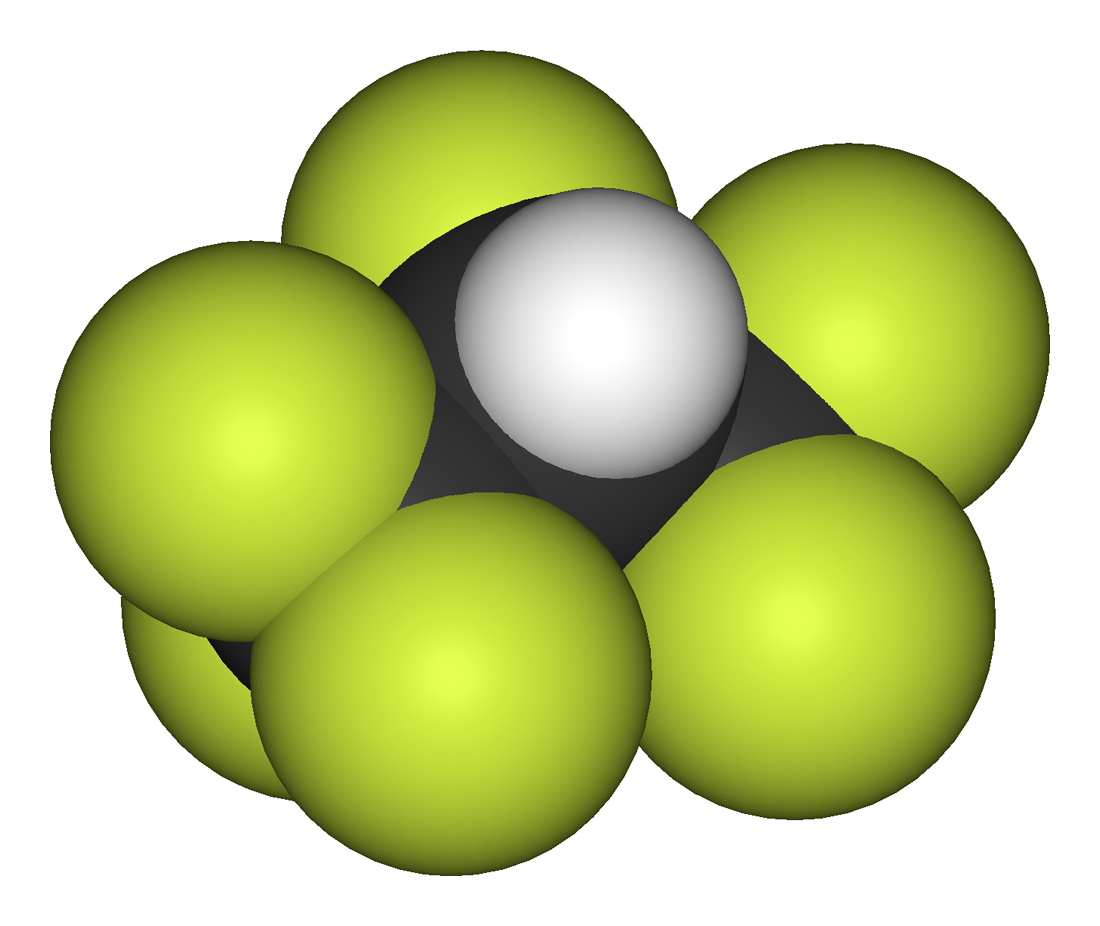
- Heptafluoropropane

Names
- Preferred IUPAC name 1,1,1,2,3,3,3-Heptafluoropropane
- Other names Heptafluoropropane; Apaflurane; HFC-227ea; R-227ea; HFC-227; FM-200

Identifiers
CAS Number	431-89-0
3D model (JSmol)	Interactive image
ChEMBL	ChEMBL2104472
ChemSpider	61257
ECHA InfoCard	100.006.437
KEGG	D10216
PubChem CID	67940
UNII	R40P36GDK6
UN number	UN3296
CompTox Dashboard (EPA)	DTXSID4042048
- InChI: InChI=1S/C3HF7/c4-1(2(5,6)7)3(8,9)10/h1H Key: YFMFNYKEUDLDTL-UHFFFAOYSA-N; InChI=1/C3HF7/c4-1(2(5,6)7)3(8,9)10/h1H Key: YFMFNYKEUDLDTL-UHFFFAOYAL
- SMILES: FC(F)(F)C(F)C(F)(F)F

Properties
Chemical formula	C_{3}HF_{7}
Molar mass	170.03 g/mol
Density	1.46 g/cm^{3} at −16 °C
Melting point	−131 °C (−204 °F; 142 K)
Boiling point	−16.4 °C (2.5 °F; 256.8 K)

Hazards
NFPA 704 (fire diamond)	1 0 1

Related compounds
Related compounds	1,1,1,2,2,3,3-Heptachloropropane
- Except where otherwise noted, data are given for materials in their standard state (at 25 °C [77 °F], 100 kPa). verify (what is ?) Infobox references

1,1,1,2,3,3,3-Heptafluoropropane, also called heptafluoropropane, HFC-227ea (ISO name), HFC-227 or FM-200, as well as apaflurane (INN), is a colourless, odourless gaseous halocarbon commonly used as a gaseous fire suppression agent.

== Chemistry ==
Its chemical formula is CF_{3}-CHF-CF_{3}, or C_{3}HF_{7}. With a boiling point of −16.4 °C, it is a gas at room temperature. It is slightly soluble in water (260 mg/L).

== Use ==
HFC-227ea is used in fire suppression systems that protect data processing and telecommunication facilities, and in fire suppression of many flammable liquids and gases. HFC-227ea is categorized as a Clean Agent and is governed by NFPA 2001 - Standard for Clean Agent Fire Extinguishing Systems. Effective fire suppression requires introducing a concentration of the HFC-227ea agent between 6.25% and 9% depending on the hazard being suppressed. Its NOAEL for cardiac sensitization is 9%. The United States Environmental Protection Agency allows concentration of 9% volume in occupied spaces without mandated egress time, or up to 10.5% for a limited time. Most fire suppression systems are designed to provide concentration of 6.25-9%.

The HFC-227ea fire suppression agent was the first non-ozone-depleting replacement for Halon 1301. In addition, HFC-227ea leaves no residue on valuable equipment after discharge.

HFC-227ea contains no chlorine or bromine atoms, presenting no ozone depletion effect. Its atmospheric lifetime is approximated between 31 and 42 years. It leaves no residue or oily deposits and can be removed by ventilation of the affected space.

As an aerosol propellant, HFC-227ea is used in pharmaceutical metered dose inhalers such as those used for dispensing asthma medication.

== Safety ==
At high temperatures, heptafluoropropane will decompose and produce a small quantity of hydrogen fluoride. Other decomposition products include carbonyl fluoride, carbon monoxide and carbon dioxide. Explosive damage to heptafluoropropane-containing fire suppression systems in military vehicles, resulting in the production of hydrogen fluoride, has been reported in the medical literature to cause severe injury and death among exposed individuals.

Prior to re-entry of a room where HFC-227ea system has been activated to suppress a fire, the atmosphere should be tested. An Acid Scavenging Additive added to heptafluoropropane reduces the amount of hydrogen fluoride. Contact with liquid HFC-227ea may cause frostbite.

== Climate change considerations ==
Heptafluoropropane (HFC-227ea) contributes to climate change. It has a global warming potential (GWP) of 3,220 over 100 years.

Due to its high GWP, the HFC-227ea has been included in the list of controlled substances of the Montreal Protocol (2016 Kigali Amendment, in effect in January 2019). Under EU regulations, production, imports and sales of HFC-227ea in spray cans such as freeze sprays or dusters have been prohibited since 2014, as the GWP is over the limit of 150 for these applications.

== Tradenames for HFC-227ea used as fire suppression agent ==
- FE-227 FM-200 (Dupont) (United States Environmental Protection Agency (EPA) SNAP Listed)
- FITECH - 227 (Fitech Engineers)
- Solkaflam 227 (Solvay Fluor)
- MH-227 (Shanghai Waysmos) (United States Environmental Protection Agency (EPA) SNAP Listed)
- Orient 227 (Orient Corporation) (United States Environmental Protection Agency (EPA) SNAP Listed)
- SR-200 (SRI)
- NAF S 227(Safety High Tech)

== Gallery ==
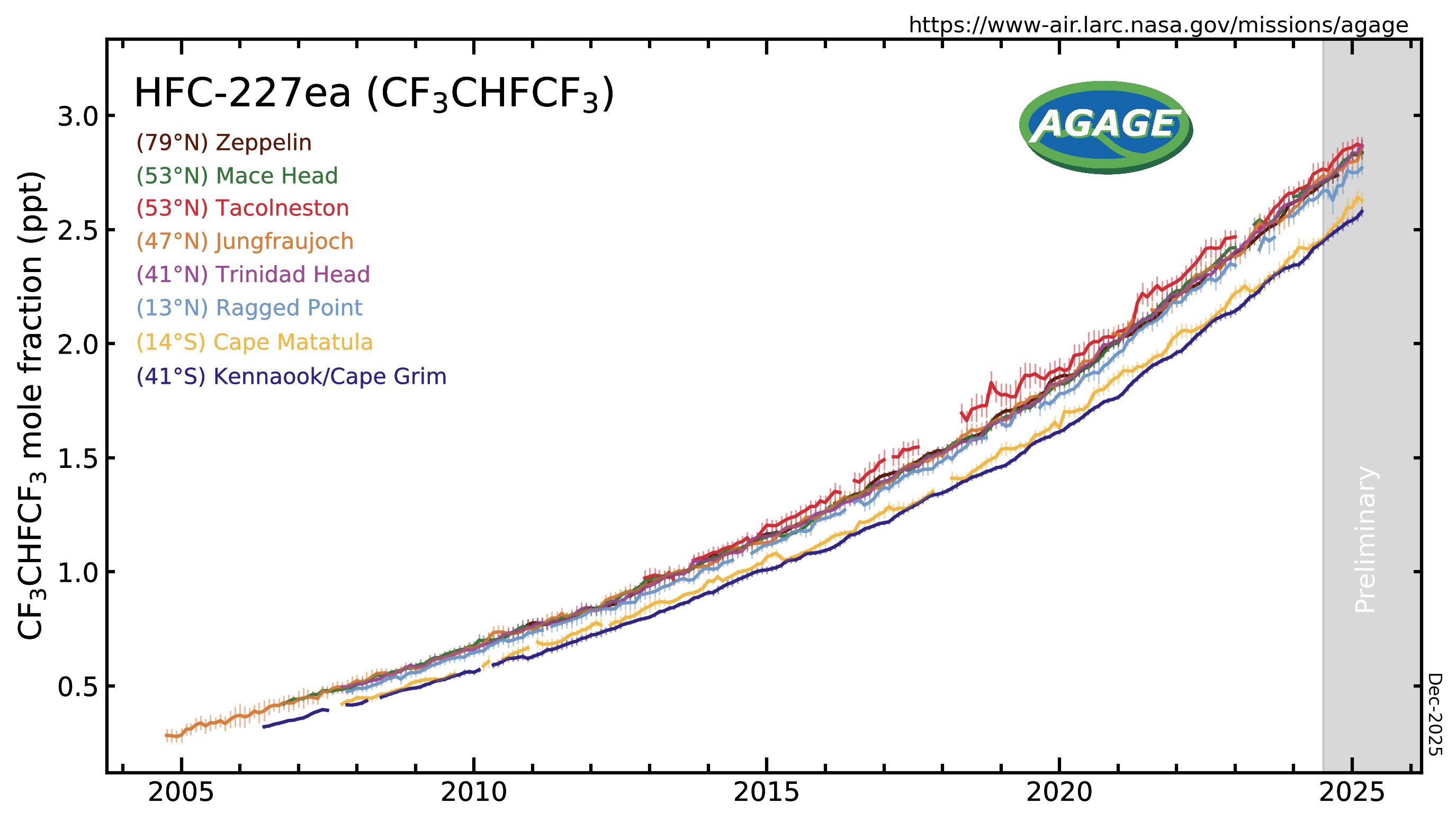
HFC-227ea measured by the Advanced Global Atmospheric Gases Experiment (AGAGE) in the lower atmosphere (troposphere) at stations around the world. Abundances are given as pollution free monthly mean mole fractions in parts-per-trillion.

== See also ==
Other fire suppression agents:

- Argonite
- ECARO-25
- FE-13
- FK-5-1-12
- FS49C2
- Halon 1211
- Halon 1301
- HFC-125
