= Freon =

Registered trade name for halocarbon products

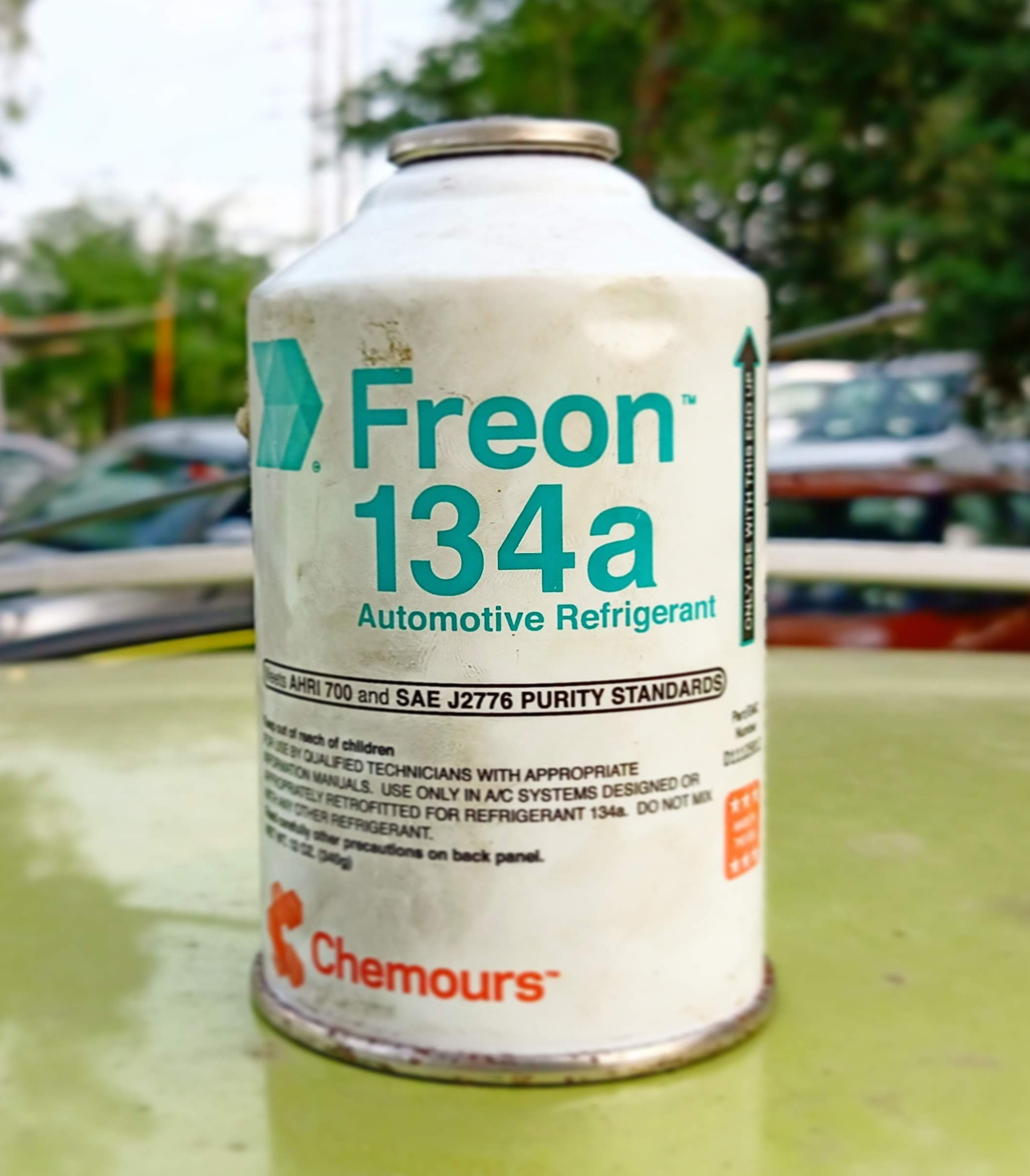
A can of 1,1,1,2-Tetrafluoroethane (Freon 134a) used for recharging vehicle air conditioning

Freon (/ˈfriːɒn/ FREE-on) is a registered trademark of Chemours and generic descriptor for a number of halocarbon products. They are stable, nonflammable, low toxicity gases or liquids which have generally been used as refrigerants and as aerosol propellants. They include chlorofluorocarbons (CFCs) and hydrofluorocarbons (HFCs), both of which cause ozone depletion (although the latter much less so) and contribute to global warming. "Freon" is the brand name for the refrigerants R-12, R-13B1, R-22, R-410A, R-502, and R-503 manufactured by Chemours. They emit a strong smell similar to acetone. Freon has been found to cause damage to human health when inhaled in large amounts. Studies have been conducted in the pursuit to find beneficial reuses for gases under the Freon umbrella as an alternative to disposal.

== History ==
The first CFCs were synthesized by Frédéric Swarts in the 1890s. In the late 1920s, a research team was formed by Charles Franklin Kettering at General Motors to find a replacement for the dangerous refrigerants then in use, such as ammonia. The team was headed by Thomas Midgley Jr. In 1928, they improved the synthesis of CFCs and demonstrated their usefulness for such a purpose and their stability and nontoxicity. Kettering patented a refrigerating apparatus to use the gas; this was issued to Frigidaire, a wholly owned subsidiary of General Motors.

In 1930, General Motors and DuPont formed Kinetic Chemicals to produce Freon. Their product was dichlorodifluoromethane and is designated "Freon-12", "R-12", or "CFC-12". The number after the R is a refrigerant class number developed by DuPont to systematically identify single halogenated hydrocarbons, as well as other refrigerants besides halocarbons.

Most uses of CFCs have since been banned or severely restricted by the Montreal Protocol of August 1987, as they have been shown to be responsible for ozone depletion. Brands of Freon containing HFCs instead have replaced many uses, but they, too, are under strict control under the Kyoto Protocol, as they are deemed "super-greenhouse effect" gases.

== Health effects ==
Freon, when used as an inhalant, has been found to have effects such as euphoria or intoxication. This has led to some individuals using Freon recreationally in order to achieve these effects. When inhaled, Freon has toxic effects that can have detrimental impacts on various systems in the body. These effects can damage the brain and the cardiovascular system, potentially causing abnormalities in heart functions as well as seizures. Freon inhalation can also cause damage to the lungs and in rare cases, respiratory failure. Injury of the lungs due to Freon inhalation is known as hydrocarbon pneumonitis.

== See also ==
- Chlorodifluoromethane (R-22 or HCFC-22), a type of Freon.
- Dichlorodifluoromethane (R-12 or CFC-12), the most commonly used Freon brand refrigerant prior to its ban in many countries in 1996 and total ban in 2010.
- 1,1,1,2-Tetrafluoroethane (R-134a or HFC-134a), one of the main replacements for the formerly widespread R-12.
- Opteon, halogenated olefins have replaced Freons in many applications.
