= C2HCl2F3 =

The molecular formula C_{2}HCl_{2}F_{3} (molar mass: 152.93 g/mol, exact mass: 151.9407 u) may refer to:

- 2,2-Dichloro-1,1,1-trifluoroethane
- 1,2-Dichloro-1,1,2-trifluoroethane
