= Halotron I =

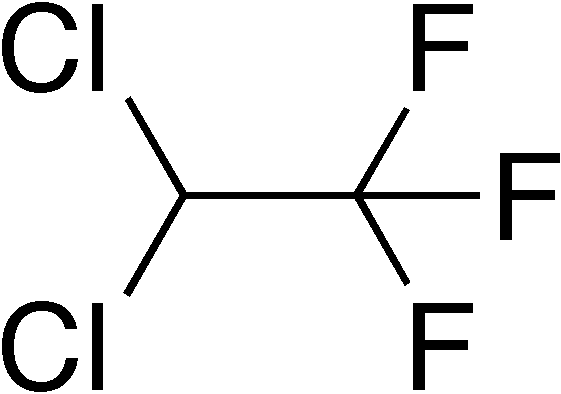

- Chemical structures of dichlorotrifluoroethane (top) and tetrafluormethane (bottom), the two major components of Halotron I

Hazards
- GHS labelling
Pictograms	(GHS07: Exclamation mark) (GHS04: Compressed Gas)
NFPA 704 (fire diamond)	1 0 1
- Lethal dose or concentration (LD, LC)
LC_{50} (median concentration)	3.2% (4 hrs, inhalation)
Safety data sheet (SDS)	Halotron
- Except where otherwise noted, data are given for materials in their standard state (at 25 °C [77 °F], 100 kPa). Infobox references

Halotron I is a fire extinguishing agent primarily composed of a raw material HCFC-123 (93%), mixed with tetrafluoromethane and argon serving as propellants.

== Global emission concerns ==
Halotron I was originally introduced in 1992 as a replacement for Halon 1211 (bromochlorodifluoromethane), a substance known for its significant ozone-depleting properties. While Halon 1211 has a global warming potential (GWP) of 2,070, Halotron I's GWP is considerably lower at 77, reflecting a 96% reduction in environmental impact.

It has an ozone depletion potential (ODP) of no more than 0.016, which is much lower compared to Halon 1211, which have an ODP rating above 4.0 and Halon 1301 (bromotrifluoromethane) which has an ODP about 13.0.

== Performance ==
Halotron I has been approved by the Environmental Protection Agency for use on class A, B, and C fires (flammable solids, flammable liquids, and electrical fires).

In December 2011, Halotron I underwent testing for "hidden fire" suppression, inspired by the demonstrated effectiveness of Halon 1211 in controlling an in-flight fire aboard a Delta L-1011 on March 17, 1991. The test was conducted at UL, and showed that Halotron I offered similar effectiveness as Halon 1211, but with significantly less harm to both humans and the environment. However, achieving the same fire suppression ratings require a higher volume of Halotron I compared to Halon 1211.

== DOT classification ==
UN1956, Compressed Gases, N.O.S., Nonflammable Gas. IMCO CLASS: 2.2
