= Bromochlorodifluoromethane =

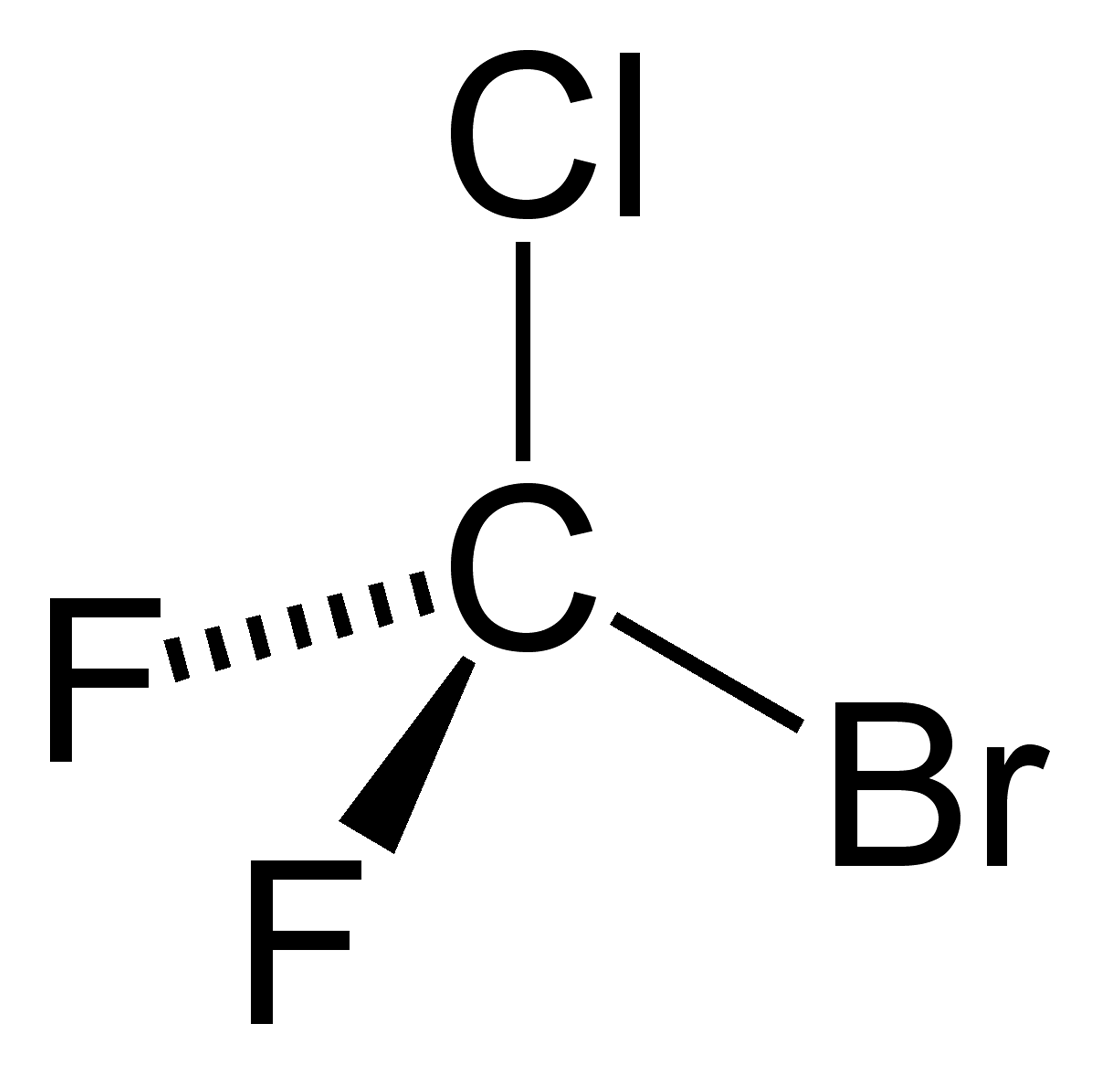

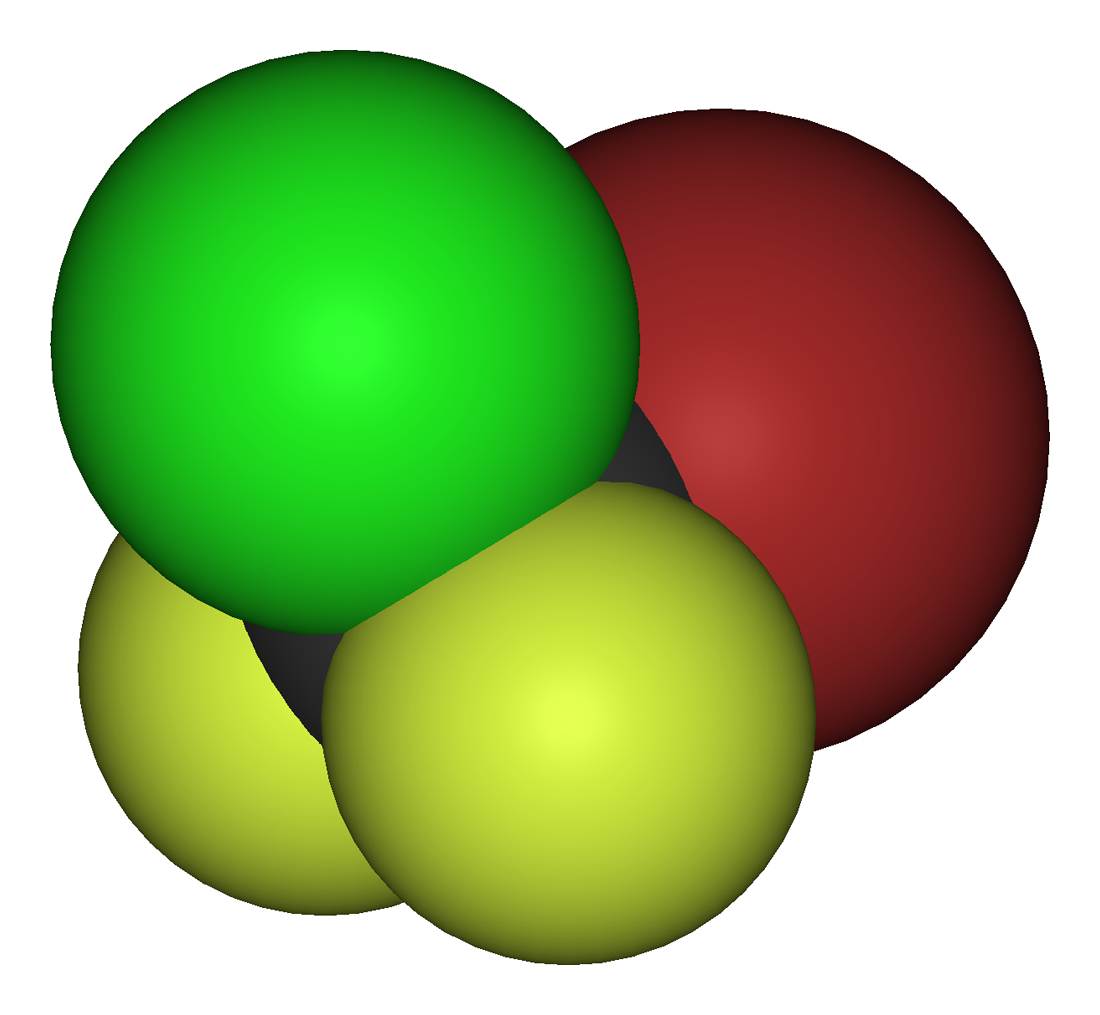

Names
- Preferred IUPAC name Bromo(chloro)difluoromethane
- Other names Bromochlorodifluoromethane; Halon 1211; Halon 1211 BCF; BCF; Freon 12B1

Identifiers
CAS Number	353-59-3
3D model (JSmol)	Interactive image
ChEBI	CHEBI:84698
ChemSpider	9248
ECHA InfoCard	100.005.944
EC Number	206-537-9
PubChem CID	9625
UNII	91I5X8AJXS
CompTox Dashboard (EPA)	DTXSID0027147
- InChI: InChI=1S/CBrClF2/c2-1(3,4)5 Key: MEXUFEQDCXZEON-UHFFFAOYSA-N; InChI=1/CBrClF2/c2-1(3,4)5
- SMILES: BrC(Cl)(F)F

Properties
Chemical formula	CBrClF_{2}
Molar mass	165.36 g/mol
Appearance	Colorless gas
Density	7,1362 kg·m^{−3} (15 °C, 1 bar)
Melting point	−159.5 °C (−255.1 °F; 113.6 K)
Boiling point	−3.7 °C (25.3 °F; 269.4 K)
- Except where otherwise noted, data are given for materials in their standard state (at 25 °C [77 °F], 100 kPa). verify (what is ?) Infobox references

Bromochlorodifluoromethane (BCF), also referred to by the code numbers Halon 1211 and Freon 12B1, is a haloalkane with the chemical formula CF_{2}ClBr. It is used for fire suppression, especially for expensive equipment or items that could be damaged by the residue from other types of extinguishers. It is stored as a liquid under pressure and vaporizes when discharged to suppress fires. The use of halons, including Halon 1211, has decreased over time due to their adverse impact on the ozone layer. Alternatives have been developed to mitigate environmental concerns while still providing effective fire suppression capabilities.

== Use as a fire extinguishing agent ==
Brominated haloalkanes were first used during World War II in fire extinguishers for aircraft and tanks. BCF was introduced as an effective gaseous fire suppression agent in the mid-1960s for use around highly valuable materials in places such as museums, mainframe rooms, and telecommunication switching centers. BCFs were also widely used in the maritime industries in the engine rooms of ships and also in the transport industry in vehicles. Its efficiency as a fire extinguishing agent has also led it to be the predominant choice of fire extinguishing agent on commercial aircraft and is typically found in cylindrical hand-held canisters. Its advantages as a fire extinguishing agent are that it has lower toxicity than chemicals such as carbon tetrachloride and that since it is a covalently bonded compound, it does not form conductive ions, therefore being usable on electrical equipment.

BCF is an excellent fire extinguishing agent, as it is a streaming agent with low toxicity, a low pressure, liquefied gas, and effective on all common types of fires, A, B, and C. It is mainly used in portable and wheeled extinguishers, and small spot protection units for aviation and marine engine applications, and was never widely used in fixed systems like Halon 1301 was.

BCF has fairly low toxicity. The lethal concentration for 15 minute exposure is about 32%.

== Synthesis ==
BCF is commercially synthesized in a two-step process from chloroform. Chloroform is fluorinated with hydrogen fluoride. The resulting chlorodifluoromethane is then reacted with elemental bromine at 400-600 °C, with reaction time limited to about 3 seconds. The overall yield is over 90%.

=== Regulation ===
The production of BCF and similar chlorofluorocarbons has been banned in most countries since January 1, 1994 as part of the Montreal Protocol on ozone depleting substances. Halon 1211 is also a potent greenhouse gas with a 100-year global warming potential 2,070 times that of carbon dioxide and an atmospheric lifetime of 16.0 years.

Recycling of Halon 1211 allows halon fire extinguishers to remain in use, although parts supply is limited to a few manufacturers. Halon 1211 fire extinguishers are still widely used in the United States with the US military and aviation being major users. The EU banned halon in January 2026 with Halotron BrX serving as the replacement agent for aviation. The manufacture of UL Listed Halon 1211 extinguishers was expected to be halted with UL's withdrawal of UL 1093, UL's legacy standard “Halogenated Agent Fire Extinguishers.” On November 20, 2024, UL released a Certification Bulletin stating that the existing supply of halon could be sold indefinitely under the UL 1093 standard, effectively allowing halon to be recycled and used in fire extinguishers until the remaining supply is depleted. Halotron I, the replacement extinguishing agent, requires a larger volume to achieve effectiveness equal to Halon 1211.

== Gallery ==
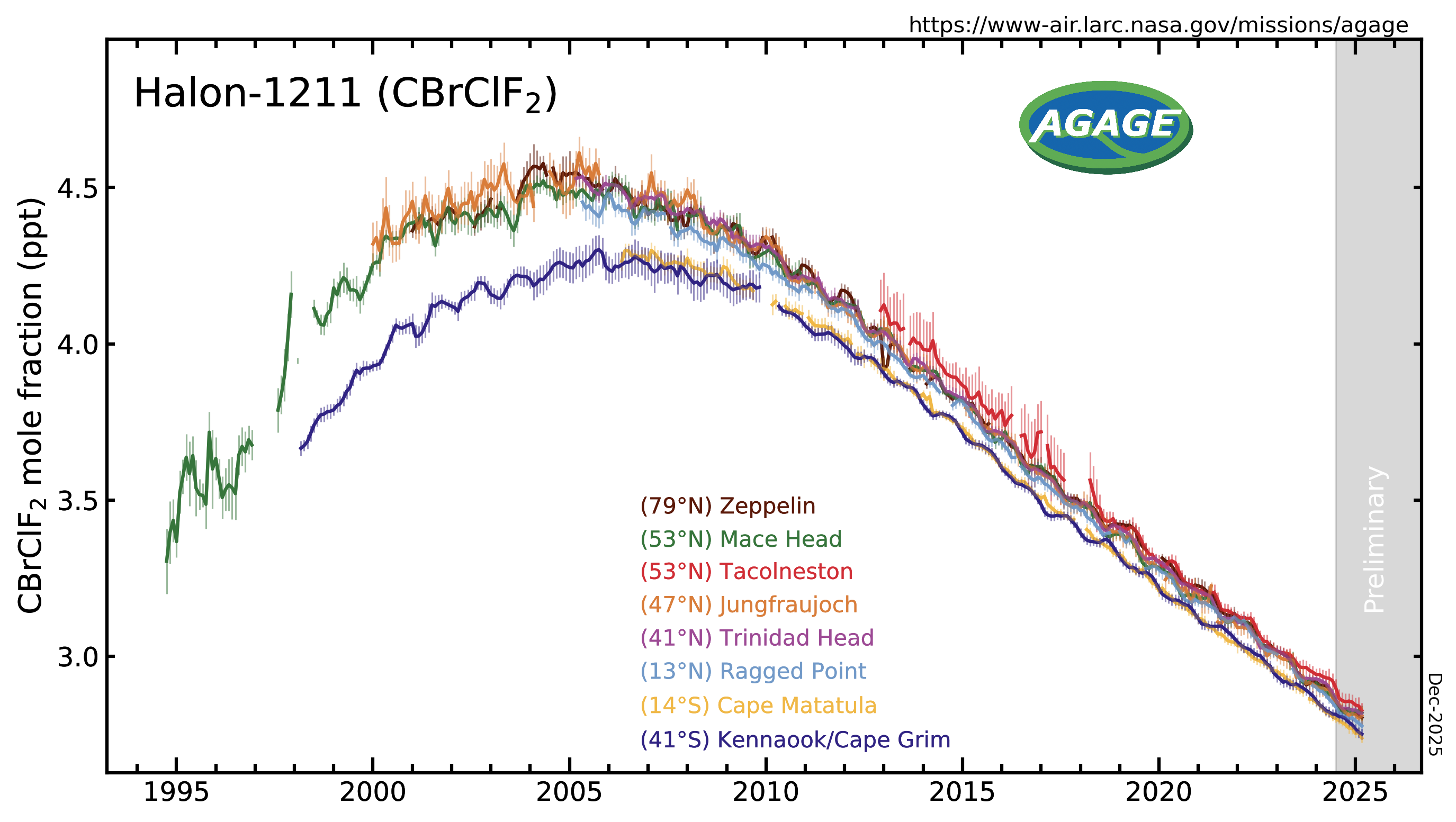
H-1211 measured by the Advanced Global Atmospheric Gases Experiment (AGAGE) in the lower atmosphere (troposphere) at stations around the world. Abundances are given as pollution free monthly mean mole fractions in parts-per-trillion.

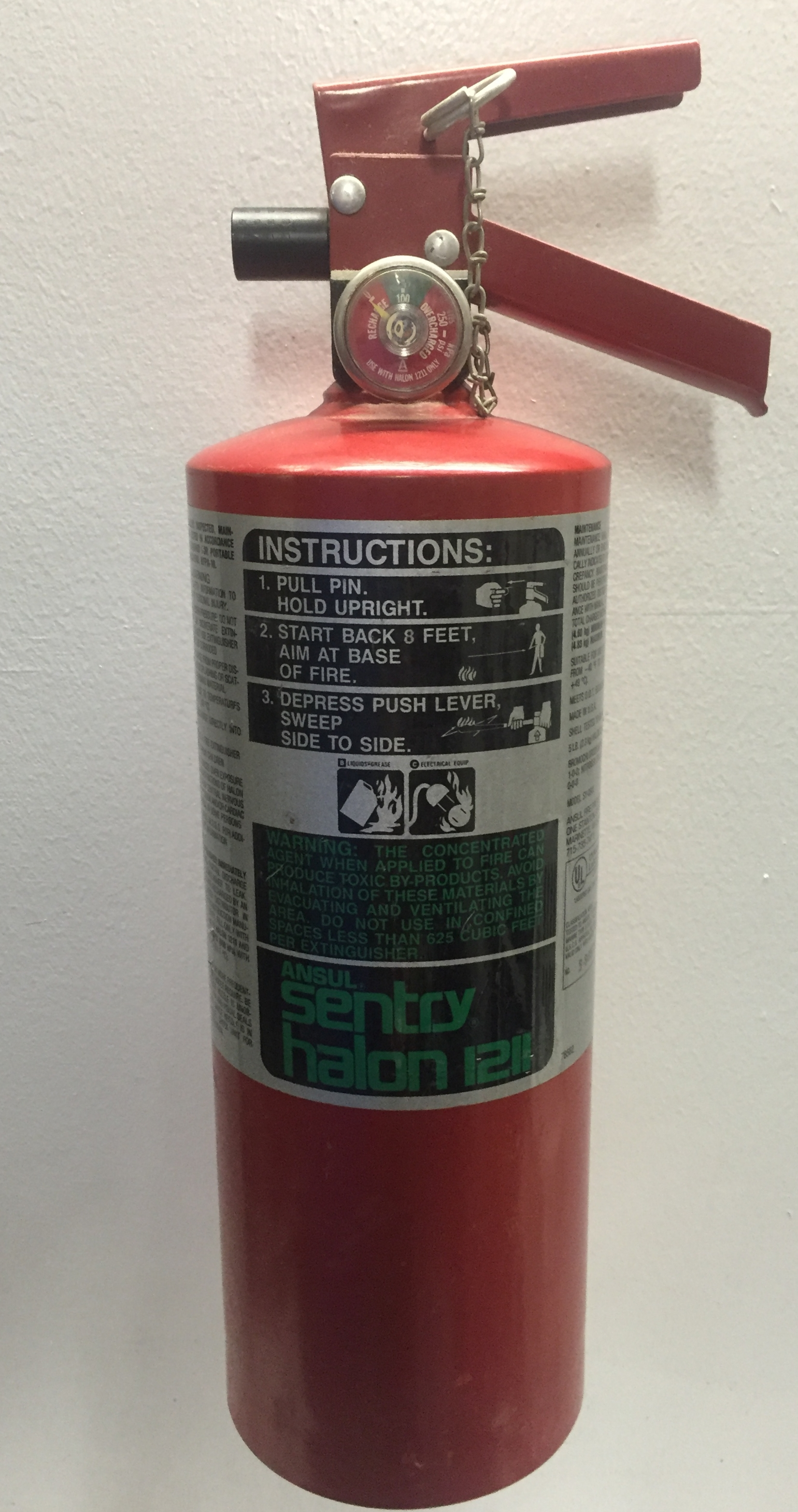
Halon 1211 Fire Extinguisher, USA, early 1990s.

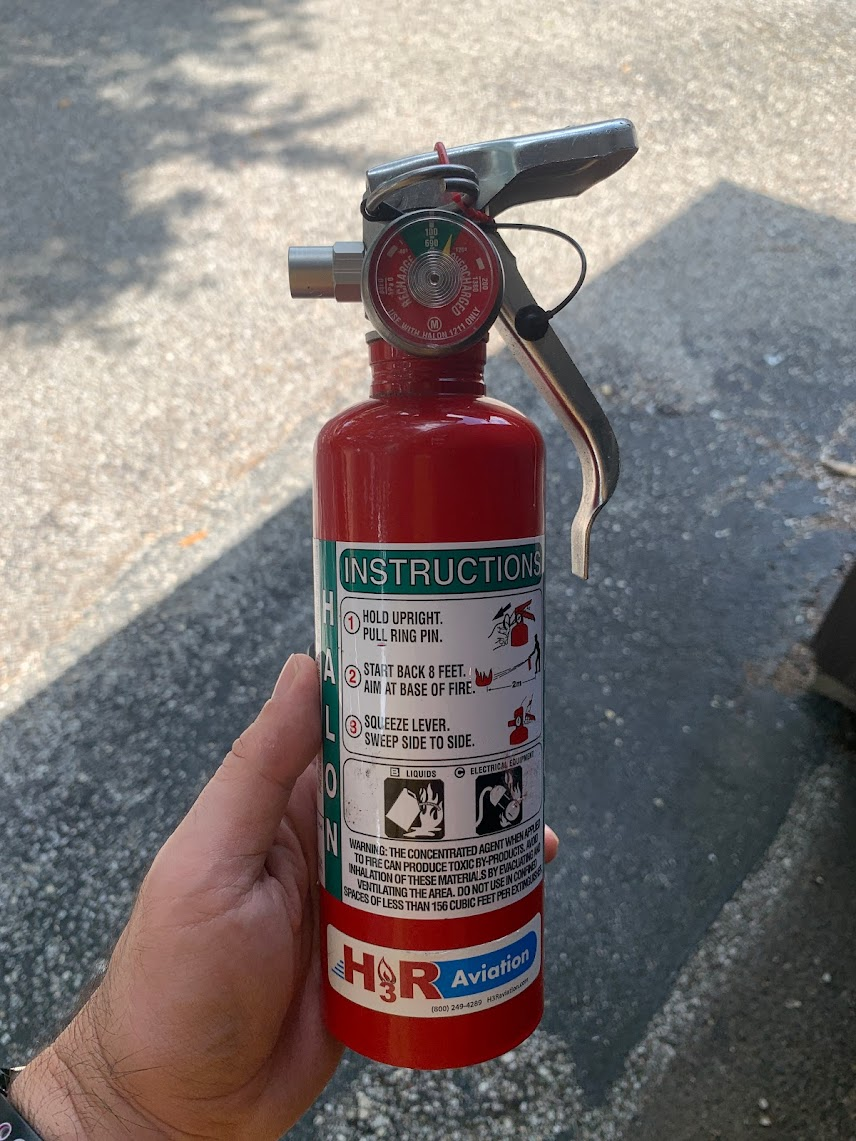
A portable aviation Halon 1211 fire extinguisher, USA, 2015.

== See also ==
- Bromochlorofluoromethane
- Bromotrifluoromethane
- Ozone depletion potential
