= Difluoromethane (data page) =

Chemical data page

This page provides supplementary chemical data on difluoromethane.

Property	Value
Compressibility factor (Z)	0.9863
Heat capacity at constant pressure (C_{p}) at 21 °C (70 °F)	0.043 kJ·mol^{−1}·K^{−1}
Heat capacity at constant volume (C_{V}) at 21 °C (70 °F)	0.034 kJ·mol^{−1}·K^{−1}
Heat capacity ratio (κ)	1.253
