= Clean agent FS 49 C2 =

Fire suppression agent

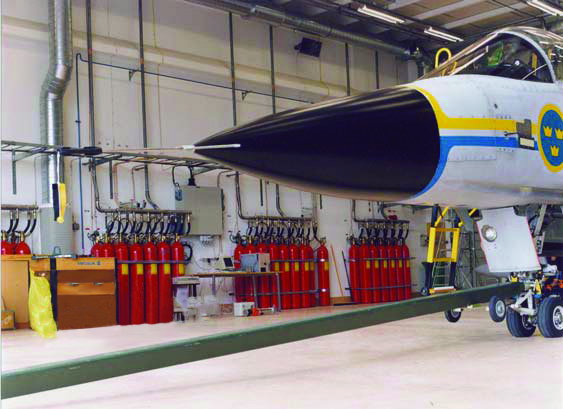
Swedish Air Force Hangar Protected with 7000 kg Clean Agent FS49C2

Clean agent FS 49 C2 is an environmentally engineered, human safe, fast acting Clean Agent fire extinguishing gas for gaseous fire suppression installed in a suited fire suppression system. The gas consists of tetrafluoroethane, pentafluoroethane and carbon dioxide.

FS 49 C2 maintains breathable concentrations of oxygen in the air. It can extinguish a fire with less danger to people in the room at extinguishing concentrations in contrast to pure carbon dioxide based fire suppression system that is deadly to humans when released in extinguishing amounts.

The gas was initially called Halotron II B/FS49C2.

== Thermal fire suppression ==
FS 49 C2 acts similarly to an inert gas. It absorbs the heat produced from the combustion process. This mechanism is consistent with the observation that the fire heat release rate does not decrease until sufficient gas is released.

The difference from inert gases and FS 49 C2 is that it takes less gas to suppress a fire, and therefore gas storage takes less space, depending on the storage pressure. Savings may vary between a 50-90%.

== Composition ==
It is a gaseous mixture of 60-80% tetrafluoroethane (R-134a), 10-30% pentafluoroethane (R-125) and 10-30% carbon dioxide (CO_{2}).

Its physical properties are similar to those of Halon 1301.

== Halon comparison ==
FS 49 C2 is believed to cause less damage to the environment. Its main component is the most widely used replacement gas for refrigeration systems, characterized by zero Ozone Depletion Potential (ODP) factor. FS 49 C2 is suitable to replace Halon 1301 as a "drop in" upgrade of existing Halon systems.

Filling a room 12% by FS 49 C2 is sufficient to suppress a flame-based fire.

Even though FS 49 C2 gas does not leave toxic gases behind, a self-contained breathing apparatus is recommended when in a fire site because in the process of extinguishing the fire, FS 49 C2 may release potentially harmful gases.

== Montreal protocol ==
UNEP banned the use of Halon gases in the Montreal Protocol treaty in 1987 due to ozone depletion and the ozone-depleting effect of Halon gases. Developing countries were granted an extension to still use Halon until 2010. After 2010 UNEP recommended that those countries replace Halon with ozone friendly alternatives.
