= Bromo(chloro)fluoro(iodo)silane =

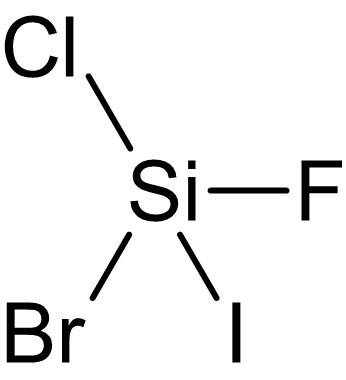

Names
- IUPAC name Bromo-chloro-fluoro-iodosilane
- Other names Fluorochlorobromoiodosilane, bromochlorofluoroiodosilane

Identifiers
CAS Number	34979-68-5
3D model (JSmol)	Interactive image
ChemSpider	10328923
PubChem CID	23235918
- InChI: InChI=1S/BrClFISi/c1-5(2,3)4 Key: PJYMBROHOATMNE-UHFFFAOYSA-N
- SMILES: F[Si](Cl)(Br)I

Properties
Chemical formula	BrClFISi
Molar mass	289.34 g·mol^{−1}
Appearance	colorless solid
Density	2.558 g/cm^{3}
Solubility in water	reacts with water

Related compounds
Related compounds	Bromochlorofluoroiodomethane
- Except where otherwise noted, data are given for materials in their standard state (at 25 °C [77 °F], 100 kPa). Infobox references

Bromo(chloro)fluoro(iodo)silane is a complex inorganic compound of bromine, chlorine, fluorine, iodine, and silicon with the chemical formula SiIBrClF. This is a chiral molecule.

== Preparation ==
It can be prepared by prolonged heating of a mixture of fluoride-chloride-dibromide of silicon SiFClBr_{2} and triiodosilane SiHI_{3} at 100 °C, followed by separation of the halide mixture by fractional distillation.

== Physical properties ==
The compound is a colorless solid, that reacts with water.
