= Bromochlorofluoromethane =

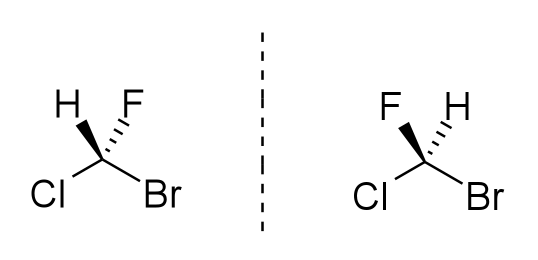
- Left: (S)-Bromochlorofluoromethane; Right: (R)-Bromochlorofluoromethane

Names
- Preferred IUPAC name Bromo(chloro)fluoromethane
- Other names Bromochlorofluoromethane

Identifiers
CAS Number	593-98-6
3D model (JSmol)	Interactive image
ChemSpider	71390
PubChem CID	79058
UNII	9RH760PZ3L
CompTox Dashboard (EPA)	DTXSID70870651
- InChI: InChI=1S/CHBrClF/c2-1(3)4/h1H Key: YNKZSBSRKWVMEZ-UHFFFAOYSA-N
- SMILES: C(F)(Cl)Br

Properties
Chemical formula	CHBrClF
Molar mass	147.37 g·mol^{−1}
Density	1.953 g/cm^{3}
Melting point	−115 °C; −175 °F; 158 K
Boiling point	36 °C; 97 °F; 309 K
- Except where otherwise noted, data are given for materials in their standard state (at 25 °C [77 °F], 100 kPa). Infobox references

Bromochlorofluoromethane or fluorochlorobromomethane, is a chemical compound and trihalomethane derivative with the chemical formula CHBrClF. As one of the simplest possible stable chiral compounds, it is useful for fundamental research into this area of chemistry. However, its relative instability to hydrolysis, and lack of suitable functional groups, made separation of the enantiomers of bromochlorofluoromethane especially challenging, and this was not accomplished until almost a century after it was first synthesised, in March 2005, though it has now been done by a variety of methods. More recent research using bromochlorofluoromethane has focused on its potential use for experimental measurement of parity violation, a major unsolved problem in quantum physics. For example, the S enantiomer is predicted to be lower in energy by about 2.356×10^{−16} eV (56.97 mHz), and the frequency of the C^{−}F vibrational mode should be about 2.4 mHz lower for the R-enantiomer.

== See also ==
- Bromochlorodifluoromethane, used in fire extinguishers
- Bromochlorofluoroiodomethane, a theoretical derivative with iodine replacing the hydrogen
