= Bromochlorofluoroiodomethane =

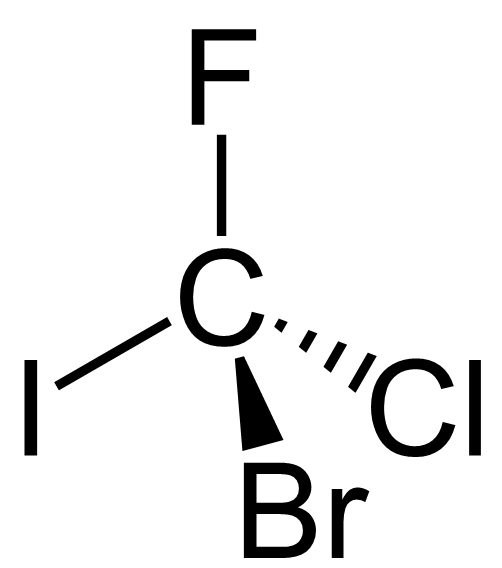
Stereo, skeletal formula of bromochlorofluoroiodomethane (R)
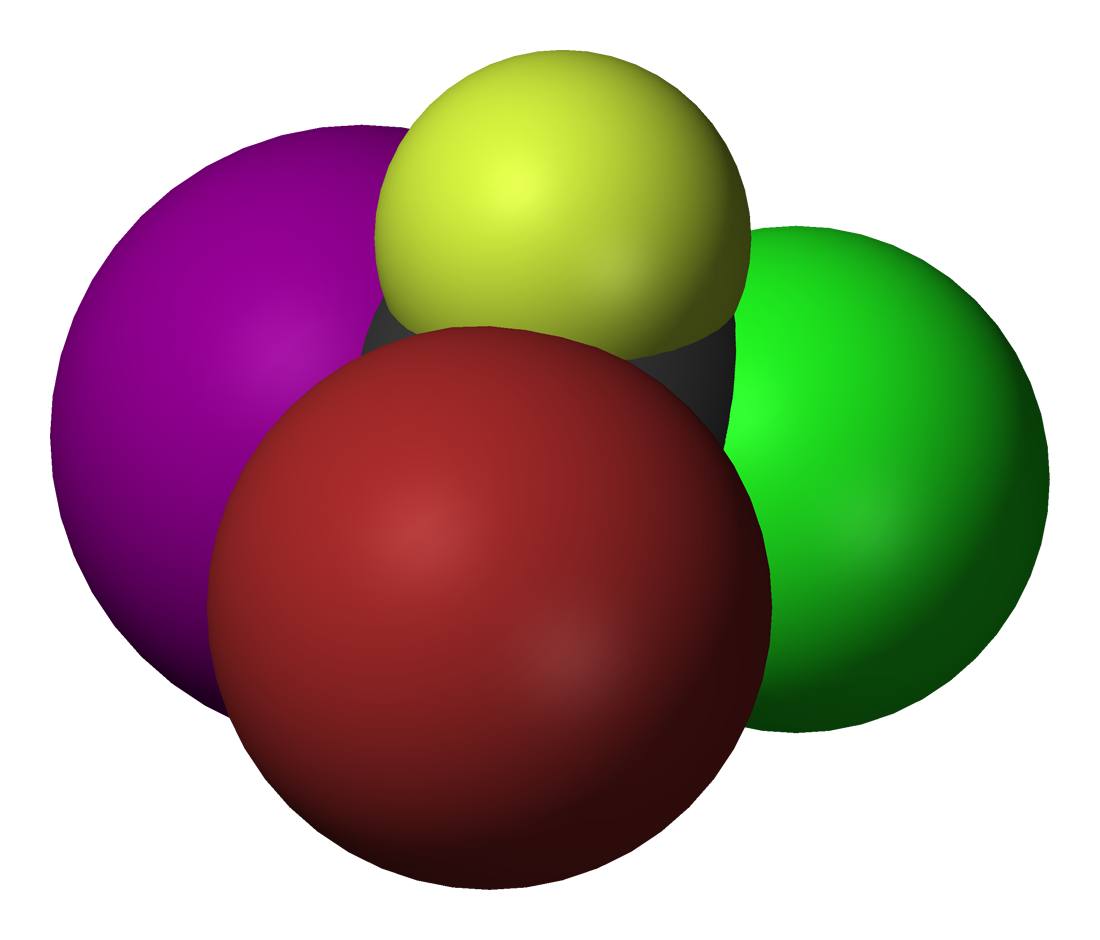
Spacefill model of bromochlorofluoroiodomethane (R)
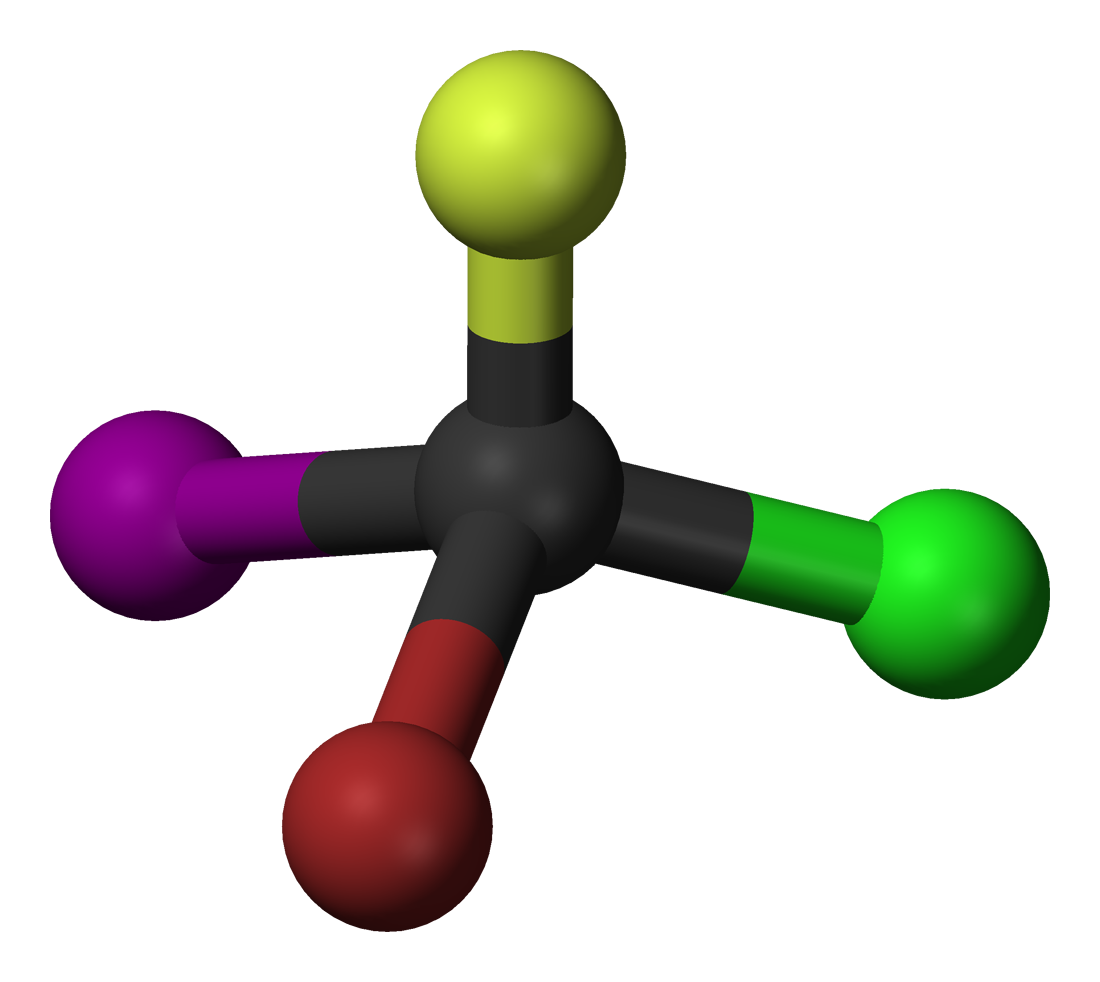
- Ball and stick model of bromochlorofluoroiodomethane (R)

Names
- Preferred IUPAC name Bromo(chloro)fluoro(iodo)methane
- Other names Bromochlorofluoroiodomethane

Identifiers
CAS Number	753-65-1
3D model (JSmol)	Interactive image
ChemSpider	24590921
PubChem CID	57424940
CompTox Dashboard (EPA)	DTXSID70726341
- InChI: InChI=1S/CBrClFI/c2-1(3,4)5 Key: XEGUVFFZWHRVAV-UHFFFAOYSA-N
- SMILES: FC(Cl)(Br)I

Properties
Chemical formula	CBrClFI
Molar mass	273.27 g·mol^{−1}
- Except where otherwise noted, data are given for materials in their standard state (at 25 °C [77 °F], 100 kPa). verify (what is ?) Infobox references

Bromochlorofluoroiodomethane is a hypothetical haloalkane with all four stable halogen substituents present in it.

== Overview ==
This compound can be seen as a methane molecule, whose four hydrogen atoms are each replaced with a different halogen atom. As the mirror images of this molecule are not superimposable, the molecule has two enantiomers. As one of the simplest such molecules, it is often cited as the prototypical chiral compound. However, since there is no synthetic route known to produce bromochlorofluoroiodomethane, the related simple chiral compound bromochlorofluoromethane is used instead when such a compound is required for research.

Of the chiral halomethanes it has been calculated to have the second lowest thermodynamic stability with only CHClBrI being lower.

== See also ==
- Bromochlorofluoroiodosilane — silicon analog
