= R-454B =

Refrigerant

R-454B, also known by the trademarked names Opteon XL41, Solstice 454B, and Puron Advance, is a zeotropic blend of 68.9 percent difluoromethane (R-32), a hydrofluorocarbon, and 31.1 percent 2,3,3,3-tetrafluoropropene (R-1234yf), a hydrofluoroolefin. Because of its reduced global warming potential (GWP), R-454B is intended to be an alternative to refrigerant R-410A in new equipment. R-454B has a GWP of 466, which is 78 percent lower than R-410A's GWP of 2088.

R-454B is non-toxic and mildly flammable, with an ASHRAE safety classification of A2L. In the United States, it is expected to be packaged in a container that is red or has a red band on the shoulder or top. These containers are supplied with a left-hand thread valve to prevent cross-contamination.

There is a shortage of R-454B in the United States as of May 2025.

== History ==
The refrigeration industry has been seeking replacements for R-410A because of its high global warming potential. R-454B, formerly known as DL-5A, has been selected by several manufacturers.

R-454B was developed at and is manufactured by Chemours. Carrier first announced introduction of R-454B in ducted residential and light commercial packaged refrigeration and air conditioning products in 2018, with R-454B-based products launches starting in 2023.

== Related refrigerants ==
R-454B is not the only blend of R-32 and R-1234yf to be proposed as a refrigerant. Other blends include R-454A (35 percent R-32, 65 percent R-1234yf) and R-454C (21.5 percent R-32, 78.5 percent R1234yf). There are also several blends that include a third component.

== See also ==
- R-410A, a refrigerant that is being phased out in some countries, and which R-454B is a popular replacement for
- Difluoromethane, R-32, another R-410A replacement
- List of refrigerants
