= Gaseous fire suppression =

Use of inert gases and chemical agents to extinguish a fire

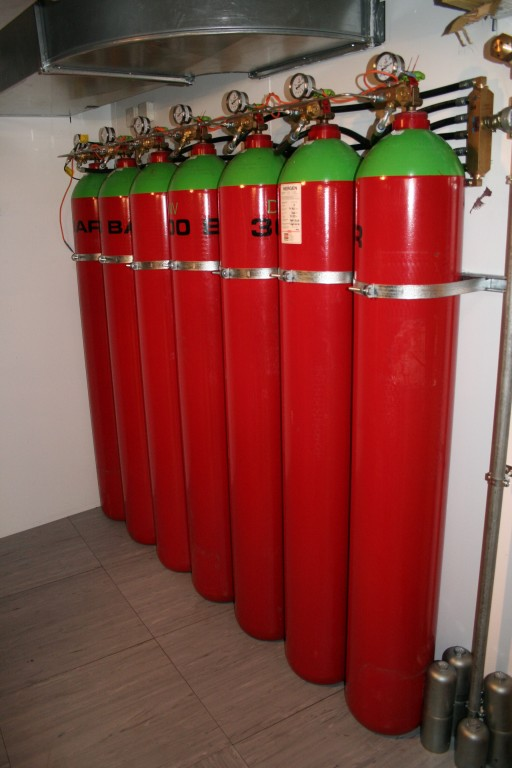
Canisters containing argon gas for use in extinguishing fire in a server room without damaging equipment

Gaseous fire suppression, also called clean agent fire suppression, is the use of inert gases and chemical agents to extinguish a fire. These agents are governed by the National Fire Protection Association (NFPA) Standard for Clean Agent Fire Extinguishing Systems – NFPA 2001 in the US, with different standards and regulations elsewhere. The system typically consists of the agent, agent storage containers, agent release valves, fire detectors, fire detection system (wiring control panel, actuation signaling), agent delivery piping, and agent dispersion nozzles.

== Theory ==
There are four means used by the agents to extinguish a fire. They act on the "fire tetrahedron":

- Reduction or isolation of fuel. No agents currently use this as the primary means of fire suppression.
- Reduction of heat. Representative agents: Clean agent FS 49 C2 (NAF S 227, MH227, FM-200), Novec 1230, pentafluoroethane (NAF S125, ECARO-25).
- Reduction or isolation of oxygen: Representative agents: IG-01 (argon); Argonite / IG-55 (ProInert) (a blend of 50% argon, 50% nitrogen); CO_{2}, carbon dioxide; Inert Gas 541 IG-541 Inergen (a blend of 52% nitrogen, 40% argon, and 8% CO_{2}); and IG-100 (NN100), nitrogen.
- Inhibiting the chain reaction of the above components. Representative agents: FE-13, 1,1,1,2,3,3,3-Heptafluoropropane, FE-25, haloalkanes, bromotrifluoromethane, trifluoroiodomethane, NAF P-IV, NAF S-III, NAF S 125, NAF S 227, and Triodide (Trifluoroiodomethane).

== Application ==
Broadly speaking, there are two methods for applying an extinguishing agent: total flooding and local application:

- Systems working on a total flooding principle apply an extinguishing agent to a room in order to achieve a concentration of the agent (volume percent of the agent in air) adequate to extinguish the fire. These types of systems may be operated automatically by detection and related controls or manually by the operation of a system actuator.
- Systems working on a local application principle apply an extinguishing agent directly onto a fire (usually a two dimensional area), or into the three dimensional region immediately surrounding the substance or object on fire. The main difference in local application from total flooding design is the absence of physical barriers enclosing the fire space.

In the context of automatic extinguishing systems, local application generally refers to the use of systems that have been emplaced some time prior to their usage rather than the use of manually operated wheeled or portable fire extinguishers, although the nature of the agent delivery is similar and many automatic systems may also be activated manually. The lines are blurred somewhat with portable automatic extinguishing systems, although these are not common.

== Safety precautions ==
=== Room integrity testing ===
Room integrity testing (RIT) is also required in conjunction with gas fire suppression systems. RIT ensures that in the event of a fire, the room's containment is sufficient to ensure the effectiveness of the suppression system. RIT works by creating pressure within the room or enclosure where the suppression system has been installed and ensuring that the gas does not escape from the room so quickly that it is unable to extinguish the fire.

=== Suffocation ===
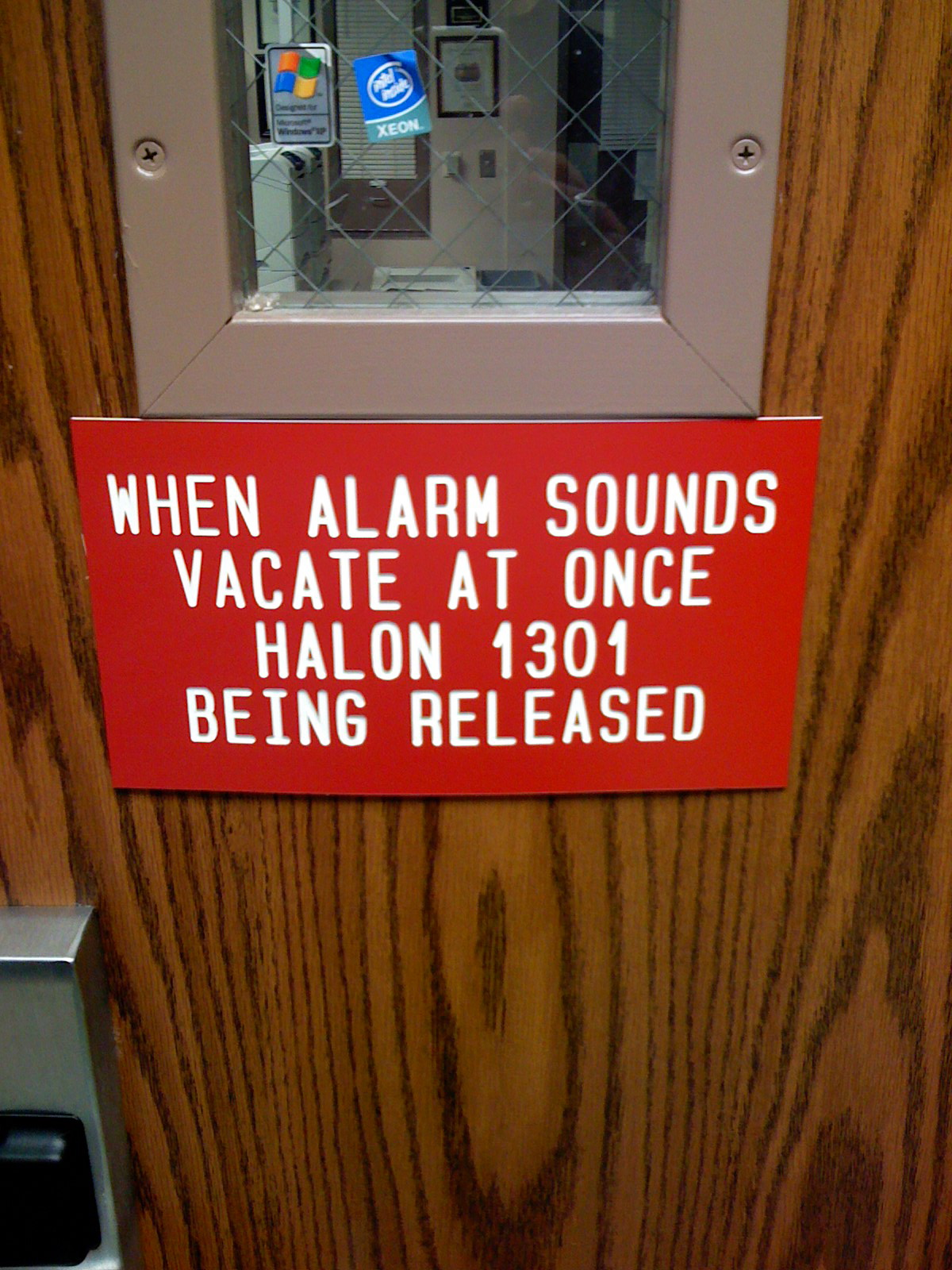
Warning sign for fire suppression system

An extinguishing system which is primarily based on inert gases, such as CO_{2} or nitrogen, in enclosed spaces presents a risk of suffocation. Some incidents have occurred where individuals in these spaces have been killed by inert gas release. When installed according to fire codes the systems have an excellent safety record. To prevent such occurrences, additional life safety systems are typically installed with a warning alarm that precedes the agent release. The warning, usually an audible and visible alert, advises the immediate evacuation of the enclosed space. After a preset time, the agent starts to discharge. This can be paused by activating an abort switch, which pauses the countdown as long as it is activated, allowing everyone to evacuate the area. Accidents have also occurred during maintenance of these systems, so proper safety precautions must be taken beforehand.

The pressure differential caused by these gases may be sufficient to break windows and walls. Pressure vents are mandatory on inert gases and may be required on synthetic agents. These are installed working on the physical strength of the protected space and vary in size.

=== Accidents ===
A study carried out by the Italian Workers' Compensation Authority and the Italian Fire Brigade (Piccolo et al., 2018) reported 12 different accidents caused by inert gas fire suppression systems that in many cases have resulted in serious injuries. From the cases analyzed, it was determined that the over pressure of inert gas systems can constitute a risk even in the presence of a system designed and built according to technical standards. On September 20, 2018, two people died after an inert gas leak from a fire suppression system located in the State Archives in Arezzo (Italy). On 8 July 2013 an explosion of Argonite cylinders tore through a Hertfordshire (U.K.) construction site, killing a plumber and injuring six other workers.

Red Bee Media had a major incident with their broadcast playout facility in London, England, that is used by BBC Television, Channel 4, Channel 5 and ViacomCBS. The broadcasters upload programs and continuity links to Red Bee's servers and then broadcast to tv and online. On 25 September 2021 a gaseous fire suppression system at the facility was triggered, causing loss of service. It was found that an acoustic shock wave from the gas release nozzles had severely damaged the servers resulting in the hard drives being destroyed.

== See also ==
- Fire protection
- Hypoxic air technology for fire prevention
