= 1,2-Dichloro-1,1,2-trifluoroethane =

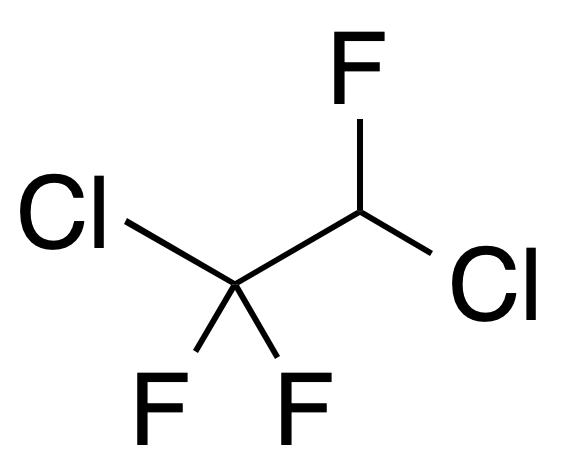

Names
- Preferred IUPAC name 1,2-Dichloro-1,1,2-trifluoroethane
- Other names R-123a

Identifiers
CAS Number	354-23-4
3D model (JSmol)	Interactive image
ChemSpider	9254
ECHA InfoCard	100.005.955
EC Number	206-549-4
PubChem CID	9631
UNII	K8CR1MEG1D
UN number	3163 1078
CompTox Dashboard (EPA)	DTXSID1042021
- InChI: InChI=1S/C2HCl2F3/c3-1(5)2(4,6)7/h1H Key: YMRMDGSNYHCUCL-UHFFFAOYSA-N
- SMILES: C(C(F)(F)Cl)(F)Cl

Properties
Chemical formula	C_{2}HCl_{2}F_{3}
Molar mass	152.93 g·mol^{−1}
Density	1.50
Melting point	−78.0 °C (−108.4 °F; 195.2 K)
Boiling point	29.5 °C (85.1 °F; 302.6 K)
Vapor pressure	620.01 mmHg
Henry's law constant (k_{H})	9.55×10^{−2} atm-cu m/mole
Refractive index (n_{D})	1.327
- Except where otherwise noted, data are given for materials in their standard state (at 25 °C [77 °F], 100 kPa). Infobox references

1,2-Dichloro-1,1,2-trifluoroethane is a volatile liquid chlorofluoroalkane composed of carbon, hydrogen, chlorine and fluorine, and with structural formula CClF_{2}CHClF. It is also known as a refrigerant with the designation R-123a.

== Formation ==
1,1,2-Trichloro-1,2,2-trifluoroethane can be biotransformed in sewage sludge to 1,2-dichloro-1,1,2-trifluoroethane.

It can be made from the reaction of tetrachloroethylene with hydrogen fluoride as a byproduct of HCFC-123 synthesis.

== Properties ==
The critical temperature of R-123a is 461.6 K (188.5 °C; 371.2 °F). The rotation of the molecule appears to be hindered by the present of chlorine on each carbon atom, but is eased at higher temperatures.

== Use ==
Although not deliberately used, R-123a is a significant impurity in its isomer, the widely used 2,2-dichloro-1,1,1-trifluoroethane (R-123).
