= Hydrocarbon pneumonitis =

Inflammation of the lungs caused by oils and fuels

Hydrocarbon pneumonitis is a kind of chemical pneumonitis. Pneumatocele is a complication of hydrocarbon pneumonitis.

== See also ==
- Fire-eater's lung
