= Pentafluoroethane =

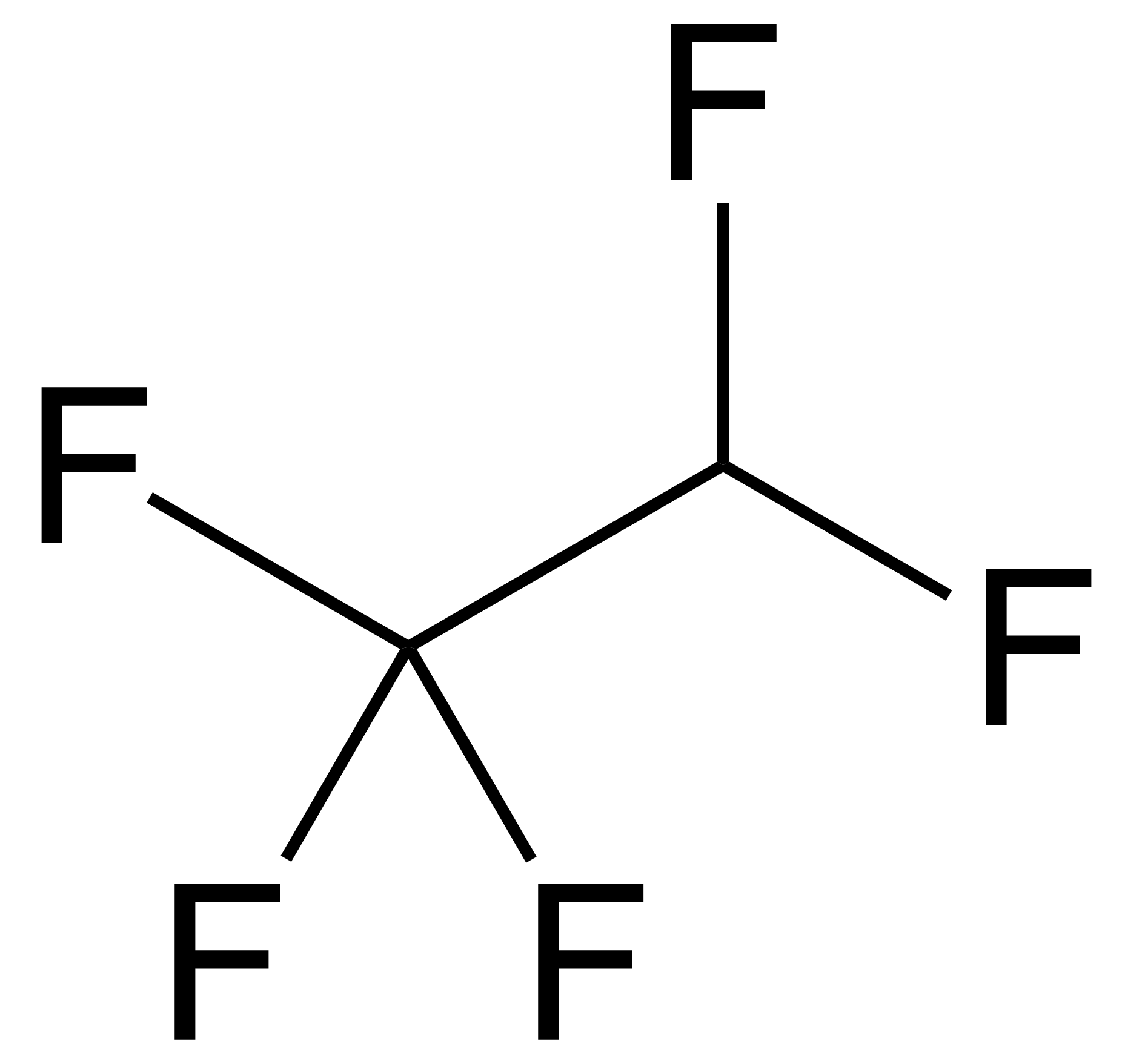

Names
- Preferred IUPAC name Pentafluoroethane
- Other names Pentafluoroethane, Genetron HFC 125, Khladon 125, Suva 125, Freon 125, Fc-125, R-125

Identifiers
CAS Number	354-33-6
3D model (JSmol)	Interactive image
ChemSpider	9256
ECHA InfoCard	100.005.962
EC Number	206-557-8
PubChem CID	9633
UNII	6TQ8593LRQ
CompTox Dashboard (EPA)	DTXSID1024251
- InChI: InChI=1S/C2HF5/c3-1(4)2(5,6)7/h1H Key: GTLACDSXYULKMZ-UHFFFAOYSA-N; InChI=1/C2HF5/c3-1(4)2(5,6)7/h1H Key: GTLACDSXYULKMZ-UHFFFAOYAX
- SMILES: FC(F)C(F)(F)F

Properties
Chemical formula	C_{2}HF_{5}
Molar mass	120.022 g·mol^{−1}
Appearance	Colourless gas. Has a faint, almost imperceptible odor
Density	1.53 g/cm^{3} (liquid at −48.5 °C)
Melting point	−103.0 °C (−153.4 °F; 170.2 K)
Boiling point	−48.5 °C (−55.3 °F; 224.7 K)
Vapor pressure	1414.05 kPa (at 25 °C)
- Except where otherwise noted, data are given for materials in their standard state (at 25 °C [77 °F], 100 kPa). verify (what is ?) Infobox references

Pentafluoroethane is a hydrofluorocarbon with the formula CF_{3}CHF_{2}. Pentafluoroethane is currently used as a refrigerant (known as R-125) and also used as a fire suppression agent in fire suppression systems.

Pentafluoroethane does not deplete ozone so it has replaced earlier fluorinated chemicals that did. However while it has zero ozone depletion potential, it has high global warming potential, reported by the United States Environmental Protection Agency (EPA), and others as 3450 times that of carbon dioxide.

== Refrigerant ==
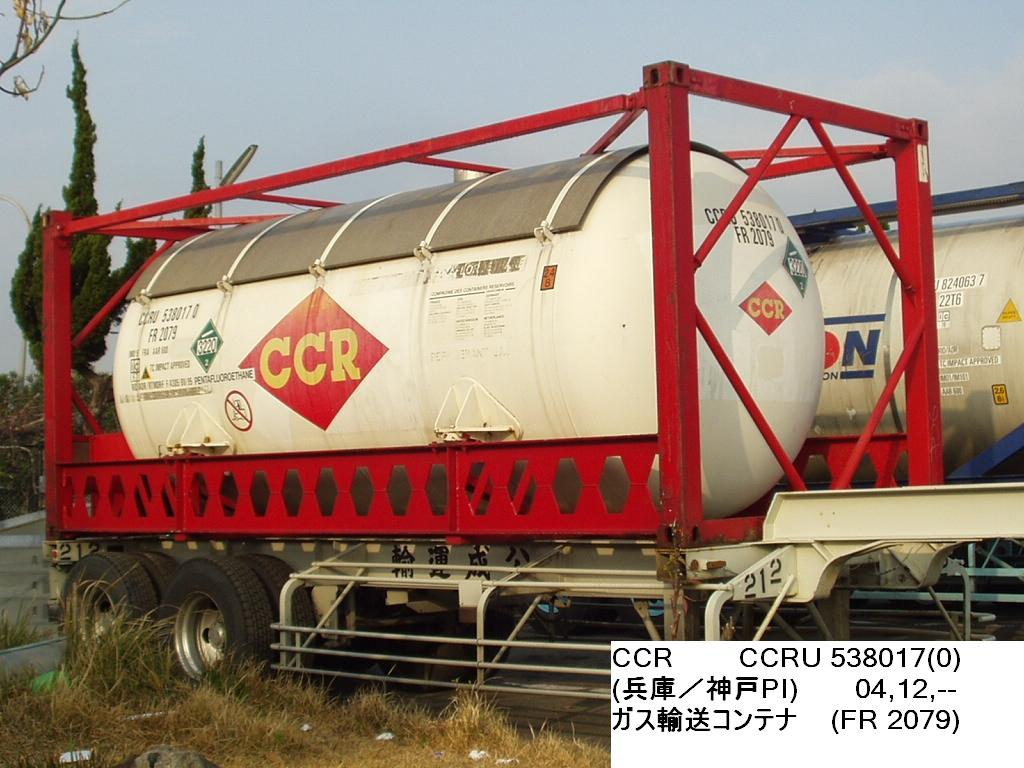
Shipping container for the gas, shown in Japan

Pentafluoroethane in a near azeotropic mixture with difluoromethane is known as R-410A, a common replacement for various chlorofluorocarbons (commonly known as Freon) in new refrigerant systems.

== Fire suppression systems ==
HFC-125 (ECARO-25 / FE-25 / NAF S 125) is a gaseous fire suppression agent which can be used in clean agent fire suppression systems. In addition, HFC-125 leaves no residue on valuable equipment and material after discharge. It is generally used in situations where water from a fire sprinkler would damage expensive equipment, or where water-based fire protection is impractical, such as museums, banks, clean rooms and hospitals. The HFC-125 clean agent is stored in a pressurized container and introduced into the hazard as a gas. The agent is odorless, colorless, electrically non-conductive, non-corrosive, and leaves no residue. It is used in occupied enclosed areas that contain high-value assets.

HFC-125 suppresses fire by absorbing heat energy at its molecular level faster than the heat can be generated, so the fire cannot sustain itself. It also forms free radicals to chemically interfere with the chain reaction of the combustion process. This makes it a highly effective fire fighting agent that is safe for people and causes no damage to equipment.

HFC-125 is considered a Clean Agent and is therefore included in the National Fire Protection Association's 2001 - Standard for Clean Agent Fire Extinguishing Systems.

== Environmental impact ==
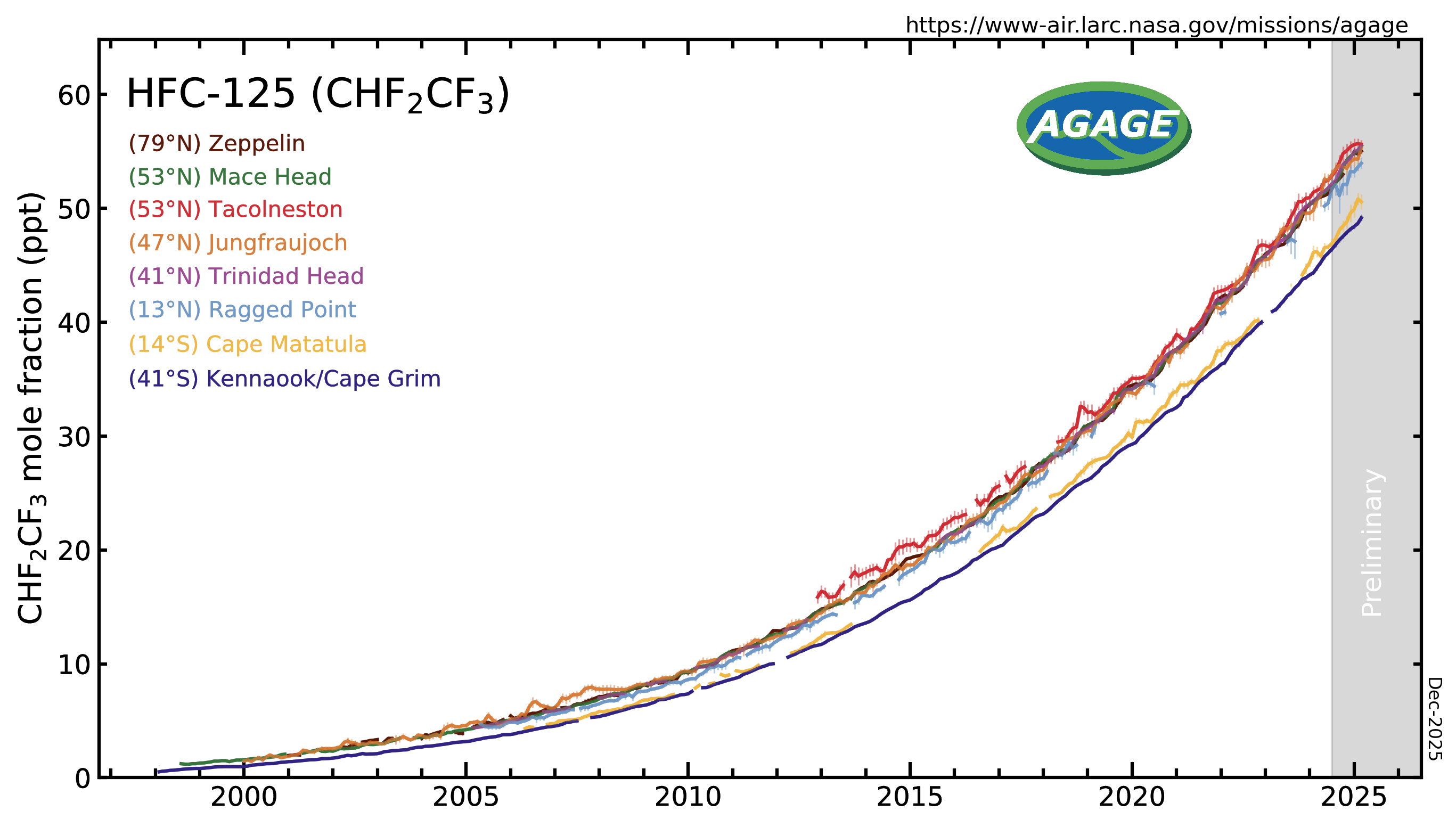
HFC-125 measured by the Advanced Global Atmospheric Gases Experiment (AGAGE) in the lower atmosphere (troposphere) at stations around the world. Abundances are given as pollution free monthly mean mole fractions in parts-per-trillion.

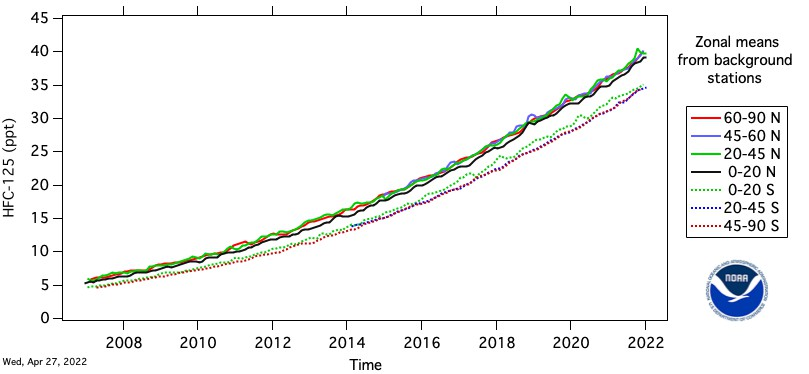
Atmospheric concentration of pentafluoroethane at various latitudes since year 2007.

HFC-125 is a non-ozone depleting replacement for chlorine- or bromine-containing chemicals such as Halon 1301. Due to its global warming potential (GWP) of 3500 times that of CO_{2} and atmospheric lifetime of 29 years, it is included in the list of controlled substances of the Montreal Protocol.

When introduced to the market HFC-125 was not considered safe for use in occupied spaces. The US EPA Significant New Alternative Policy (SNAP) listing reflected this. Following the introduction and acceptance of the PBPK model in the NFPA standard 2001 on Clean Agent Fire Extinguishing Systems 2004 Edition, the restriction was relaxed and now HFC-125 can be used in occupied hazards. Generally, class B (flammable liquid) hazards require concentrations that exceed the agent's no-observed-adverse-effect level (NOAEL) so extra precautions must be taken to avoid prolonged exposure to the agent.

At high temperatures, pentafluoroethane will decompose and produce hydrogen fluoride. This is observable as presence of sharp, pungent odour, which can be perceived in concentrations far below a dangerous level. Other decomposition products include carbonyl fluoride, carbon monoxide and carbon dioxide. Prior to re-entry of a room where HFC-125 system has been activated to suppress a fire, the atmosphere should be tested. An Acid Scavenging Additive added to pentafluoroethane is able to reduce the amount of hydrogen fluoride.

== Brands ==
ECARO-25 is a registered trademark of Fike Corporation. FE-25 is a registered trademark of E. I. du Pont de Nemours and Company or its affiliates. NAF S 125 (HFC-125 plus Acid Scavenging Additive) is a trademark of Safety Hi-Tech.
