= R-410A =

Refrigerant fluid

R-410A is a refrigerant fluid used in air conditioning and heat pump applications. It is a zeotropic but near-azeotropic mixture of difluoromethane (CH_{2}F_{2}, called R-32) and pentafluoroethane (CHF_{2}CF_{3}, called R-125). R-410A is sold under the trademarked names AZ-20, EcoFluor R410, Forane 410A, Genetron R410A, Puron, and Suva 410A. Due to its high global warming potential, R-410A is being phased out in several countries.

== History ==
R-410A was invented and patented by Allied Signal (later Honeywell) in 1991. Other producers around the world have been licensed to manufacture and sell R-410A. R-410A was successfully commercialized in the air conditioning segment by a combined effort of Carrier Corporation, Emerson Climate Technologies, Inc., Copeland Scroll Compressors (a division of Emerson Electric Company), and Allied Signal. Carrier Corporation was the first company to introduce an R-410A-based residential air conditioning unit into the market in 1996 and holds the trademark "Puron".

=== Transition from R-22 to R-410A ===
In accordance with terms and agreement reached in the Montreal Protocol (The Montreal Protocol on Substances That Deplete the Ozone Layer), the United States Environmental Protection Agency mandated that production or import of R-22 along with other hydrochlorofluorocarbons (HCFCs) be phased out in the United States. In the EU and the US, R-22 could not be used in the manufacture of new air conditioning or similar units after 1 January 2010. In other parts of the world, the phase-out date varied from country to country. Since 1 January 2020, the production and importation of R-22 has been banned in the US; the only available sources of R-22 include that which has been stockpiled or recovered from existing devices.

By 2020, most newly manufactured window air conditioners and mini split air conditioners in the United States used refrigerant R-410A. Further, R-410A had largely replaced R-22 as the preferred refrigerant for use in residential and commercial air conditioners in Japan and Europe, as well as the United States.

== Environmental effects ==
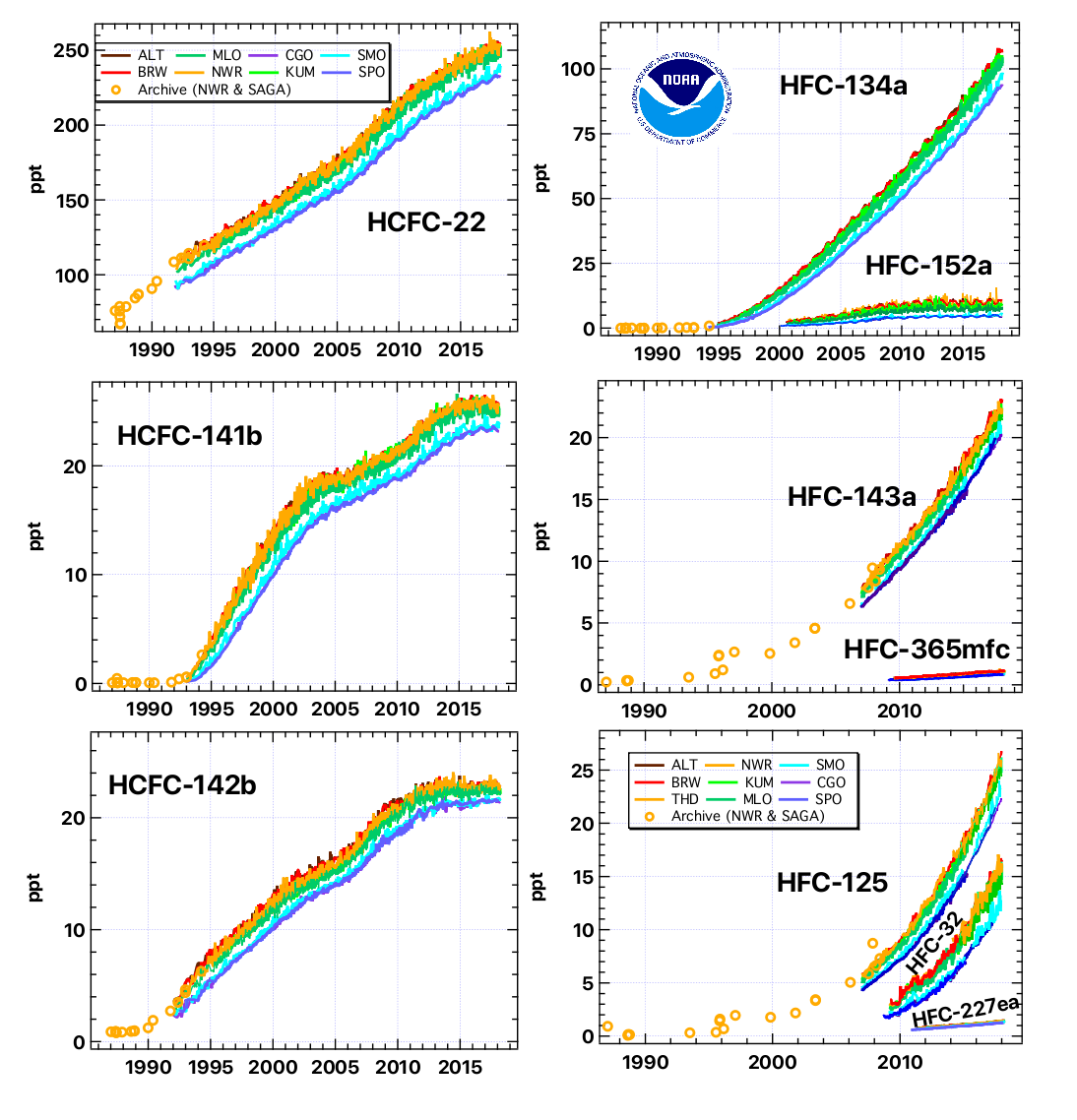
Rapid growth of R-410A (HFC-125/HFC-32) atmospheric concentrations, when & IF leaked (bottom-right graph).

Unlike alkyl halide refrigerants that contain bromine or chlorine, R-410A (which contains only fluorine) does not contribute to ozone depletion and therefore became more widely used as ozone-depleting refrigerants like R-22 were phased out. However, like methane, R-410A has a global warming potential (GWP) that is appreciably worse than CO_{2} (GWP = 1) for the time it persists. R-410A is a mixture of 50% HFC-32 and 50% HFC-125. HFC-32 has a 4.9 year lifetime and a 100-year GWP of 675 and HFC-125 has a 29-year lifetime and a 100-year GWP of 3500. The combination has an effective GWP of 2088, higher than that of R-22 (100-year GWP = 1810), and an atmospheric lifetime of nearly 30 years compared with the 12-year lifetime of R-22.

Since R-410A allows for higher SEER ratings than an R-22 system by reducing power consumption, the overall impact on global warming of R-410A systems can, in some cases, be lower than that of R-22 systems due to reduced greenhouse gas emissions from power plants. This assumes that the atmospheric leakage will be sufficiently managed. Under the assumption that preventing ozone depletion is more important in the short term than GWP reduction, R-410A is preferable to R-22.

== R-410A phaseout ==
Various countries started phase-out activities for hydrofluorocarbon refrigerants, including R-410A, due to their high global warming potential.

=== United States ===
On December 27, 2020, the United States Congress passed the American Innovation and Manufacturing (AIM) Act, which directs US Environmental Protection Agency (EPA) to phase down production and consumption of hydrofluorocarbons (HFCs). The AIM act was passed in compliance with the Kigali Amendment because HFCs have high global warming potential. Rules developed under the AIM Act require HFC production and consumption to be reduced by 85% from 2022 to 2036. R-410A will be restricted by this Act because it contains the HFC R-125. Other refrigerants with lower global warming potential will replace R-410A in most applications, just as R-410A replaced the earlier ozone-depleting refrigerant, R-22.

The phase-down mandated by the AIM Act will lead to R-410A's replacement by other refrigerants beginning in 2022. Alternative refrigerants are available, including hydrofluoroolefins, R-454B (a zeotropic blend of R-32 and R-1234yf), hydrocarbons (such as propane R-290 and isobutane R-600A), and even carbon dioxide (R-744, GWP = 1). The alternative refrigerants have much lower global warming potential than R-410A. Some alternatives have mild or moderate flammability, operate in higher pressure ranges, or require specialized compressor lubricants and seals.

=== European Union ===
In order to reduce greenhouse gas emissions, the European Union passed a law aiming at phasing out several high-GWP hydrofluorocarbon refrigerants, including R-32. Since R-32 is a constituent to R-410A, the phase-out affects R410A as well. Sale of R-410A-based domestic refrigerators are banned from 1 January 2026, and air conditioners and heat pumps from 2027 to 2030, depending on capacity and equipment type.

== Physical properties ==
R-410A is an A1 class non-flammable substance according to ISO 817 & ASHRAE 34. One of its components, R-32, is mildly flammable (A2L), and the other, R-125, is an A1 class substance that suppresses the flammability of R32.

Physical properties of R-410A refrigerant
| Property | Value |
|---|---|
| Formula | CH_{2}F_{2} (difluoromethane) / (50%); CHF_{2}CF_{3} (pentafluoroethane) / (50%) |
| Molecular weight (Da) | 72.6 |
| Melting point (°C) | −155 |
| Boiling point (°C) | −48.5 |
| Liquid density (30 °C), kg/m^{3} | 1040 |
| Vapour density (30 °C), air=1.0 | 3.0 |
| Vapour pressure at 21.1 °C (MPa) | 1.383 |
| Critical temperature (°C) | 72.8 |
| Critical pressure, MPa | 4.90 |
| Gas heat capacity (kJ/(kg·°C)) | 0.84 |
| Liquid heat capacity @ 1 atm, 30 °C, (kJ/(kg·°C)) | 1.8 |
| Flash point | should not be mixed with air or oxygen under pressure |
| Autoignition temperature | 648 °C |

Thermophysical properties - Properties of refrigerant R-410A

== Precautions ==
R-410A cannot be used in R-22 service equipment because of higher operating pressures (approximately 40 to 70% higher). Parts designed specifically for R-410A must be used. R-410A systems thus require service personnel to use different tools, equipment, safety standards, and techniques to manage the higher pressure. Equipment manufacturers were aware of these differences and required the certification of professionals installing R-410A systems. In addition, the AC&R Safety Coalition was created to help educate professionals about R-410A systems.

R-410A cylinders were colored rose, before 2017; but since 2020 AHRI guidelines discourage color-coded cylinders and recommend using light gray green for all refrigerants.

While R-410A has negligible fractionation potential, it cannot be ignored when charging.

== Trade names ==
- Suva 410A (DuPont)
- Puron (Carrier)
- Genetron AZ-20 (Honeywell)

== See also ==
- Hydrofluoroolefin
- R-32
- R-454B
- List of refrigerants
