= 2,2-Dichloro-1,1,1-trifluoroethane =

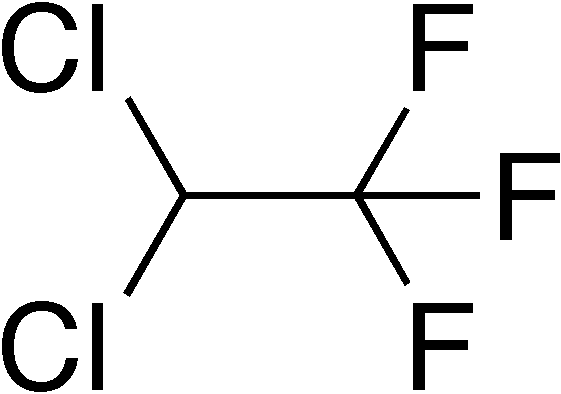

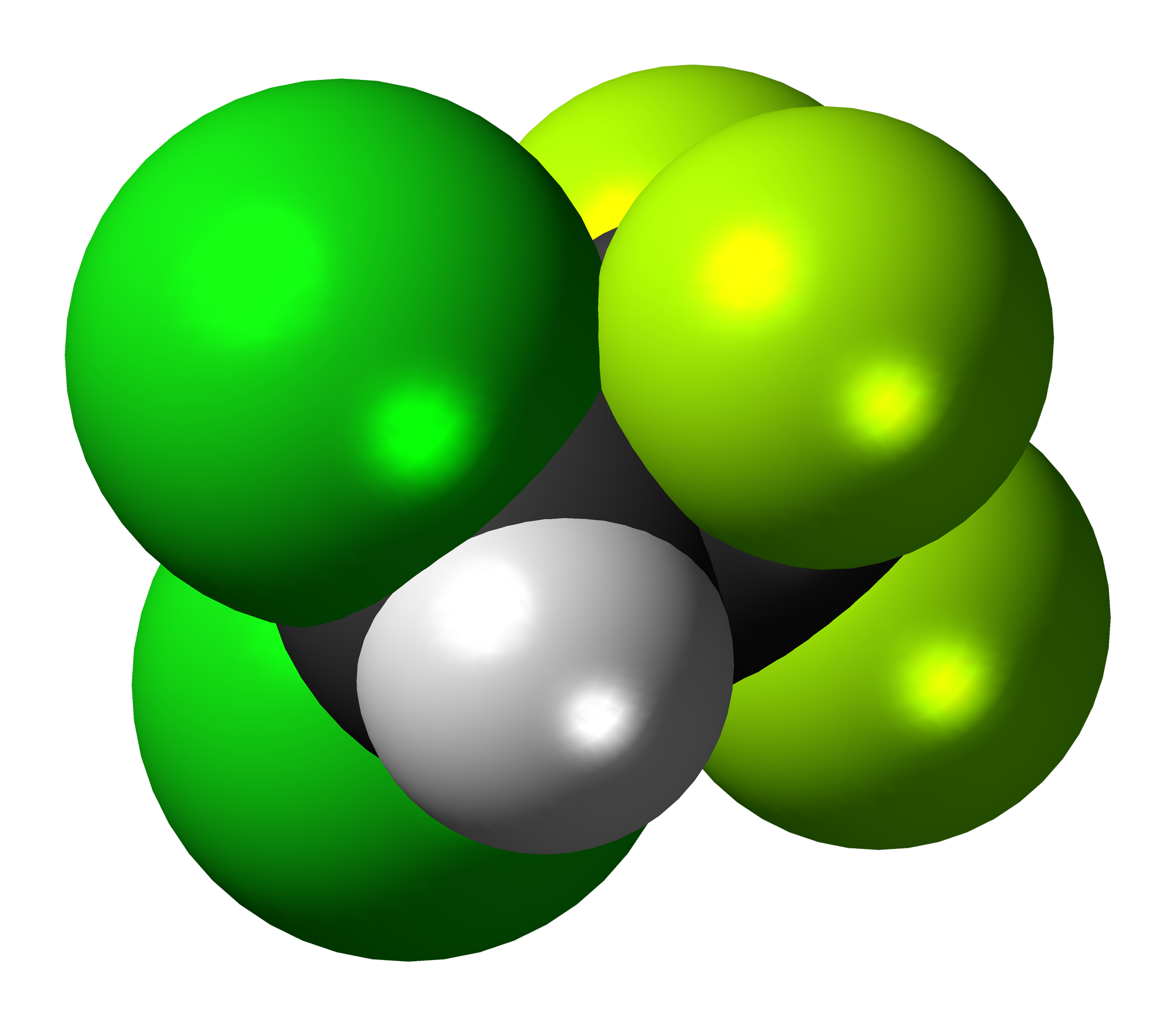

Names
- Preferred IUPAC name 2,2-Dichloro-1,1,1-trifluoroethane
- Other names 1,1,1-Trifluoro-2,2-dichloroethane, Dichlorotrifluoromethylmethane, Dichlorotrifluoroethane, Freon 123, HCFC-123, R-123

Identifiers
CAS Number	306-83-2
3D model (JSmol)	Interactive image
ChemSpider	9016
ECHA InfoCard	100.005.629
EC Number	206-190-3
PubChem CID	9385
RTECS number	KI1108000
UNII	6S7C791U3V
CompTox Dashboard (EPA)	DTXSID7020712
- InChI: InChI=1S/C2HCl2F3/c3-1(4)2(5,6)7/h1H Key: OHMHBGPWCHTMQE-UHFFFAOYSA-N; InChI=1/C2HCl2F3/c3-1(4)2(5,6)7/h1H Key: OHMHBGPWCHTMQE-UHFFFAOYAP
- SMILES: ClC(Cl)C(F)(F)F

Properties
Chemical formula	C_{2}HCl_{2}F_{3}
Molar mass	152.93 g·mol^{−1}
Appearance	Colorless liquid
Density	1.4638 g/cm^{3}
Melting point	−107 °C (−161 °F; 166 K)
Boiling point	27.82 °C (82.08 °F; 300.97 K)
Solubility in water	0.39%
Vapor pressure	89.3 kPa
Refractive index (n_{D})	1.3392

Hazards
NFPA 704 (fire diamond)	1 0 0
- Except where otherwise noted, data are given for materials in their standard state (at 25 °C [77 °F], 100 kPa). verify (what is ?) Infobox references

2,2-Dichloro-1,1,1-trifluoroethane or HCFC-123 is considered as an alternative to CFC-11 in low pressure refrigeration and HVAC systems, and should not be used in foam blowing processes or solvent applications. It is also the primary component of the Halotron I fire-extinguishing mixture.

Its ozone depletion potential is ODP = 0.012, and global warming potential is GWP = 76. HCFC-123 will eventually be phased out under the current schedule of the Montreal Protocol. It was discontinued in new HVAC equipment in 2020 in developed countries but will still be produced for service use of HVAC equipment until 2030. Developing countries can continue to use It in new equipment until 2030 and will be produced for use in service there until 2040.

HCFC-123 is used in large tonnage centrifugal chiller applications, and is the most efficient refrigerant currently in use in the marketplace for HVAC applications. HCFC-123 is also used as a testing agent for bypass leakage of carbon adsorbers in gas filtration systems, and as the primary chemical in Halotron I fire-extinguishing agent.

Cylinders of HCFC-123 were a light grey prior to the elimination of cylinder color identification.

Isomers are 1,2-dichloro-1,1,2-trifluoroethane (R-123a) with CAS 354-23-4 and 1,1-dichloro-1,2,2-trifluoroethane (R-123b) with CAS 812-04-4.

== Production ==
2,2-Dichloro-1,1,1-trifluoroethane can be produced by reacting tetrachloroethylene with hydrogen fluoride in the gas phase. This is an exothermic reaction and requires a catalyst:

Cl_{2}C=CCl_{2} + 3 HF → Cl_{2}CH—CF_{3} + 2 HCl

This reaction can give 1,2-dichloro-1,1,2-trifluoroethane as a byproduct.
