= Difluoromethane =

Difluoromethane-2D-skeletal
Spacefill model of difluoromethane

Names
- Preferred IUPAC name Difluoromethane
- Other names R-32; Methylene difluoride Methylene fluoride Freon-32

Identifiers
| CAS Number | 75-10-5 |
| 3D model (JSmol) | Interactive image |
| Abbreviations | HFC-32; R-32; FC-32 |
| Beilstein Reference | 1730795 |
| ChEBI | CHEBI:47855 |
| ChEMBL | ChEMBL115186 |
| ChemSpider | 6105 |
| ECHA InfoCard | 100.000.764 |
| EC Number | 200-839-4 |
| Gmelin Reference | 259463 |
| MeSH | Difluoromethane |
| PubChem CID | 6345 |
| RTECS number | PA8537500 |
| UNII | 77JW9K722X |
| UN number | 3252 |
| CompTox Dashboard (EPA) | DTXSID6029597 |
- InChI: InChI=1S/CH2F2/c2-1-3/h1H2 Key: RWRIWBAIICGTTQ-UHFFFAOYSA-N; InChI=1/CH2F2/c2-1-3/h1H2 Key: RWRIWBAIICGTTQ-UHFFFAOYAC
- SMILES: FCF

Properties
| Chemical formula | CH_{2}F_{2} |
| Molar mass | 52.024 g·mol^{−1} |
| Appearance | Colourless gas |
| Density | 1.1 g cm^{−3}(in liquid form) |
| Melting point | −136 °C (−213 °F; 137 K) |
| Boiling point | −52 °C (−62 °F; 221 K) |
| Critical point (T, P) | 351 K (78 °C), 5.83 MPa (57.5 atm) |
| log P | −0.611 |
| Vapor pressure | 1,518.92 kPa (220.301 psi) (at 21.1 °C [70.0 °F; 294.2 K]) |

Hazards
- GHS labelling
| Pictograms | (GHS02: Flammable) |
| Signal word | Danger |
| Hazard statements | H220 |
| Precautionary statements | P210, P377, P381, P403, P410+P403 |
| NFPA 704 (fire diamond) | 1 4 0 |
| Autoignition temperature | 648 °C (1,198 °F; 921 K) |
| Safety data sheet (SDS) | MSDS at Oxford University |
- Except where otherwise noted, data are given for materials in their standard state (at 25 °C [77 °F], 100 kPa). verify (what is ?) Infobox references

Difluoromethane, also called HFC-32 or R-32, is an organofluorine compound with the formula CH_{2}F_{2}. It is a colorless gas that is used as a refrigerant. As a hydrofluorocarbon, R-32 is being phased out in the EU. Material safety data sheets describe R-32 as an "extremely flammable gas"

== Synthesis ==
Difluoromethane is produced by the reaction of dichloromethane and hydrogen fluoride (HF) using SbF_{5} as a catalyst.

CH_{2}Cl_{2} + 2 HF → CH_{2}F_{2} + 2 HCl

== Applications ==
Difluoromethane is used as refrigerant that has prominent heat transfer and pressure drop performance, both in condensation and vaporization.

Difluoromethane is currently used by itself in residential and commercial air-conditioners in Japan, China, and India as a substitute for R-410A. In order to reduce the residual risk associated with its mild flammability, this molecule should be applied in heat transfer equipment with low refrigerant charge such as brazed plate heat exchangers (BPHE), or shell and tube heat exchangers and tube and plate heat exchangers with tube of small diameter. Many applications confirmed that difluoromethane exhibits heat transfer coefficients higher than those of R-410A under the same operating conditions but also higher frictional pressure drops.

Other uses of difluoromethane include its use as aerosol propellant and blowing agent.

== Environmental effects ==
The global warming potential (GWP) of HFC-32 is estimated at 677 on a 100-year time window. This is lower than the GWP for HFC refrigerants that it is replacing, but remains sufficiently high to spur continued research into using lower-GWP refrigerants.

The ozone depletion potential of difluoromethane is zero, so it is excluded from the 1963 list of volatile organic compounds restricted by the United States Clean Air Act.

== European Union phase-out ==
In order to reduce greenhouse gas emissions, the European Union passed a law aiming at phasing out several high-GWP hydrofluorocarbon refrigerants, including R-32. Sale of R-32-based domestic refrigerators are banned from 1 January 2026, and air conditioners and heat pumps from 2027 to 2030, depending on capacity and equipment type.

Replacements being considered are:

- R-290 (propane) – highly flammable and not suitable for many residential installations. Manufacturers are also trying to restrict DIY installations of it, which increases costs.
- R-454C – a mix of 21.5 percent R-32 and 78.5 percent R1234yf. This is under the GWP limit of 150, but has a worse COP. Additionally R1234yf can decompose into the highly toxic forever chemical TFA.
- R-744 (carbon dioxide) – engineering challenges remain because the cost is too high for residential use and high pressure running is required to get room temperature operation.

== See also ==
- R-410A, a refrigerant that is being phased out, and which R-32 is a popular replacement for
- R-454B, another R-410A replacement
- List of refrigerants
