= Bromotrifluoromethane =

Organic halide used for fire suppression

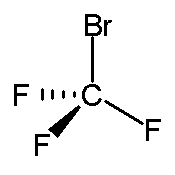

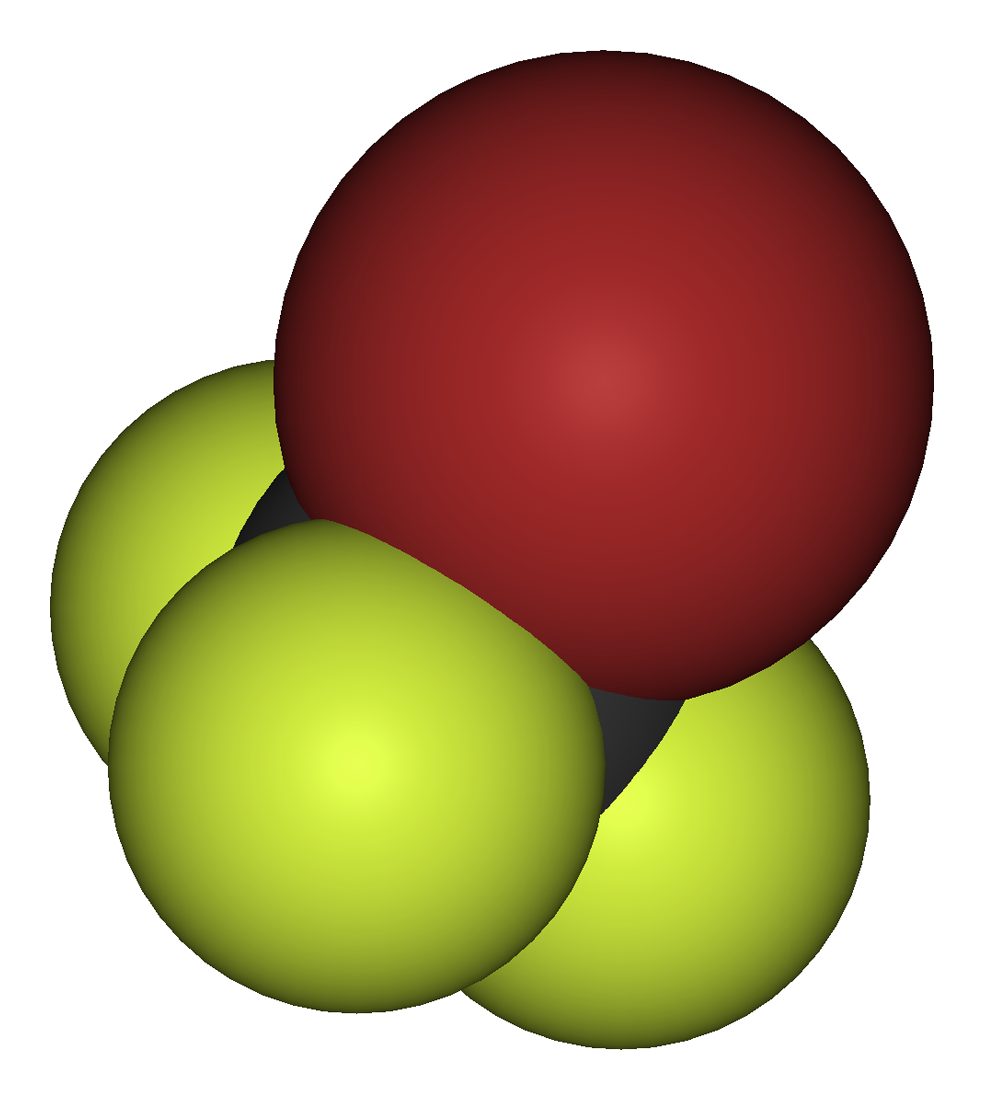

Names
- Preferred IUPAC name Bromotri(fluoro)methane
- Other names: Bromotrifluoromethane; Trifluorobromomethane; Monobromotrifluoromethane; Trifluoromethyl bromide; Bromofluoroform; Carbon monobromide trifluoride; Halon 1301; BTM; Freon 13BI; Freon FE 1301; R 13B1; Halon 1301 BTM

Identifiers
| CAS Number | 75-63-8 |
| 3D model (JSmol) | Interactive image |
| ChemSpider | 6144 |
| ECHA InfoCard | 100.000.807 |
| EC Number | 200-887-6 |
| PubChem CID | 6384 |
| RTECS number | PA5425000 |
| UNII | 52231LCA7R |
| UN number | 1009 |
| CompTox Dashboard (EPA) | DTXSID5026415 |
- InChI: InChI=1S/CBrF3/c2-1(3,4)5 Key: RJCQBQGAPKAMLL-UHFFFAOYSA-N; InChI=1/CBrF3/c2-1(3,4)5 Key: RJCQBQGAPKAMLL-UHFFFAOYAV
- SMILES: BrC(F)(F)F

Properties
| Chemical formula | CBrF_{3} |
| Molar mass | 148.910 g·mol^{−1} |
| Appearance | Colorless gas |
| Odor | Odorless |
| Density | 1.538 g/cm^{3} (at −58 °C (−72 °F)) |
| Melting point | −167.78 °C (−270.00 °F; 105.37 K) |
| Boiling point | −57.75 °C (−71.95 °F; 215.40 K) |
| Solubility in water | 0.03 g/L (20 °C (68 °F)) |
| log P | 1.86 |
| Vapor pressure | 1434 kPa (20 °C (68 °F)) |

Hazards
| Flash point | Non-flammable |
- Lethal dose or concentration (LD, LC)
| LC_{Lo} (lowest published) | 834,000 ppm (rat, 15 min) |
- NIOSH (US health exposure limits)
| PEL (Permissible) | TWA 1000 ppm (6100 mg/m^{3}) |
| REL (Recommended) | TWA 1000 ppm (6100 mg/m^{3}) |
| IDLH (Immediate danger) | 40,000 ppm |
- Except where otherwise noted, data are given for materials in their standard state (at 25 °C [77 °F], 100 kPa). verify (what is ?) Infobox references

Bromotrifluoromethane, commonly referred to by the code numbers Halon 1301, R13B1, Halon 13B1 or BTM, is an organic halide with the chemical formula CBrF_{3}. It is used for gaseous fire suppression as a far less toxic alternative to bromochloromethane.

== Table of physical properties ==
| Property | Value |
|---|---|
| Critical temperature (T_{c}) | 66.9 °C (340.08 K) |
| Critical pressure (p_{c}) | 3.956 MPa (39.56 bar) |
| Critical density (ρ_{c}) | 5.13 mol.l^{−1} |
| Ozone depletion potential (ODP) | 10 (CCl_{3}F = 1) |
| Global warming potential (GWP) | 6900 (CO_{2} = 1) |

== Synthesis ==
Bromotrifluoromethane is commercially synthesized in a two-step process from chloroform. Chloroform is fluorinated with hydrogen fluoride.

CHCl_{3} + 3 HF → CHF_{3} + 3 HCl

The resulting fluoroform is then reacted with elemental bromine.

CHF_{3} + Br_{2} → CF_{3}Br + HBr

== Uses ==
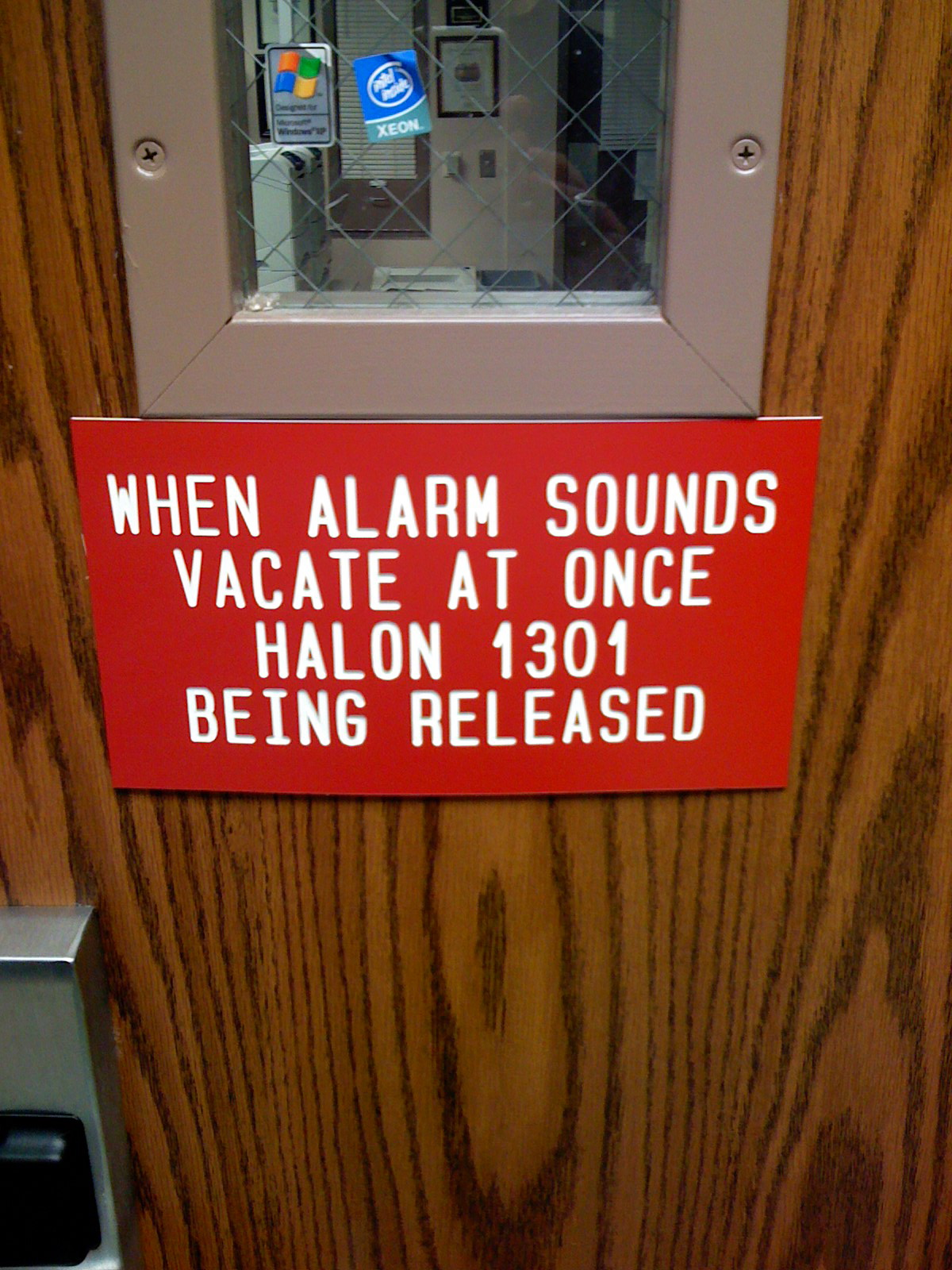
Warning sign for fire suppression system

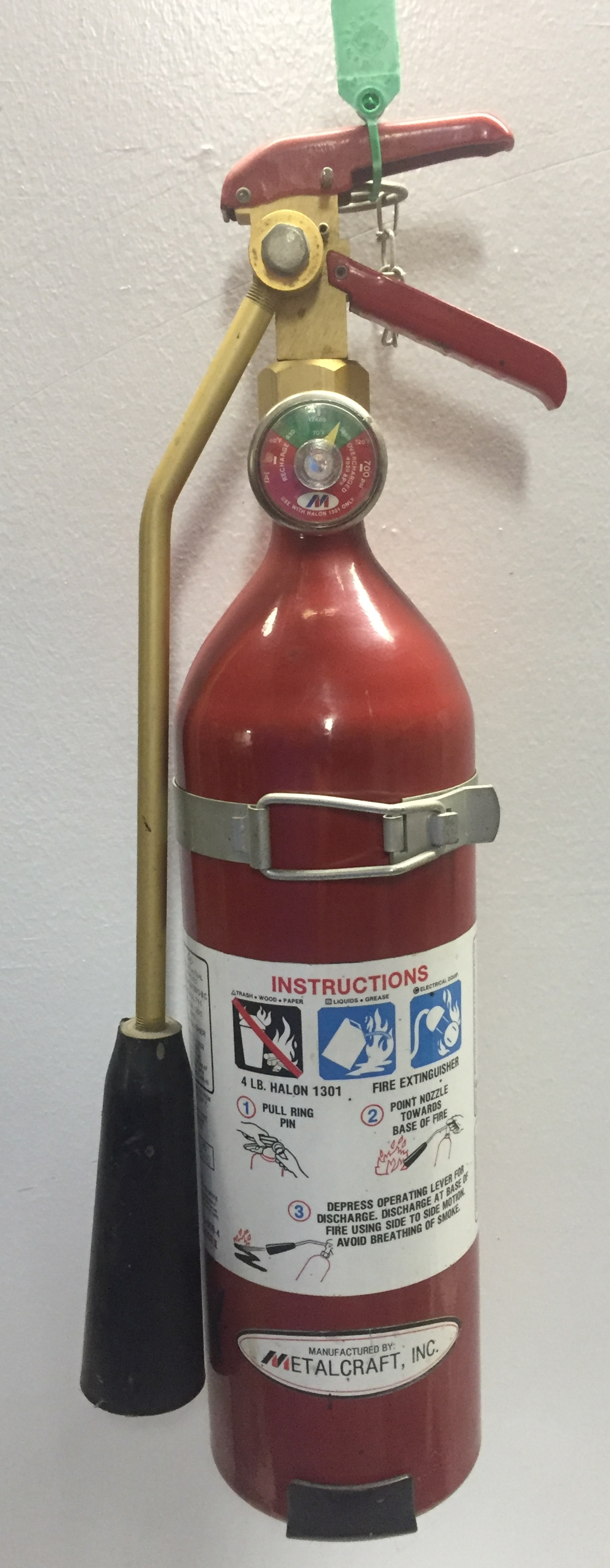
Civilian Halon 1301 fire extinguisher, USA, 1980s

Halon 1301 was developed in a joint venture between the U.S. Army and Purdue University in the late 1940's, and became a DuPont product in 1954. It was introduced as an effective gaseous fire suppression fixed systems agent in the 1960s, and was used around valuable materials, such as aircraft, mainframe computers, and telecommunication switching centers, usually in total flooding systems. It was also widely used in the maritime industry to add a third level of protection should the main and emergency fire pumps become inoperable or ineffective. Halon 1301 was never widely used in portables outside marine, military and spacecraft applications, due to its limited range, and invisible discharge. It does not produce the characteristic white cloud like CO_{2} and is difficult to direct when fighting large fires. Halon 1301 is ideal for armored vehicles and spacecraft, because it produces fewer toxic by-products than does Halon 1211, which is critical for combat or space conditions where a compartment may not be able to be ventilated immediately. Halon 1301 is widely used by the U.S. Military and NASA in a 2-3/4 lb portable extinguisher with a sealed, disposable cylinder for quick recharging. Other agents such as CO_{2} and FE-36 (HFC-236fa) wet chemical are largely replacing halon 1301 for environmental concerns. Civilian models in 2-3/4, 3, and 4 lb sizes were also made.

It is considered good practice to avoid all unnecessary exposure to Halon 1301, and to limit exposures to concentrations of 7% and below to 15 minutes. Exposure to Halon 1301 in the 5% to 7% range produces little, if any, noticeable effect. At levels between 7% and 10%, mild central nervous system effects such as dizziness and tingling in the extremities have been reported. The M2 Bradley operator's manual advised soldiers to open up the hatches and turn on the vent fans or to leave the vehicle within five minutes after the Halon fire suppression system was activated, while the M1 Abrams vent fans automatically activated upon detecting a Halon 1301 discharge.

Halon systems are among the most effective and commonly used fire protection systems used on commercial aircraft. Halon 1301 is the primary agent used in commercial aviation engine, cargo compartments, and auxiliary power unit fire zones. Efforts to find a suitable replacement for Halon 1301 have not produced a widely accepted replacement.

Bromotrifluoromethane was also used as a filling of the bubble chamber in the neutrino detector Gargamelle.

Before the dangers of Halon 1301 as an ozone depleter were known, many industrial chillers used it as an efficient refrigerant gas.

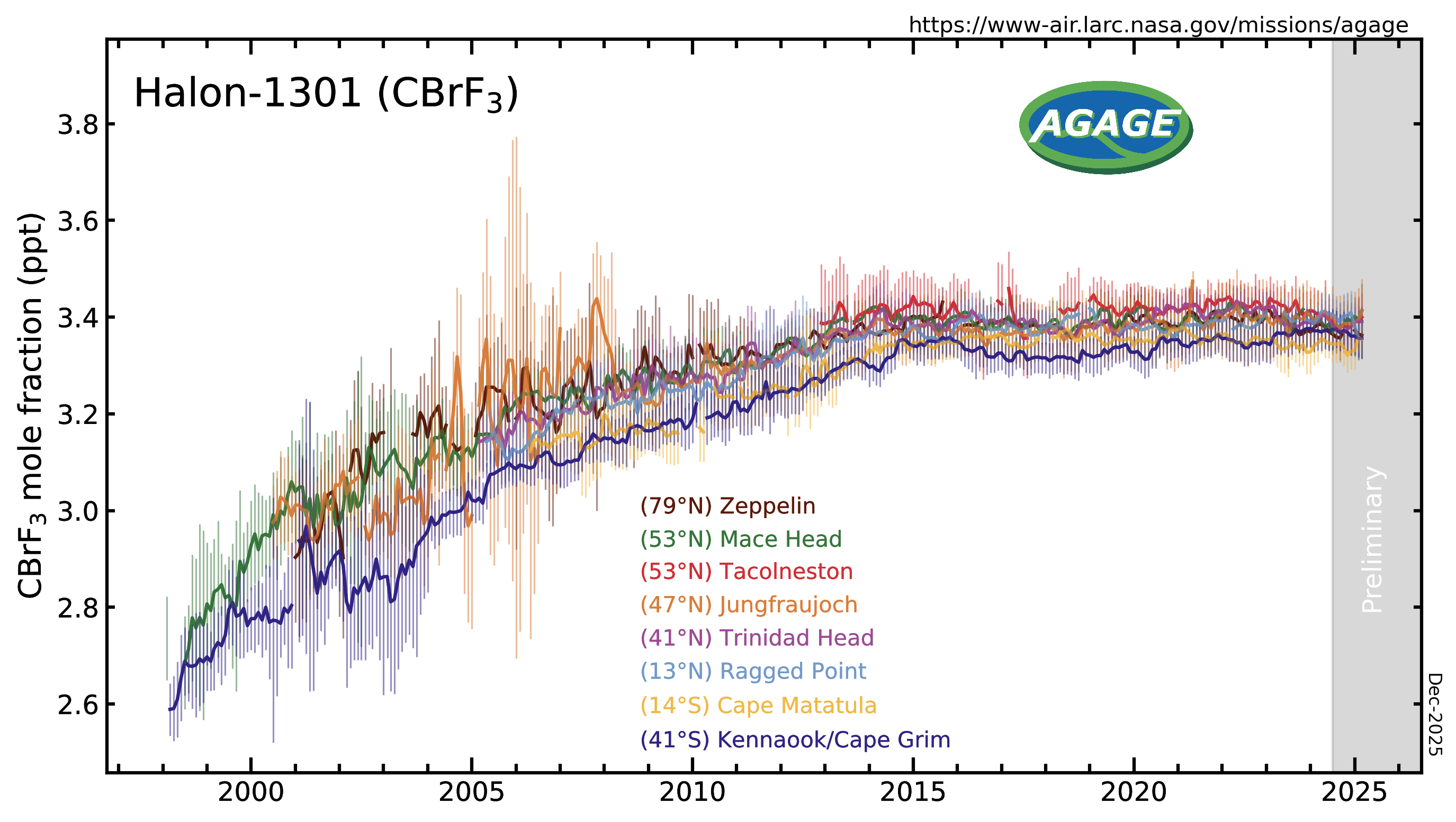
H-1301 measured by the Advanced Global Atmospheric Gases Experiment (AGAGE) in the lower atmosphere (troposphere) at stations around the world. Abundances are given as pollution free monthly mean mole fractions in parts-per-trillion.

=== Chemical reagent ===
It is a precursor to trifluoromethyltrimethylsilane, a popular trifluoromethylating reagent in organic synthesis.

== Alternatives ==
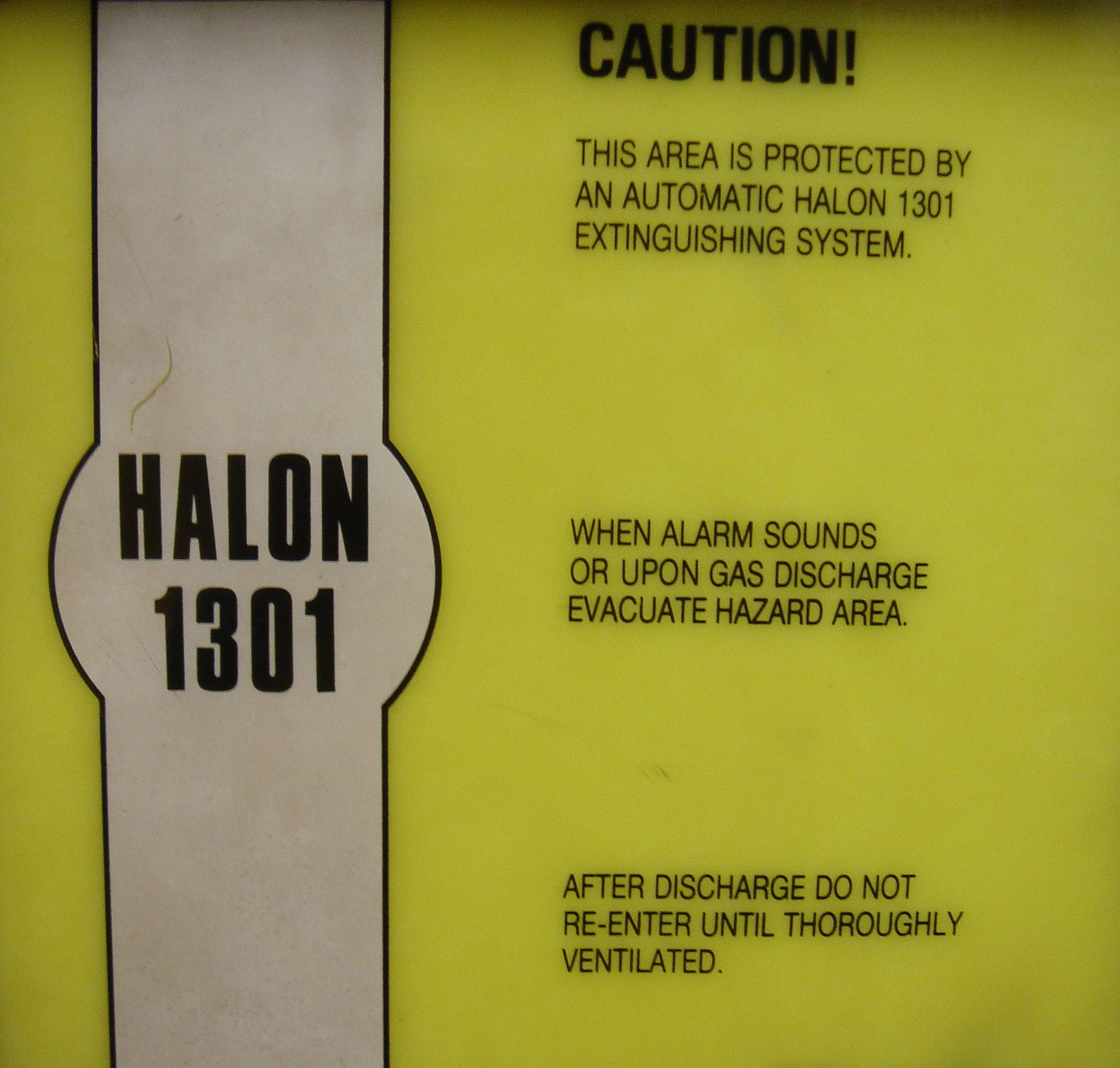
Halon 1301 hazard sign, with instructions upon gas discharge.

Alternatives for normally occupied areas include (PFC-410 or CEA-410), C_{3}F_{8} (PFC-218 or CEA-308), HCFC Blend A (NAF S-III), HFC-23 (FE 13), HFC-227ea (FM 200), IG-01 (argon), IG-55 (argonite), HFC-125, or HFC-134a. For normally unoccupied areas, the alternatives include carbon dioxide, powdered Aerosol C, CF_{3}I, HCFC-22, HCFC-124, HFC-125, HFC-134a, gelled halocarbon/dry chemical suspension (PGA), blend of inert gas, high expansion foam systems and powdered aerosol (FS 0140), and IG-541 (Inergen). Perfluorocarbons, i.e., PFCs such as C_{3}F_{8}, have very long atmospheric lifetimes and very high global warming potentials. Hydrochlorofluorocarbons, i.e., HCFCs including HCFC containing NAF S-III, contain chlorine and are stratospheric ozone layer depleters, although less so than Halon 1301. Their selection for usage as Halon replacements should consider those factors, and is restricted in some countries.

== See also ==
- Halon 1211
- Fire extinguisher
- Montreal Protocol
