= R-407A =

R-407A is a mixture of gasses used as a refrigerant. It is a zeotropic blend of difluoromethane (HFC-32), pentafluoroethane (HFC-125) and 1,1,1,2-tetrafluoroethane (HFC-134a). R-407A was developed as a close match to R-22's capacities and flow rates, making it well suited as an energy efficient retrofit for R-22 in medium and low temperature refrigeration systems for supermarket and food storage applications, but not for air conditioning systems or those with flooded evaporators. It must be used with synthetic oils. Its global warming potential is 2107.
