= R-407C =

Mixture used as a refrigerant

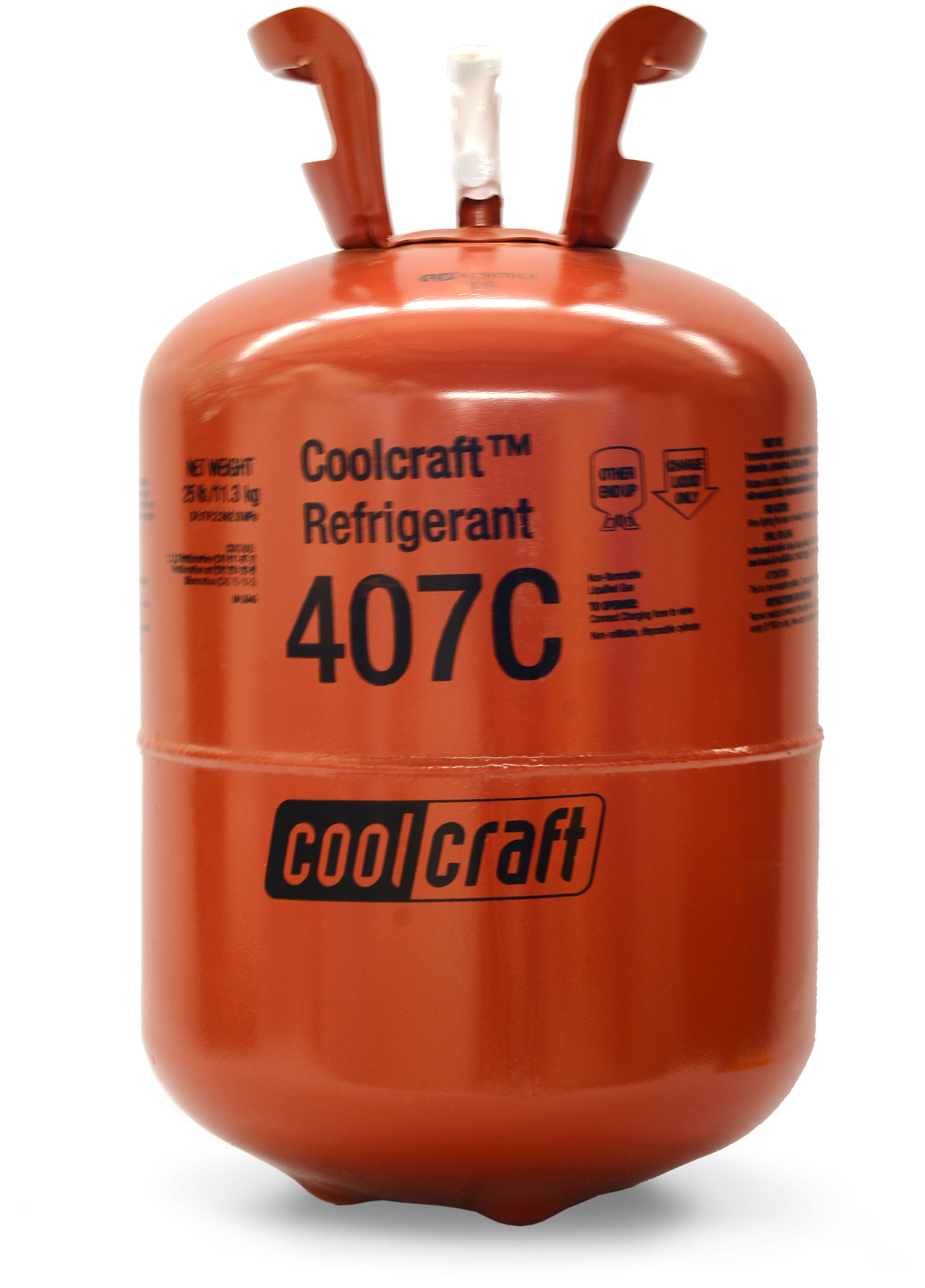
R-407C container

R-407C is a mixture of hydrofluorocarbons used as a refrigerant. It is a zeotropic blend of difluoromethane (R-32), pentafluoroethane (R-125), and 1,1,1,2-tetrafluoroethane (R-134a). Difluoromethane provides heat capacity, pentafluoroethane decreases flammability, and tetrafluoroethane reduces pressure. R-407C has a glide of approximately 5 °C compared with R-410a which has less than 0.17K. R-407C cylinders are colored burnt orange.

R-407C is intended as a replacement for R-22 in existing refrigerators. R-22 production will be phased out by 2020 as per the Montreal Protocol, as the chlorine in R-22 can lead to ozone depletion. As the components in R-407C lack chlorine, it does not contribute significantly to ozone depletion in the stratosphere. Despite having a lower environmental impact with respect to ozone depletion, R-407C still has a calculated 100-year global warming potential of 1774, only slightly lower than calculated value of 1960 of R-22 it replaces. The use of R-407C and other high global warming potential (GWP) hydrofluorocarbon refrigerants is being phased out worldwide in accordance with the Kigali Amendment to the Montreal Protocol. Its use was barred for many applications in the United States on 1 January 2025 with near-complete phaseout planned by 1 January 2028.

== Physical properties ==
Physical properties of R407C refrigerant
Property	Value
Formula	CH_{2}F_{2} / R32 (23%); CF_{3}CHF_{2} / R125 (25%); CF_{3}CH_{2}F / R134a (52%)
Boiling point (°C)	−43.8
Saturated liquid density (25 °C), kg/m^{3}	1138
Saturated vapour density (25 °C), kg/m^{3}	43.8
Critical temperature (°C)	86.4
Critical pressure, bar	46.3
Liquid heat capacity @ 25 °C, (kJ/(kg·K))	1.533
Vapour heat capacity @ 1.013 bar (kJ/(kg·K))	1.107
