= Barbara Haviland Minor =

American chemical engineer

- Education: Bucknell University
- Awards: Dupont Fellow, Perkin Medal
- Scientific career
- Workplaces: DuPont, Chemours

External videos
- "CCN Video: HFOs in Australia", Interview with Barbara Minor, 2015

Barbara Haviland Minor is an American chemical engineer, known for the development of refrigerants. She was technical leader for chemical company DuPont in the development of R-1234yf, a refrigerant which, as of 2018, was used in 50% of all new vehicles produced by original equipment manufacturers, and which represented an important contribution to countering global warming.

Minor was one of five women to be named a Dupont Fellow in 2014, the first year that the company named women to its highest technical level. In 2018, she was awarded the Society of Chemical Industry's Perkin Medal, given annually for 'innovation in applied chemistry resulting in outstanding commercial development'.

== Life ==
Minor graduated from Bucknell University in 1981 with a Bachelor of Science in chemical engineering.

== Career ==
Minor worked at DuPont from 1981 to 2015, when she moved to the spinoff company Chemours in Wilmington, Delaware. Minor develops new refrigerants for air conditioning and refrigeration systems. Her work supports the phasing out of ozone depleting chlorofluorocarbons and hydrochlorofluorocarbons, and of hydrofluorocarbons that contribute to global warming.

Minor was the technical leader for the research group at DuPont that developed HFO-1234yf, a hydrofluoroolefin that can reduce emissions from automotive air conditioning by more than 99%. HFO-1234yf has a much lower global warming potential (GWP) than the previously used R-134a: its 100-year GWP was originally calculated as 4, and later recalculated as <1, compared to 1430 for R-134a. HFO-1234yf also has a lower atmospheric lifetime (11 days compared to 14 years), and higher energy efficiency under many conditions.

The Dupont team worked jointly with researchers at Honeywell. As a replacement for R-134a, HFO-1234yf is marketed as Opteon yf by Dupont (later Chemours), and as Solstice yf by Honeywell. As of 2018, 50% of new vehicles produced by original equipment manufacturers (OEMs) are believed to use HFO-1234yf for air conditioning.

Minor helped to develop both the XP (2014) and XL (2016) lines of refrigerant for Dupont and Chemours. In addition to alternative refrigerants for use in automobiles, more ecologically friendly refrigerants have been developed for supermarket refrigeration systems (XP40) commercial freezers (XL20), reach-in coolers and freezers (R450A), beverage coolers (HFO-1234yf), large building chillers (XP30), transport units with self-contained refrigeration (XP44) direct expansion air conditioning, chilled water air conditioning and heat pumps (XL41, XL55). Minor is also a co-inventor of Dupont's ISCEON MO99 (R438A), a possible replacement for R22, and Suva 95 (R508B), a possible replacement for R13 and R503. A number of these refrigerants involve HFO/HFC blends.

Minor holds more than 160 patents in the United States, for her work on refrigerants, cleaning agents, and aerosol propellants.

She is a member of the American Society of Heating, Refrigeration and Air Conditioning Engineers (ASHRAE) and the Air-Conditioning, Heating, and Refrigeration Institute (AHRI). She has chaired the AHRI's Research group and the AHRTI's Technology and Steering committees.

== Awards ==
- 2003: featured DuPont scientist, Woman Engineer magazine
- 2010: DuPont Sustainable Growth Award for HFO-1234yf
- 2014: DuPont Fellow
- 2016: Distinguished Service Award, American Society of Heating, Refrigeration and Air Conditioning Engineers (ASHRAE)
- 2017: Distinguished Engineering Alumni Award, Bucknell University College of Engineering and the Bucknell Engineering Alumni Association
- 2018: Perkin Medal
- 2023: American Chemical Society (Delaware section) Carothers Award
