= R-406A =

Type of refrigerant

R-406A is a refrigerant invented by George H. Goble. It is a mixture of three components: chlorodifluoromethane (R-22), isobutane (R-600a), and 1-chloro-1,1-difluoroethane (R-142b) in the ratio 55/4/41.

This refrigerant was designed as a drop-in replacement for dichlorodifluoromethane (R-12) which is compatible with the typical mineral oil lubricants used in R-12 systems. Since it is a zeotropic mixture, it has a range of boiling points which may increase the effectiveness of the heat transfer elements in refrigeration equipment.

Because it contains R-22, its future is limited due to eventual phase-out of this refrigerant.
