= George H. Goble =

American scientist and academic (1952–2026)

- Born: December 11, 1952
- Died: March 18, 2026 (aged 73); Lafayette, Indiana, U.S.

George Harry Goble (December 11, 1952 – March 18, 2026) was an American scientist and academic, who was a staff member at the Purdue University Engineering Computer Network and a 1996 Ig Nobel Prize winner.

== Life and career ==
Goble was commonly known as ghg, since he used that as a login id and signature in digital communications from the 1970s. He received his BS in electrical engineering at Purdue University.

In 1981, he wired together the backplanes of two DEC VAX-11/780 systems and made the first multi-CPU Unix computer, preceding DEC's dual-processor VAX-11/782. The operating system was based on the 4.1 BSD kernel, and the modifications thus eventually made it into the 4.3 BSD Unix release. At the beginning of the 4.3 BSD user manuals, Bill Joy wrote a special note of thanks to GHG for being courageous enough to put the multi-CPU kernel into a production environment before anyone else. (However, the frequent crashes for a while inspired the writing of many humorous text files by the Purdue University electrical engineering student body, such as "The VAX had a Blowout", to be sung to the tune of "London Bridge is Falling Down".) The development of the dual-CPU Unix system was the subject of Goble's master's thesis.

Around this time, Goble, along with Bill Croft, also developed a networking protocol for Unix, referred to as pnet, which was used at Purdue at the time before being displaced by TCP/IP. Pnet allowed remote logins, and remote execution of commands, among other capabilities.

In the late 1980s, Goble started experimenting with refrigerants, due to increased danger and lower thermodynamic efficiency of the recently introduced R-134a compared to the older R-12 which was being phased out due to concerns about damage to the ozone layer, and the incompatibility of R-134a with the lubricating oil and other materials used in systems built for R-12. In 1987, he converted the beverage refrigerators in the Eta Kappa Nu lounge in the basement of the Purdue Electrical Engineering building to using a refrigerant of his own devising. This refrigerant is now recognized as R-406A by ASHRAE and is available commercially under the trade name AutoFrost. He later developed another refrigerant which is compatible with R134A lubricants, but which is superior in thermodynamic efficiency and lower system internal pressures called GHG-X8.

While at Purdue University in 1994, George Goble, along with his colleague Dave Curry, decided to broadcast the Solar Eclipse over the internet, made possible by live video frames on the web.

In 1996, Goble was awarded the Ig Nobel Prize in Chemistry, for preparing a barbecue for cooking in less than 5 seconds by the use of a smoldering cigarette, charcoal and LOX (liquid oxygen). This act attracted the attention of the West Lafayette, Indiana fire department, which warned him to never let them catch him in the possession of LOX near a barbecue fire ever again.

Goble was also noted for driving a vehicle with the Indiana license plate UNIX, and also GHG-1.

Goble died in Lafayette, Indiana, on March 18, 2026, at the age of 73.

== See also ==
- List of Ig Nobel Prize winners
