= Care 30 =

CARE 30 is a refrigerant consisting of a blend of isobutane (R-600a) and propane (R-290) developed to replace dichlorodifluoromethane (R-12) and 1,1,1,2-tetrafluoroethane (R-134a). It is primarily for use in small commercial refrigeration and air-conditioning systems that have traditionally used R-12.

== Compatibility ==
It operates at similar pressures and possesses similar volumetric refrigerating effect to R-12 and R-134a. It can be used in a R12 or R134A compressor or a specific CARE 30 compressor. It can be used with R-12 or R-134a heat exchangers and expansion devices. It is compatible with most common refrigeration materials and lubricants.

== Comparison ==
Comparison with R-12 and R-134a

	CARE 30	R-12	R-134a
Chemical Type	HC	CFC	HFC
Composition	zeotrope	Pure	Pure
Application	small commercial	-	-
Temperature Range	high, medium	-	-
Ozone depletion potential (CFC-11=1)	0	0.9	0
Global warming potential (CO_{2}=1, 100yr ITH)	3	10600	1600
Normal boiling point (1.0 bar, abs)	-31 °C	-30 °C	-26 °C
Latent heat (1.0 bar, abs)	367 kJ/kg	145 kJ/kg	189 kJ/kg
Refrigerant mass charge size (R-12=100%)	41%	100%	91%
