= 2,3,3,3-Tetrafluoropropene =

Chemical compound

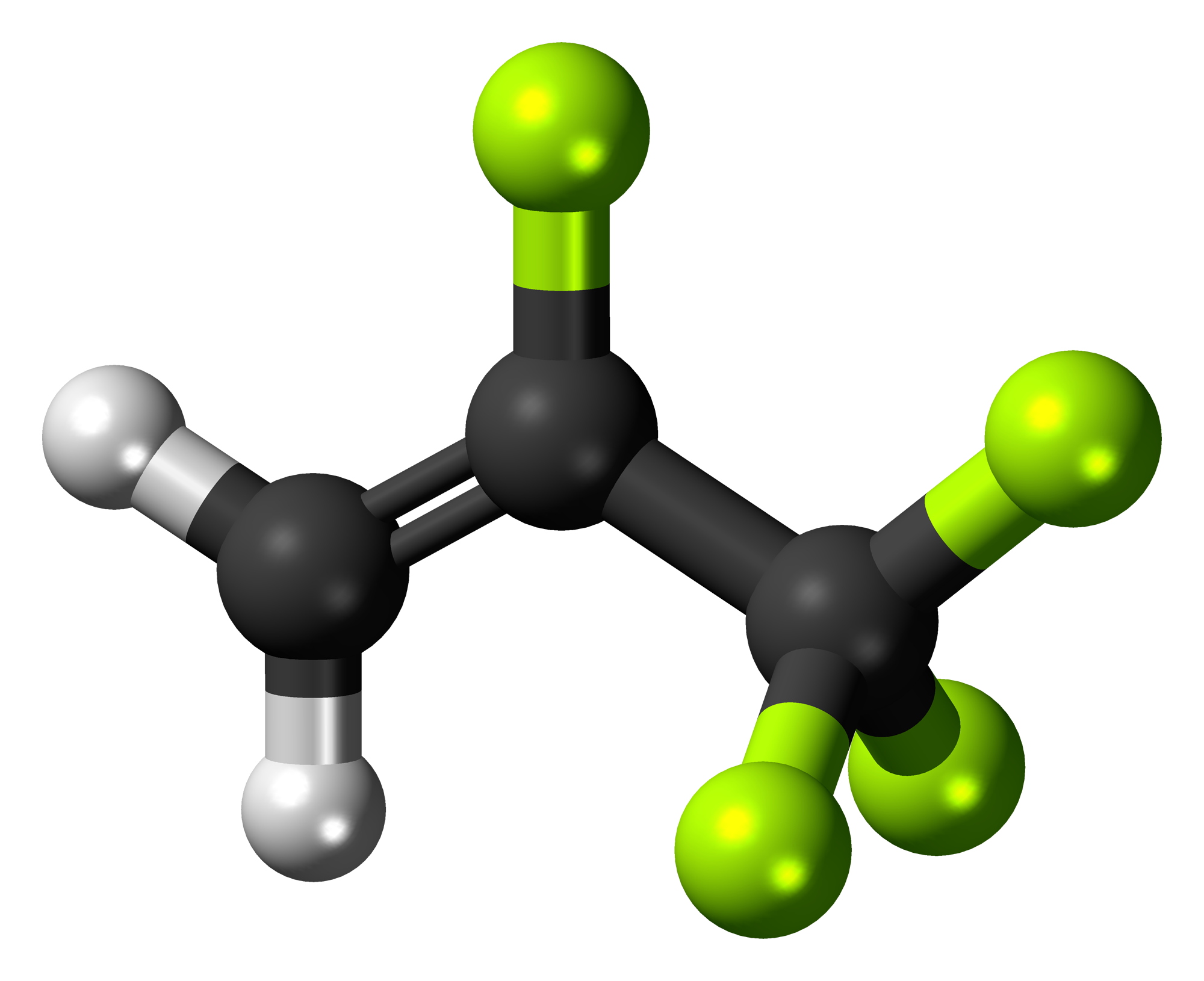

Names
- Preferred IUPAC name 2,3,3,3-Tetrafluoroprop-1-ene
- Other names HFO-1234yf; R1234yf; R-1234yf; 2,3,3,3-Tetrafluoropropylene

Identifiers
| CAS Number | 754-12-1 |
| 3D model (JSmol) | Interactive image; Interactive image |
| ChemSpider | 2057041 |
| ECHA InfoCard | 100.104.879 |
| EC Number | 468-710-7 |
| PubChem CID | 2776731 |
| UNII | P5N89242X3 |
| UN number | 3161 |
| CompTox Dashboard (EPA) | DTXSID4074728 |
- InChI: InChI=1S/C3H2F4/c1-2(4)3(5,6)7/h1H2 Key: FXRLMCRCYDHQFW-UHFFFAOYSA-N; InChI=1/C3H2F4/c1-2(4)3(5,6)7/h1H2 Key: FXRLMCRCYDHQFW-UHFFFAOYAB
- SMILES: C=C(F)C(F)(F)F; FC(=C)C(F)(F)F

Properties
| Chemical formula | C_{3}H_{2}F_{4} |
| Molar mass | 114 g/mol |
| Appearance | Colorless gas |
| Density | 1.1 g/cm^{3} at 25 °C (liquid); 4 (gas, relative, air is 1) |
| Boiling point | −30 °C (−22 °F; 243 K) |
| Solubility in water | 198.2 mg/L at 24 °C, 92/69/EEC, A.6 |
| log P | 2.15, n-octanol/water, 92/69/EEC, A.8 |
| Vapor pressure | 6,067 hPa at 21.1 °C; 14,203 hPa at 54.4 °C |

Hazards
- GHS labelling
| Pictograms | (GHS02: Flammable) |
| Hazard statements | H220 |
| Precautionary statements | P210, P260, P281, P308+P313, P410+P403 |
| Autoignition temperature | 405 °C (761 °F; 678 K) |
| Explosive limits | 6.2% vol.; 12.3% vol. |
- Except where otherwise noted, data are given for materials in their standard state (at 25 °C [77 °F], 100 kPa). verify (what is ?) Infobox references

2,3,3,3-Tetrafluoropropene, HFO-1234yf, is a hydrofluoroolefin (HFO) with molecular formula CH_{2}=CFCF_{3}. Its primary application is as a refrigerant with low global warming potential (GWP).

As a refrigerant, it is designated R-1234yf and marketed under the names Opteon YF by Chemours and as Solstice yf by Honeywell. R-1234yf is also a component of zeotropic refrigerant blend R-454B.

HFO-1234yf has a GWP less than carbon dioxide, itself 1,430 times less potent than R-134a. For this reason, 2,3,3,3‑tetrafluoropropene is the pre-eminent replacement for R-134a in vehicular air conditioners. As of 2022, 90% of new U.S. vehicles are estimated to use HFO-1234yf.

Unlike previous vehicular refrigerants, 2,3,3,3‑tetrafluoropropene is flammable; how much risk this poses is discussed below. One drawback is it breaks down into short-chain perfluorinated carboxylic acids (PFCAs), which are persistent organic pollutants.

== Adoption by automotive industry ==
HFO-1234yf was developed by a team at DuPont, led by Barbara Haviland Minor, jointly with researchers at Honeywell. Their goal was to meet European directive 2006/40/EC, which went into effect in 2011 and required that all new car platforms for sale in Europe use a refrigerant in its AC system with a global warming potential (GWP) less than 150 times more potent than carbon dioxide. HFO-1234yf was initially considered to have a 100-year GWP of 4, and is now considered to have a 100-year GWP lower than 1 (carbon dioxide has a GWP of 1.0).

Among the alternatives developed to comply with 2006/40/EC, HFO-1234yf had the lowest switching cost for automakers. It can be used as a "near drop-in replacement" for R-134a, the previous automobile AC refrigerant, which has a 100-year GWP of 1430. HFO-1234yf can be handled very similarly to R-134a in repair shops, although it requires some different, specialized equipment due to its flammability. Another issue affecting the compatibility between HFO-1234yf and R-134a-based systems is the choice of lubricating oil.

On July 23, 2010, General Motors announced that it would introduce HFO-1234yf in 2013 Chevrolet, Buick, GMC, and Cadillac models in the U.S. Shortly thereafter, Honeywell and DuPont announced that they would jointly build a manufacturing facility in Changshu, Jiangsu Province, China to produce HFO-1234yf. In 2012, Cadillac produced the first American car using R-1234yf. Since then, Chrysler, GMC, and Ford have all begun transitioning vehicles to R1234yf.

Japanese automakers are also transitioning to R1234yf. Honda and Subaru began to introduce the new refrigerant with the 2017 models. From 2017 to 2018, BMW changed all of its models to R-1234yf. As of 2018, 50% of new vehicles from original equipment manufacturers (OEMs) are estimated to use R-1234yf.

In 2017, Honeywell opened a new plant in Geismar, Louisiana, to handle increased demand for the compound. Honeywell and DuPont hold most patents issued for HFO-1234yf and remained the pre-eminent manufacturers in 2018.

=== Flammability ===
Although the product is classified slightly flammable by ASHRAE, several years of testing by SAE International proved that the product could not be ignited under conditions normally experienced by a vehicle. Tests conducted in 2008 indicated that ignition requires temperatures exceeding 900 °C (1,650 °F) and mixture with PAG oil. Once in flame, 2,3,3,3‑tetrafluoropropene releases highly corrosive and toxic gaseous hydrogen fluoride and carbonyl fluoride.

In August 2012, Mercedes-Benz showed that the substance ignited in simulated head-on collisions. A senior Daimler engineer who ran the tests, stated "We were frozen in shock, I am not going to deny it. We needed a day to comprehend what we had just seen." When researchers sprayed 2,3,3,3‑tetrafluoropropene and A/C compressor oil onto a car's hot engine, the mixture burned in two out of three times. In September, Daimler issued a press release, proposed a recall of cars using the refrigerant, and continued to use older refrigerants in its own designs. The German automakers argued for development of carbon dioxide refrigerants, which they argued would be safer.

In October 2012, SAE International established a new Cooperative Research Project, CRP1234-4, to extend its previous testing and investigate Daimler's claims. The investigation concluded that R-1234yf did not increase the estimated risk of vehicle fire exposure, because "the refrigerant release testing completed by Daimler was unrealistic" and "created extreme conditions that favored ignition". Germany's Kraftfahrt-Bundesamt (KBA, Federal Motor Transport Authority) also conducted its own tests. In their August 2013 report to the European Union, the KBA concluded that while R-1234yf was potentially more hazardous than R-134a, it did not constitute a serious danger. A 2024 CFD study in the International Journal of Refrigeration found R-1234yf stayed below its 6.2% LFL in simulated automotive evaporator leaks, while R-290 exceeded its 2.1% LFL at every monitoring point.

Writing for Auto Service Professional, Gordon Jacques summarized the controversy:

"The flammability issue has attracted a lot of attention, prompting the industry to conduct some serious third-party testing. The bottom line is this: The refrigerant will burn, but it takes a lot of heat to ignite it and it burns slowly. Almost every other fluid under the hood will light more easily and burn hotter than R1234yf, so the industry has determined that with proper A/C system design, it does not increase the chances of fire in the vehicle."

Mixing HFO-1234yf with 10–11% R-134A is in development to produce a hybrid gas under review by ASHRAE for classification as A2L which is described as "virtually non-flammable". These gases are under review with the names of R451A and R451B. These mixes have GWP of ~147.

Other additives have been proposed for lowering the flammability of HFO-1234yf, such as trifluoroiodomethane, which has a low GWP due to its short atmospheric lifetime, but is slightly mutagenic.

== In the environment ==
In open atmosphere, R-1234yf degrades to trifluoroacetic acid (TFA(A)), which may accumulate in water.

Other HFOs have been show to produce HFC-23 as a secondary atmospheric breakdown product. HFC-23 is a very potent greenhouse gas with a GWP100 of 14,800. However, HFO-1234yf has not been found to form HFC-23.

== See also ==
- 1,3,3,3-Tetrafluoropropene (HFO-1234ze)
