= 1,1,1,2-Tetrafluoroethane (data page) =

Chemical data page

This page lists chemical and physical properties of 1,1,1,2-tetrafluoroethane.

Physical Properties	HFC-134a
Boiling Point at 1 atm	−15.34 °F (−26.30 °C)
Freezing Point	−153.9 °F (−103.3 °C)
Critical Temperature	213.9 °F (101.1 °C)
Critical Pressure	4060 kPa (588.9 lb/in^{2} abs)
Critical Volume	1.94 × 10^{−3} m^{3}/kg (0.031 ft^{3}/lb)
Critical Density	515.3 kg/m^{3} (32.17 lb/ft^{3})
Density (Liquid) at 25 °C	1206 kg/m^{3} (75.28 lb/ft^{3})
Density (Saturated Vapor) at boiling point	5.25 kg/m^{3} (0.328 lb/ft^{3})
Heat Capacity (Liquid) at 25 °C	0.339 kcal/kg·K
Heat Capacity (Vapor at Constant Pressure) at 25 °C and 1 atm	0.204 kcal/kg·K
Vapor Pressure at 25 °C	666.1 kPa
Heat of Vaporization at Boiling Point	217.2 kJ/kg (93.4 Btu/lb)
Thermal Conductivity at 25 °C, liquid	0.0824 W/m·K (0.0478 Btu/hr·ft°F)
Thermal Conductivity at 25 °C vapor at 1 atm	0.0145 W/m·K (0.00836 Btu/hr·ft°F)
Viscosity at 25 °C, liquid	0.202 mPa·S (cP)
Viscosity at 25 °C, vapor at 1 atm	0.012 mPa·S (cP)
Solubility in water at 25 °C and 1 atm	0.15% by weight
Solubility of water in HFC-134a at 25 °C	0.11% by weight
Flammability Limits in Air at 1 atm	None
Autoignition temperature	770 °C (1,420 °F)
Ozone depletion potential	0
Halocarbon Global Warming Potential (HGWP) (For CFC-11, HGWP = 1)	0.28
Global Warming Potential (GWP) (100 yr ITH. For CO_{2}, GWP = 1)	1,200
Toxicity Acceptable Exposure Limit* (8- and 12-hr time-weighted average)	1,000 ppm (v/v)

* Acceptable Exposure Limit (AEL) is an airborne inhalation exposure limit established by DuPont that specifies time-weighted average concentrations to which nearly all workers may be repeatedly exposed without adverse effects.

This box:
- Except where noted otherwise, data relate to Standard temperature and pressure.
- Reliability of data general note.
