= Chlorodifluoromethane =

Chemical propellant and refrigerant

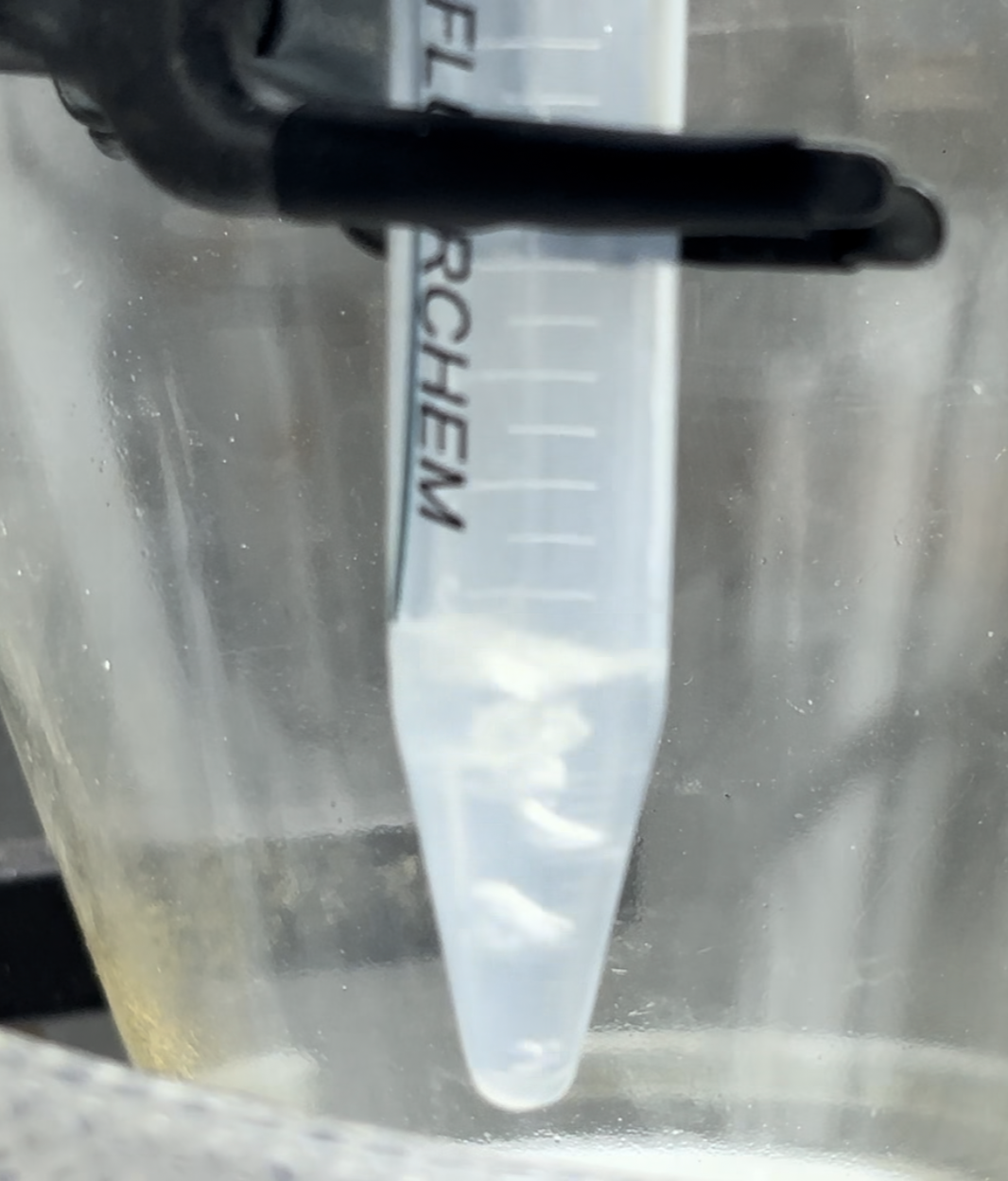
- Liquefied chlorodifluoromethane boiling when exposed to ambient temperature and pressure.

Names
- Preferred IUPAC name Chloro(difluoro)methane
- Other names Chlorodifluoromethane; Difluoromonochloromethane; Monochlorodifluoromethane; HCFC-22; R-22; Genetron 22; Freon 22; Arcton 4 Arcton 22; UN 1018; Difluorochloromethane; Fluorocarbon-22; Refrigerant 22

Identifiers
CAS Number	75-45-6
3D model (JSmol)	Interactive image
ChEMBL	ChEMBL116155
ChemSpider	6132
ECHA InfoCard	100.000.793
EC Number	200-871-9
KEGG	C19361
PubChem CID	6372
RTECS number	PA6390000
UNII	ZFO627O6CN
UN number	1018
CompTox Dashboard (EPA)	DTXSID6020301
- InChI: InChI=1S/CHClF2/c2-1(3)4/h1H Key: VOPWNXZWBYDODV-UHFFFAOYSA-N; InChI=1/CHClF2/c2-1(3)4/h1H Key: VOPWNXZWBYDODV-UHFFFAOYAQ
- SMILES: ClC(F)F

Properties
Chemical formula	CHClF_{2}
Molar mass	86.47 g/mol
Appearance	Colorless gas
Odor	Sweetish
Density	3.66 kg/m^{3} at 15 °C, gas
Melting point	−175.42 °C (−283.76 °F; 97.73 K)
Boiling point	−40.7 °C (−41.3 °F; 232.5 K)
Solubility in water	0.7799 vol/vol at 25 °C; 3.628 g/L
log P	1.08
Vapor pressure	908 kPa at 20 °C
Henry's law constant (k_{H})	0.033 mol⋅kg^{−1}⋅bar^{−1}
Magnetic susceptibility (χ)	−38.6·10^{−6} cm^{3}/mol

Structure
Molecular shape	Tetrahedral

Hazards
- Occupational safety and health (OHS/OSH)
Main hazards	Dangerous for the environment (N), Central nervous system depressant, Carc. Cat. 3
- GHS labelling
Pictograms	(GHS07: Exclamation mark)
Signal word	Warning
Hazard statements	H420
Precautionary statements	P202, P262, P271, P403
NFPA 704 (fire diamond)	1 0 1
Flash point	nonflammable
Autoignition temperature	632 °C (1,170 °F; 905 K)
- NIOSH (US health exposure limits)
PEL (Permissible)	None
REL (Recommended)	TWA 1000 ppm (3500 mg/m^{3}) ST 1250 ppm (4375 mg/m^{3})
IDLH (Immediate danger)	N.D.
- Except where otherwise noted, data are given for materials in their standard state (at 25 °C [77 °F], 100 kPa). verify (what is ?) Infobox references

Chlorodifluoromethane or difluoromonochloromethane is a hydrochlorofluorocarbon (HCFC). This colorless gas is better known as HCFC-22, or R-22, or CHClF_{2}. It was commonly used as a propellant and refrigerant. These applications were phased out under the Montreal Protocol in developed countries in 2020 due to the compound's ozone depletion potential (ODP) and high global warming potential (GWP), and in developing countries this process will be completed by 2030. R-22 is a versatile intermediate in industrial organofluorine chemistry, e.g. as a precursor to tetrafluoroethylene.

== Production and current applications ==
Worldwide production of R-22 in 2008 was about 800 Gg per year, up from about 450 Gg per year in 1998, with most production in developing countries. R-22 use is being phased out in developing countries, where it is largely used for air conditioning applications.

R-22 is prepared from chloroform:

HCCl_{3} + 2 HF → HCF_{2}Cl + 2 HCl

An important application of R-22 is as a precursor to tetrafluoroethylene. This conversion involves pyrolysis to give difluorocarbene, which dimerizes:

2 CHClF_{2} → C_{2}F_{4} + 2 HCl

The compound also yields difluorocarbene upon treatment with strong base and is used in the laboratory as a source of this reactive intermediate.

The pyrolysis of R-22 in the presence of chlorofluoromethane gives hexafluorobenzene.

== Environmental effects ==
R-22 is often used as an alternative to the highly ozone-depleting CFC-11 and CFC-12, because of its relatively low ozone depletion potential of 0.055, among the lowest for chlorine-containing haloalkanes. However, even this lower ozone depletion potential is no longer considered acceptable.

As an additional environmental concern, R-22 is a powerful greenhouse gas with a GWP equal to 1810 (which indicates 1810 times as powerful as carbon dioxide). Hydrofluorocarbons (HFCs) are often substituted for R-22 because of their lower ozone depletion potential, but these refrigerants often have a higher GWP. R-410A, for example, is often substituted, but has a GWP of 2088. Another substitute is R-404A with a GWP of 3900. Other substitute refrigerants are available with low GWP. Ammonia (R-717), with a GWP of <1, remains a popular substitute on fishing vessels and large industrial applications. Ammonia's toxicity in high concentrations limit its application in small-scale refrigeration applications.

Propane (R-290) is another example, and has a GWP of 3. Propane was the de facto refrigerant in systems smaller than industrial scale before the introduction of CFCs. The reputation of propane refrigerators as a fire hazard kept delivered ice and the ice box the overwhelming consumer choice despite its inconvenience and higher cost until safe CFC systems overcame the negative perceptions of refrigerators. Illegal to use as a refrigerant in the US for decades, propane is now permitted for use in limited mass suitable for small refrigerators. It is not lawful to use in air conditioners or larger refrigerators because of its flammability and potential for explosion.

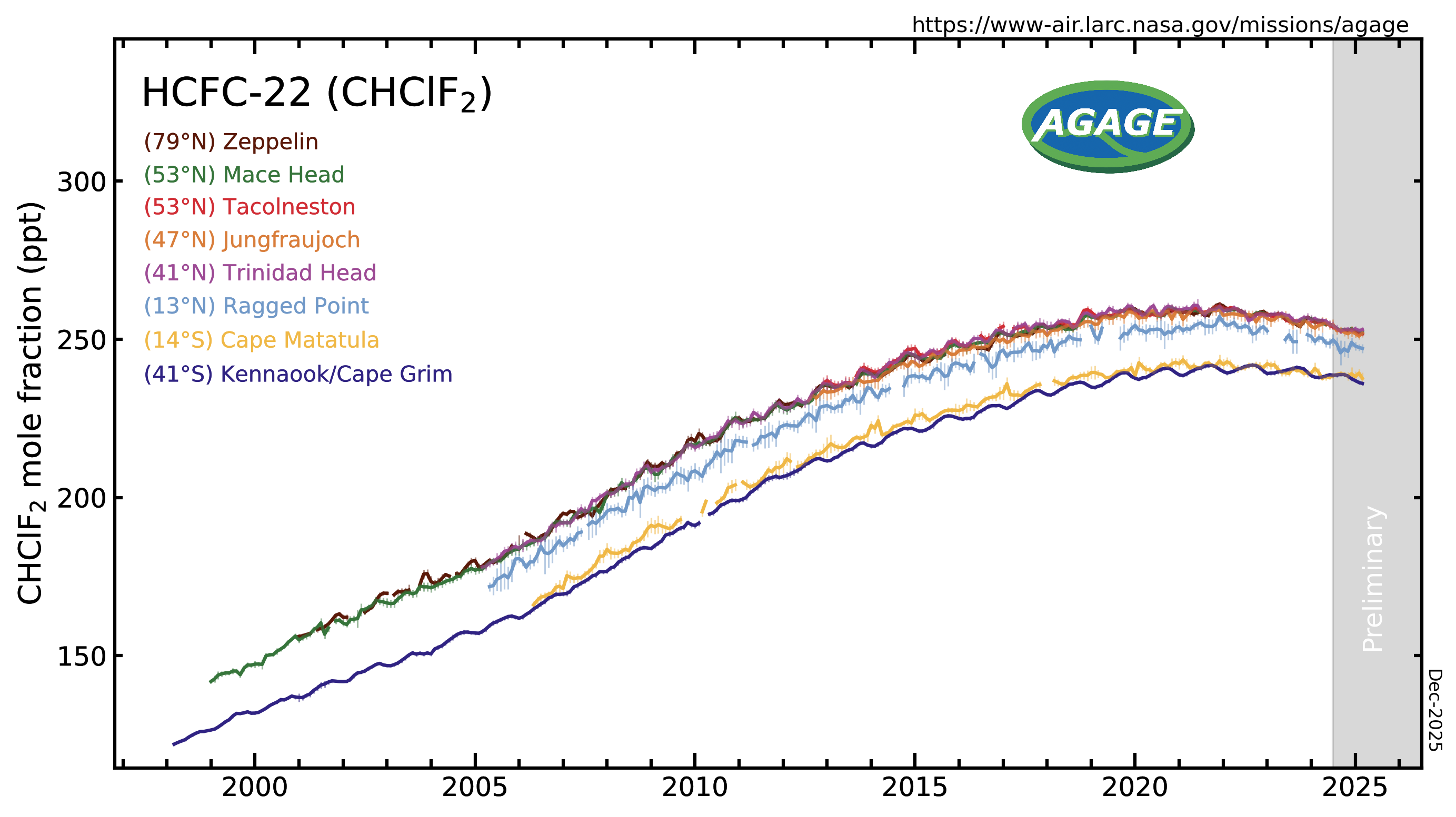
HCFC-22 measured by the Advanced Global Atmospheric Gases Experiment (AGAGE) in the lower atmosphere (troposphere) at stations around the world. Abundances are given as pollution free monthly mean mole fractions in parts-per-trillion.

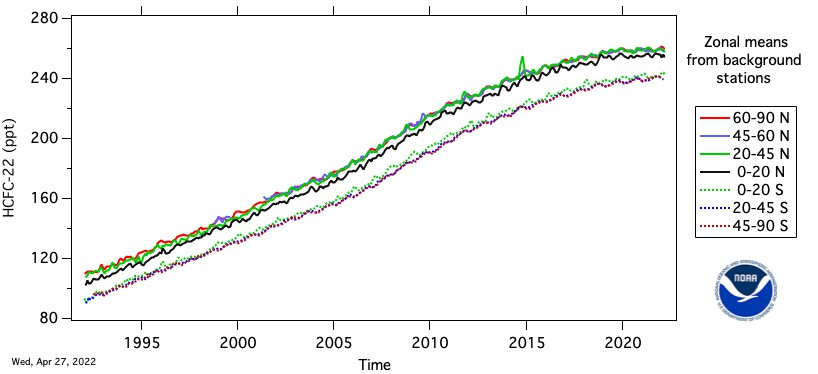
Growth of R-22 (CFC-22) abundance in Earth's atmosphere since year 1992.

== Phaseout in the European Union ==
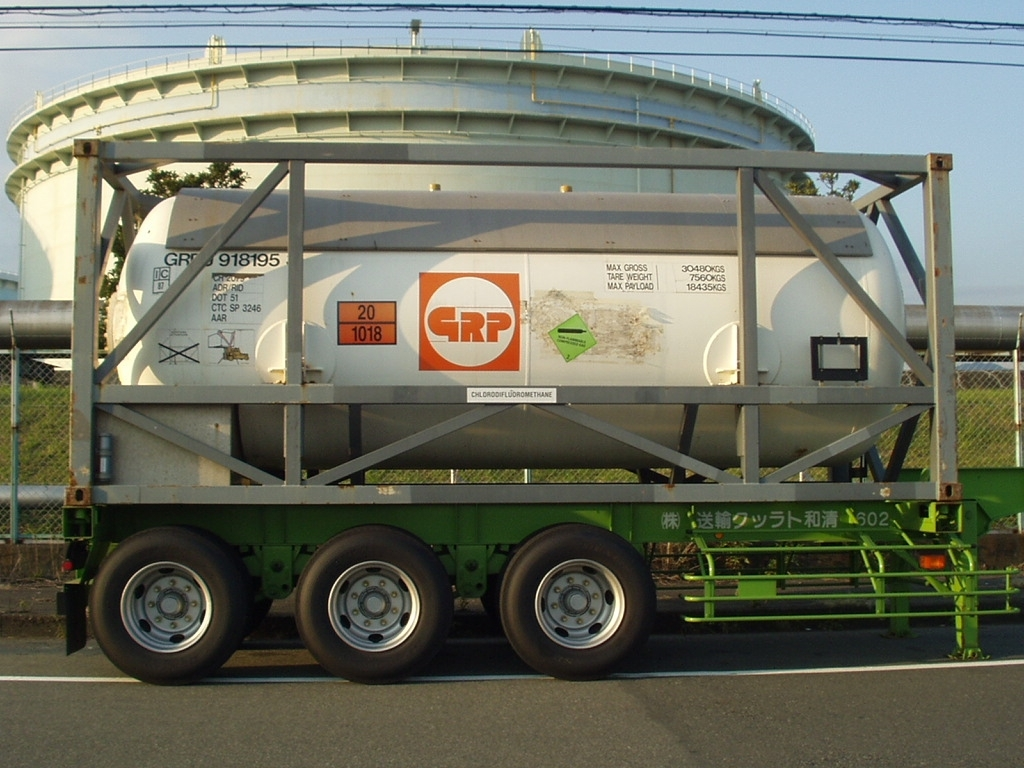
Shipping container for the gas in Japan.

Since 1 January 2010, it has been illegal to use newly manufactured HCFCs to service refrigeration and air-conditioning equipment; only reclaimed and recycled HCFCs may be used. In practice this means that the gas has to be removed from the equipment before servicing and replaced afterwards, rather than refilling with new gas.

Since 1 January 2015, it has been illegal to use any HCFCs to service refrigeration and air-conditioning equipment; broken equipment that used HCFC refrigerants must be replaced with equipment that does not use them.

== Phaseout in the United States ==
R-22 was mostly phased out in new equipment in the United States by regulatory action by the EPA under the Significant New Alternatives Program (SNAP) by rules 20 and 21 of the program, due to its high global warming potential. The EPA program was consistent with the Montreal Accords, but international agreements must be ratified by the US Senate to have legal effect. A 2017 decision of the US Court of Appeals for the District of Columbia Circuit held that the US EPA lacked authority to regulate the use of R-22 under SNAP. In essence the court ruled the EPA's statutory authority was for ozone reduction, not global warming. The EPA subsequently issued guidance to the effect that the EPA would no longer regulate R-22. A 2018 ruling by the same court held that the EPA failed to conform with required procedure when it issued its guidance pursuant to the 2017 ruling, voiding the guidance, but not the prior ruling that required it. The refrigeration and air conditioning industry had already discontinued production of new R-22 equipment. The practical effect of these rulings is to reduce the cost of imported R-22 to maintain aging equipment, extending its service life, while preventing the use of R-22 in new equipment.

=== R-22, retrofit using substitute refrigerants ===
The energy efficiency and system capacity of systems designed for R-22 is slightly greater using R-22 than the available substitutes.

R-407A is for use in low- and medium-temp refrigeration. Uses a polyolester (POE) oil.

R-407C is for use in air conditioning. Uses a minimum of 20 percent POE oil.

R-407F and R-407H are for use in medium- and low-temperature refrigeration applications (supermarkets, cold storage, and process refrigeration); direct expansion system design only. They use a POE oil.

R-421A is for use in "air conditioning split systems, heat pumps, supermarket pak systems, dairy chillers, reach-in storage, bakery applications, refrigerated transport, self-contained display cabinets, and walk-in coolers". Uses mineral oil (MO), Alkylbenzene (AB), and POE.

R-422B is for use in low-, medium-, and high-temperature applications. It is not recommended for use in flooded applications.

R-422C is for use in medium- and low-temperature applications. The TXV power element will need to be changed to a 404A/507A element and critical seals (elastomers) may need to be replaced.

R-422D is for use in low-temp applications, and is mineral oil compatible.

R-424A is for use in air conditioning as well as medium-temp refrigeration temperature ranges of 20 to 50˚F. It works with MO, alkylbenzenes (AB), and POE oils.

R-427A is for use in air conditioning and refrigeration applications. It does not require all the mineral oil to be removed. It works with MO, AB, and POE oils.

R-434A is for use in water cooled and process chillers for air conditioning and medium- and low-temperature applications. It works with MO, AB, and POE oils.

R-438A (MO-99) is for use in low-, medium-, and high-temperature applications. It is compatible with all lubricants.

R-458A is for use in air conditioning and refrigeration applications, without capacity or efficiency loss. Works with MO, AB, and POE oils.

R-32 or HFC-32 (difluoromethane) is for use in air conditioning and refrigeration applications. It has zero ozone depletion potential (ODP) [2] and a global warming potential (GWP) index 675 times that of carbon dioxide.

== Physical properties ==
Property	Value
Density (ρ) at −69 °C (liquid)	1.49 g⋅cm^{−3}
Density (ρ) at −41 °C (liquid)	1.413 g⋅cm^{−3}
Density (ρ) at −41 °C (gas)	4.706 kg⋅m^{−3}
Density (ρ) at 15 °C (gas)	3.66 kg⋅m^{−3}
Specific gravity at 21 °C (gas)	3.08 (air is 1)
Specific volume (ν) at 21 °C (gas)	0.275 m^{3}⋅kg^{−1}
Density (ρ) at 15 °C (gas)	3.66 kg⋅m^{−3}
Triple point temperature (T_{t})	−157.39 °C (115.76 K)
Critical temperature (T_{c})	96.2 °C (369.3 K)
Critical pressure (p_{c})	4.936 MPa (49.36 bar)
Vapor pressure at 21.1 °C (p_{c})	0.9384 MPa (9.384 bar)
Critical density (ρ_{c})	6.1 mol⋅l^{−1}
Latent heat of vaporization (l_{v}) at boiling point (−40.7 °C)	233.95 kJ⋅kg^{−1}
Heat capacity at constant pressure (C_{p}) at 30 °C (86 °F)	0.057 kJ.mol^{−1}⋅K^{−1}
Heat capacity at constant volume (C_{v}) at 30 °C (86 °F)	0.048 kJ⋅mol^{−1}⋅K^{−1}
Heat capacity ratio (γ) at 30 °C (86 °F)	1.178253
Compressibility factor (Z) at 15 °C	0.9831
Acentric factor (ω)	0.22082
Molecular dipole moment	1.458 D
Viscosity (η) at 0 °C	12.56 μPa⋅s (0.1256 cP)
Ozone depletion potential (ODP)	0.055 (CCl_{3}F is 1)
Global warming potential (GWP)	1810 (CO_{2} is 1)

It has two allotropes: crystalline II below 59 K and crystalline I above 59 K and below 115.73 K.

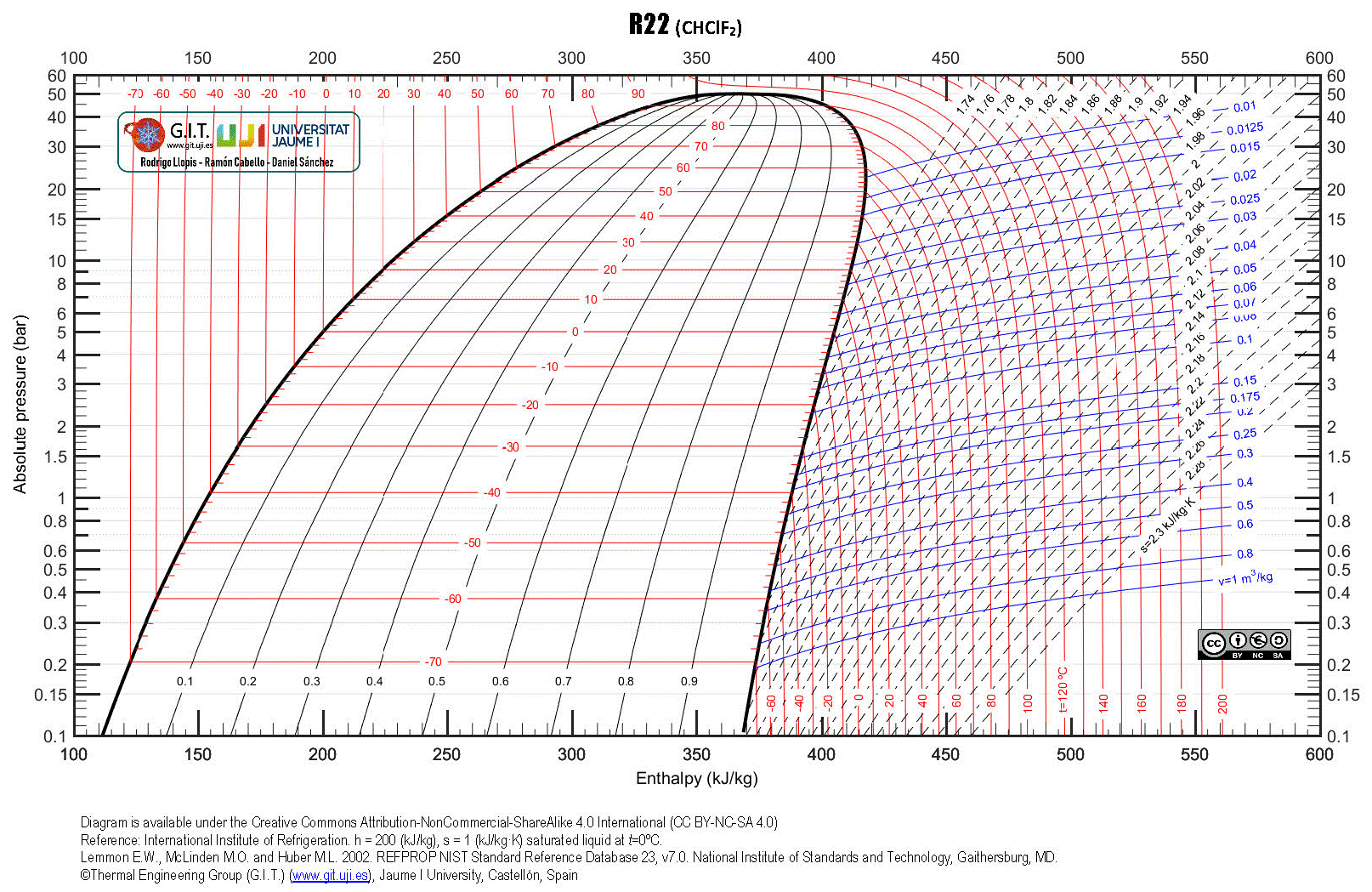
The pressure-enthalpy properties of R22, obtained using REFPROP version 9.0 and the International Institute of Refrigeration reference.

Thermal and physical properties of saturated liquid refrigerant 22:
Temperature (K)	Density (kg/m^3)	Specific heat (kJ/kg K)	Dynamic viscosity (kg/m s)	Kinematic viscosity (m^2/s)	Conductivity (W/m K)	Thermal diffusivity (m^2/s)	Prandtl Number	Bulk modulus (K^-1)
230	1416	1.087	3.56E-04	2.51E-07	0.1145	7.44E-08	3.4	0.00205
240	1386.6	1.1	3.15E-04	2.27E-07	0.1098	7.20E-08	3.2	0.00216
250	1356.3	1.117	2.80E-04	2.06E-07	0.1052	6.95E-08	3	0.00229
260	1324.9	1.137	2.50E-04	1.88E-07	0.1007	6.68E-08	2.8	0.00245
270	1292.1	1.161	2.24E-04	1.73E-07	0.0962	6.41E-08	2.7	0.00263
280	1257.9	1.189	2.01E-04	1.59E-07	0.0917	6.13E-08	2.6	0.00286
290	1221.7	1.223	1.80E-04	1.47E-07	0.0872	5.83E-08	2.5	0.00315
300	1183.4	1.265	1.61E-04	1.36E-07	0.0826	5.52E-08	2.5	0.00351
310	1142.2	1.319	1.44E-04	1.26E-07	0.0781	5.18E-08	2.4	0.004
320	1097.4	1.391	1.28E-04	1.17E-07	0.0734	4.81E-08	2.4	0.00469
330	1047.5	1.495	1.13E-04	1.08E-07	0.0686	4.38E-08	2.5	0.00575
340	990.1	1.665	9.80E-05	9.89E-08	0.0636	3.86E-08	2.6	0.00756
350	920.1	1.997	8.31E-05	9.04E-08	0.0583	3.17E-08	2.8	0.01135
360	823.4	3.001	6.68E-05	8.11E-08	0.0531	2.15E-08	3.8	0.02388

== Price history and availability ==
Refrigerants price history

EPA's analysis indicated the amount of existing inventory was between 22,700t and 45,400t.

Year	2010	2011	2012	2013	2014	2015–2019	2020
R-22 Virgin (t)	49,900	45,400	25,100	25,600	20,200	TBD	0
R-22 Recoupment (t)	--	--	--	2,950	2,950	--	--
R-22 Total (t)	49,900	45,400	25,100	28,600	23,100	--	--

In 2012 the EPA reduced the amount of R-22 by 45%, causing the price to rise by more than 300%. For 2013, the EPA has reduced the amount of R-22 by 29%.
