= Hydrofluorocarbon =

Synthetic organic compounds

Fluoromethane, a hydrofluorocarbon.

Hydrofluorocarbons (HFCs) are synthetic organic compounds that contain fluorine and hydrogen atoms, and are the most common type of organofluorine compounds. Most are gases at room temperature and pressure. They are frequently used in air conditioning and as refrigerants; R-134a (1,1,1,2-tetrafluoroethane) is one of the most commonly used HFC refrigerants. In order to aid the recovery of the stratospheric ozone layer, HFCs were adopted to replace the more potent chlorofluorocarbons (CFCs) such as R-12, which were phased out from use by the Montreal Protocol, and hydrochlorofluorocarbons (HCFCs) such as R-21 which are presently being phased out. HFCs are also used in insulating foams, aerosol propellants, as solvents and for fire protection.

While HFCs do not degrade the ozone layer to the same degree as the compounds they replace, they still contribute to global warming. For example, trifluoromethane (CHF_{3} or R-23) has 11,700 times the warming potential of carbon dioxide. HFC atmospheric concentrations and contribution to anthropogenic greenhouse gas emissions are rapidly increasing – consumption rose from near zero in 1990 to 1.2 billion tons of carbon dioxide equivalent in 2010 – causing international concern about their radiative forcing.

== Chemistry ==
Fluorocarbons with few C–F bonds behave similarly to the parent hydrocarbons, but their reactivity can be altered significantly. For example, both uracil and 5-fluorouracil are colourless, high-melting crystalline solids, but the latter is a potent anti-cancer drug. The use of the C–F bond in pharmaceuticals is predicated on this altered reactivity. Several drugs and agrochemicals contain only one fluorine center or one trifluoromethyl group.

== Environmental regulation ==
Unlike other greenhouse gases in the Paris Agreement, hydrofluorocarbons are included in other international negotiations.

In September 2016, the New York Declaration on Forests urged a global reduction in the use of HFCs. On 15 October 2016, due to these chemicals' contribution to climate change, negotiators from 197 nations meeting at a summit of the United Nations Environment Programme in Kigali, Rwanda reached a legally-binding accord (the Kigali Amendment) to phase down HFCs in an amendment to the Montreal Protocol. As of February 2020, 16 U.S. states ban or are phasing down HFCs.

COVID-19 relief legislation, which included a measure that would require chemical manufacturers to phase down the production and use of HFCs, was passed by the United States House of Representatives and United States Senate on 21 December 2020. The U.S. Environmental Protection Agency signed a final rule phasing down HFCs on 23 September 2021. President Trump has announced a rollback of regulations on super pollutants, specifically targeting potent greenhouse gases used in refrigeration and air conditioning in May 2026.

== See also ==
- Greenhouse gas § Sources - comparative chart
