= Zeotropic mixture =

Type of chemical mixture

A zeotropic mixture, or non-azeotropic mixture, is a mixture with liquid components that have different boiling points. For example, a mixture of nitrogen, methane, ethane, propane, and isobutane constitutes a zeotropic mixture. Individual substances within the mixture do not evaporate or condense at the same temperature as one substance. In other words, the mixture has a temperature glide, as the phase change occurs in a temperature range of about four to seven degrees Celsius, rather than at a constant temperature. On temperature-composition graphs, this temperature glide can be seen as the temperature difference between the bubble point and dew point. For zeotropic mixtures, the temperatures on the bubble (boiling) curve are between the individual component's boiling temperatures. When a zeotropic mixture is boiled or condensed, the composition of the liquid and the vapor changes according to the mixtures's temperature-composition diagram. Zeotropic mixtures have different characteristics in nucleate and convective boiling, as well as in the organic Rankine cycle. Because zeotropic mixtures have different properties than pure fluids or azeotropic mixtures, zeotropic mixtures have many unique applications in industry, namely in distillation, refrigeration, and cleaning processes.

== Dew and bubble points ==
Figure 1: Temperature-Composition diagram of a zeotropic mixture

In mixtures of substances, the bubble point is the saturated liquid temperature, whereas the saturated vapor temperature is called the dew point. Because the bubble and dew lines of a zeotropic mixture's temperature-composition diagram do not intersect, a zeotropic mixture in its liquid phase has a different fraction of a component than the gas phase of the mixture. On a temperature-composition diagram, after a mixture in its liquid phase is heated to the temperature at the bubble (boiling) curve, the fraction of a component in the mixture changes along an isothermal line connecting the dew curve to the boiling curve as the mixture boils.

At any given temperature, the composition of the liquid is the composition at the bubble point, whereas the composition of the vapor is the composition at the dew point. Unlike azeotropic mixtures, there is no azeotropic point at any temperature on the diagram where the bubble line and dew lines would intersect. Thus, the composition of the mixture will always change between the bubble and dew point component fractions upon boiling from a liquid to a gas until the mass fraction of a component reaches 1 (i.e. the zeotropic mixture is completely separated into its pure components). As shown in Figure 1, the mole fraction of component 1 decreases from 0.4 to around 0.15 as the liquid mixture boils to the gas phase.

=== Temperature glides ===
Temperature glide is the difference between the bubble point and the dew point. Different zeotropic mixtures have different temperature glides. For example, zeotropic mixture R152a/R245fa has a higher temperature glide than R21/R245fa. A larger gap between the boiling points creates a larger temperature glide between the boiling curve and dew curve at a given mass fraction. However, with any zeotropic mixture, the temperature glide decreases when the mass fraction of a component approaches 1 or 0 (i.e. when the mixture is almost separated into its pure components) because the boiling and dew curves get closer near these mass fractions.

A larger difference in boiling points between the substances also affects the dew and bubble curves of the graph. A larger difference in boiling points creates a larger shift in mass fractions when the mixture boils at a given temperature.

=== Zeotropic vs. azeotropic mixtures ===
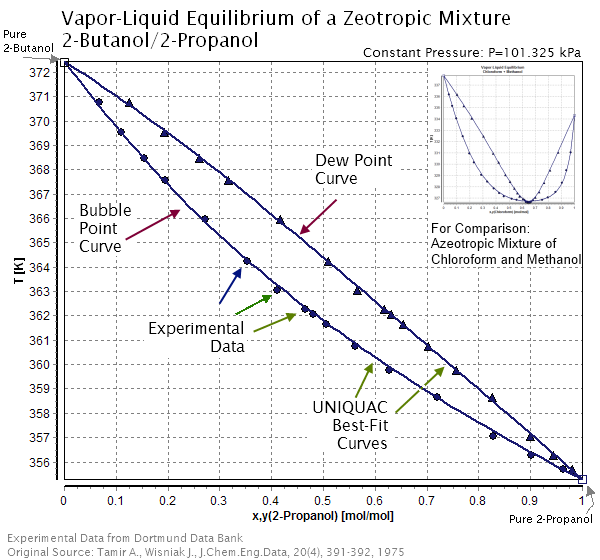
Figure 2: Bubble and Dew Curves for Zeotropic Mixtures

Azeotropic and zeotropic mixtures have different dew and bubble curves characteristics in a temperature-composition graph. Namely, azeotropic mixtures have dew and bubble curves that intersect, but zeotropic mixtures do not. In other words, zeotropic mixtures have no azeotropic points. An azeotropic mixture that is near its azeotropic point has negligible zeotropic behavior and is near-azeotropic rather than zeotropic.

Zeotropic mixtures differ from azeotropic mixtures in that the vapor and liquid phases of an azeotropic mixture have the same fraction of constituents. This is due to the constant boiling point of the azeotropic mixture.

== Boiling ==
When superheating a substance, nucleate pool boiling and convective flow boiling occur when the temperature of the surface used to heat a liquid is higher than the liquid's boiling point by the wall superheat.

=== Nucleate pool boiling ===
The characteristics of pool boiling are different for zeotropic mixtures than that of pure mixtures. For example, the minimum superheating needed to achieve this boiling is greater for zeotropic mixtures than for pure liquids because of the different proportions of individual substances in the liquid versus gas phases of the zeotropic mixture. Zeotropic mixtures and pure liquids also have different critical heat fluxes. In addition, the heat transfer coefficients of zeotropic mixtures are less than the ideal values predicted using the coefficients of pure liquids. This decrease in heat transfer is due to the fact that the heat transfer coefficients of zeotropic mixtures do not increase proportionately with the mass fractions of the mixture's components.

=== Convective flow boiling ===
Zeotropic mixtures have different characteristics in convective boiling than pure substances or azeotropic mixtures. Overall, zeotropic mixtures transfer heat more efficiently at the bottom of the fluid, whereas pure and azeotropic substances transfer heat better at the top. During convective flow boiling, the thickness of the liquid film is less at the top of the film than at the bottom because of gravity. In the case of pure liquids and azeotropic mixtures, this decrease in thickness causes a decrease in the resistance to heat transfer. Thus, more heat is transferred and the heat transfer coefficient is higher at the top of the film. The opposite occurs for zeotropic mixtures. The decrease in film thickness near the top causes the component in the mixture with the higher boiling point to decrease in mass fraction. Thus, the resistance to mass transfer increases near the top of the liquid. Less heat is transferred, and the heat transfer coefficient is lower than at the bottom of the liquid film. Because the bottom of the liquid transfers heat better, it requires a lower wall temperature near the bottom than at the top to boil the zeotropic mixture.

=== Heat transfer coefficient ===
From low cryogenic to room temperatures, the heat transfer coefficients of zeotropic mixtures are sensitive to the mixture's composition, the diameter of the boiling tube, heat and mass fluxes, and the roughness of the surface. In addition, diluting the zeotropic mixture reduces the heat transfer coefficient. Decreasing the pressure when boiling the mixture only increases the coefficient slightly. Using grooved rather than smooth boiling tubes increases the heat transfer coefficient.

== Distillation ==
Figure 3 Distillation Column. Feed mixture enters from the middle of the column. Low-boiling component collects in the top rectifying section, while high-boiling component collects in the bottom stripping section.

The ideal case of distillation uses zeotropic mixtures. Zeotropic fluid and gaseous mixtures can be separated by distillation due to the difference in boiling points between the component mixtures. This process involves the use of vertically-arranged distillation columns (see Figure 2).

=== Distillation columns ===
When separating zeotropic mixtures with three or greater liquid components, each distillation column removes only the lowest-boiling point component and the highest boiling point component. In other words, each column separates two components purely. If three substances are separated with a single column, the substance with the intermediate boiling point will not be purely separated, and a second column would be needed. To separate mixtures consisting of multiple substances, a sequence of distillation columns must be used. This multi-step distillation process is also called rectification.

In each distillation column, pure components form at the top (rectifying section) and bottom (stripping section) of the column when the starting liquid (called feed composition) is released in the middle of the column. This is shown in Figure 2. At a certain temperature, the component with the lowest boiling point (called distillate or overhead fraction) vaporizes and collects at the top of the column, whereas the component with the highest boiling point (called bottoms or bottom fraction) collects at the bottom of the column. In a zeotropic mixture, where more than one component exists, individual components move relative to each other as vapor flows up and liquid falls down.

The separation of mixtures can be seen in a concentration profile. In a concentration profile, the position of a vapor in the distillation column is plotted against the concentration of the vapor. The component with the highest boiling point has a max concentration at the bottom of the column, where the component with the lowest boiling point has a max concentration at the top of the column. The component with the intermediate boiling point has a max concentration in the middle of the distillation column. Because of how these mixtures separate, mixtures with greater than three substances require more than one distillation column to separate the components.

=== Distillation configurations ===
Many configurations can be used to separate mixtures into the same products, though some schemes are more efficient, and different column sequencings are used to achieve different needs. For example, a zeotropic mixture ABC can be first separated into A and BC before separating BC to B and C. On the other hand, mixture ABC can be first separated into AB and C, and AB can lastly be separated into A and B. These two configurations are sharp-split configurations in which the intermediate boiling substance does not contaminate each separation step. On the other hand, the mixture ABC could first be separated into AB and BC, and lastly split into A, B, and C in the same column. This is a non-sharp split configuration in which the substance with the intermediate boiling point is present in different mixtures after a separation step.

=== Efficiency optimization ===
When designing distillation processes for separating zeotropic mixtures, the sequencing of distillation columns is vital to saving energy and costs. In addition, other methods can be used to lower the energy or equipment costs required to distill zeotropic mixtures. This includes combining distillation columns, using side columns, combining main columns with side columns, and re-using waste heat for the system. After combining distillation columns, the amount of energy used is only that of one separated column rather than both columns combined. In addition, using side columns saves energy by preventing different columns from carrying out the same separation of mixtures. Combining main and side columns saves equipment costs by reducing the number of heat exchangers in the system. Re-using waste heat requires the amount of heat and temperature levels of the waste to match that of the heat needed. Thus, using waste heat requires changing the pressure inside evaporators and condensers of the distillation system in order to control the temperatures needed.

Controlling the temperature levels in a part of a system is possible with pinch analysis. These energy-saving techniques have a wide application in industrial distillation of zeotropic mixtures: side columns have been used to refine crude oil, and combining main and side columns is increasingly used.

=== Examples of zeotropic mixtures ===
Examples of distillation for zeotropic mixtures can be found in industry. Refining crude oil is an example of multi-component distillation in industry that has been used for more than 75 years. Crude oil is separated into five components with main and side columns in a sharp split configuration. In addition, ethylene is separated from methane and ethane for industrial purposes using multi-component distillation.

Separating aromatic substances requires extractive distillation, for example, distilling a zeotropic mixture of benzene, toluene, and p-xylene.

== Refrigeration ==
Zeotropic mixtures that are used in refrigeration are assigned a number in the 400 series to help identify its component and their proportions as a part of nomenclature. Whereas for azeotropic mixtures they are assigned a number in the 500 series. According to ASHRAE, refrigerants names start with 'R' followed by a series of numbers—400 series if it is zeotropic or 500 if it is azeotropic—followed by uppercase letters that denote the composition.

Research has proposed using zeotropic mixtures as substitutes to halogenated refrigerants due to the harmful effects that hydrochlorofluorocarbons (HCFC) and chlorofluorocarbons (CFC) have on the ozone layer and global warming. Researchers have focused on using new mixtures that have the same properties as past refrigerants to phase out harmful halogenated substances, in accordance to the Montreal Protocol and Kyoto Protocol. For example, researchers found that zeotropic mixture R-404A can replace R-12, a CFC, in household refrigerators. However, there are some technical difficulties in using zeotropic mixtures. This includes leakages, as well as the high temperature glide associated with substances of different boiling points, though the temperature glide can be matched to the temperature difference between the two refrigerants when exchanging heat to increase efficiency. Replacing pure refrigerants with mixtures calls for more research on the environmental impact as well as the flammability and safety of refrigerant mixtures.

== Organic Rankine cycle ==
In the Organic Rankine Cycle (ORC), zeotropic mixtures are more thermally efficient than pure fluids. Due to their higher boiling points, zeotropic working fluids have higher net outputs of energy at the low temperatures of the Rankine Cycle than pure substances. Zeotropic working fluids condense across a range of temperatures, allowing external heat exchangers to recover the heat of condensation as a heat source for the Rankine Cycle. The changing temperature of the zeotropic working fluid can be matched to that of the fluid being heated or cooled to save waste heat because the mixture's evaporation process occurs at a temperature glide (see pinch analysis).

R21/R245fa and R152a/R245fa are two examples of zeotropic working fluids that can absorb more heat than pure R245fa due to their increased boiling points. The power output increases with the proportion of R152a in R152a/R245fa. R21/R245fa uses less heat and energy than R245fa. Overall, zeotropic mixture R21/R245fa has better thermodynamic properties than pure R245fa and R152a/R245fa as a working fluid in the ORC.

== Cleaning processes ==
Zeotropic mixtures can be used as solvents in cleaning processes in manufacturing. Cleaning processes that use zeotropic mixtures include cosolvent processes and bisolvent processes.

=== Cosolvent and bisolvent processes ===
In a cosolvent system, two miscible fluids with different boiling points are mixed to create a zeotropic mixture. The first fluid is a solvating agent that dissolves soil in the cleaning process. This fluid is an organic solvent with a low-boiling point and a flash point greater than the system's operating temperature. After the solvent mixes with the oil, the second fluid, a hydrofluoroether rinsing agent (HFE), rinses off the solvating agent. The solvating agent can be flammable because its mixture with the HFE is nonflammable. In bisolvent cleaning processes, the rinsing agent is separated from the solvating agent. This makes the solvating and rinsing agents more effective because they are not diluted.

Cosolvent systems are used for heavy oils, waxes, greases and fingerprints, and can remove heavier soils than processes that use pure or azeotropic solvents. Cosolvent systems are flexible in that different proportions of substances in the zeotropic mixture can be used to satisfy different cleaning purposes. For example, increasing the proportion of solvating agent to rinsing agent in the mixture increases the solvency, and thus is used for removing heavier soils.

The operating temperature of the system depends on the boiling point of the mixture, which in turn depends on the compositions of these agents in zeotropic mixture. Since zeotropic mixtures have different boiling points, the cleaning and rinse sump have different ratios of cleaning and solvating agents. The lower-boiling point solvating agent is not found in the rinse sump due to the large difference in boiling points between the agents.

=== Examples of zeotropic solvents ===
Mixtures containing HFC-43-10mee can replace CFC-113 and perfluorocarbon (PFC) as solvents in cleaning systems because HFC-43-10mee does not harm the ozone layer, unlike CFC-113 and PFC. Various mixtures of HFC-43-10mee are commercially available for a variety of cleaning purposes. Examples of zeotropic solvents in cleaning processes include:

- Zeotropic mixtures of HFC-43-10mee and hexamethyldisiloxane can dissolve silicones and are highly compatible with polycarbonates and polyurethane. They can be used to remove silicone lubricant from medical devices.
- Zeotropic mixtures of HFC-43-10mee and isopropanol can remove ions and water from materials without porous surfaces. This zeotropic mixture helps with absorption drying.
- Zeotropic mixtures of HFC-43-10mee, fluorosurfactant, and antistatic additives are energy-efficient and environmentally safe drying fluids that provide spot-free drying.

== See also ==
- List of Refrigerants
- Azeotrope
