= 1,1,1,2-Tetrafluoroethane =

HFC, hydrofluoroalkane refrigerant

Structure
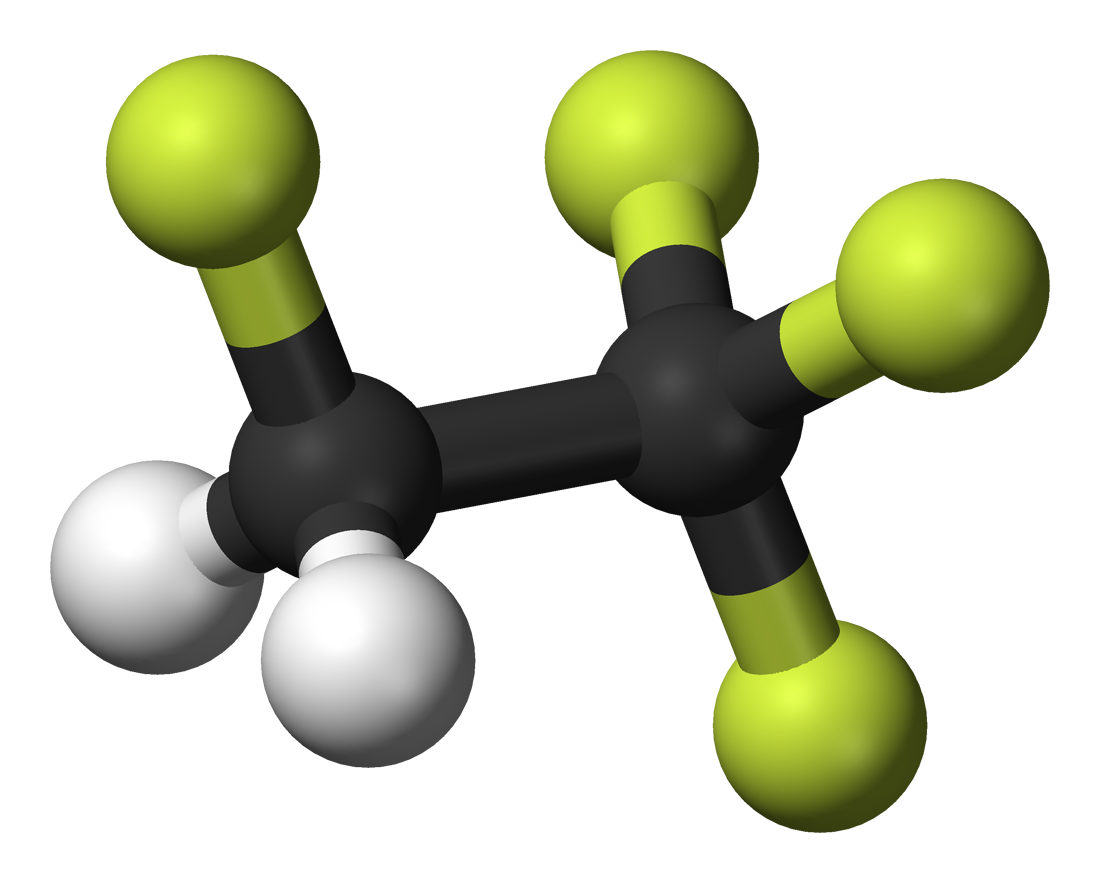
3-D structure

Names
- Preferred IUPAC name 1,1,1,2-Tetrafluoroethane
- Other names HFA-134a; HFC-134a; R-134a; Norflurane

Identifiers
CAS Number	811-97-2
3D model (JSmol)	Interactive image
ChEMBL	ChEMBL2104432
ChemSpider	12577
DrugBank	DB13116
ECHA InfoCard	100.011.252
EC Number	212-377-0
KEGG	D05208
PubChem CID	13129
RTECS number	KI8842500
UNII	DH9E53K1Y8
UN number	3159
CompTox Dashboard (EPA)	DTXSID1021324
- InChI: InChI=1S/C2H2F4/c3-1-2(4,5)6/h1H2 Key: LVGUZGTVOIAKKC-UHFFFAOYSA-N
- SMILES: FCC(F)(F)F

Properties
Chemical formula	C_{2}H_{2}F_{4}
Molar mass	102.032 g·mol^{−1}
Appearance	Colorless gas
Density	0.00425 g/cm^{3}, gas
Melting point	−103.3 °C (−153.9 °F; 169.8 K)
Boiling point	−26.3 °C (−15.3 °F; 246.8 K)
Solubility in water	0.15 wt%

Hazards
- Occupational safety and health (OHS/OSH)
Main hazards	Asphyxiant
- GHS labelling
Pictograms	(GHS04: Compressed Gas)
Signal word	Warning
Hazard statements	H280
Precautionary statements	P410+P403
NFPA 704 (fire diamond)	1 0 1
Flash point	250 °C (482 °F; 523 K)

Related compounds
Related refrigerants	Difluoromethane; Pentafluoroethane
Related compounds	1-Chloro-1,2,2,2-tetrafluoroethane; 1,1,1-Trichloroethane

Supplementary data page
- 1,1,1,2-Tetrafluoroethane (data page)
- Except where otherwise noted, data are given for materials in their standard state (at 25 °C [77 °F], 100 kPa). verify (what is ?) Infobox references

1,1,1,2-Tetrafluoroethane (also known as norflurane (INN), R-134a, Klea 134a, Freon 134a, Forane 134a, Genetron 134a, Green Gas, Florasol 134a, Suva 134a, HFA-134a, or HFC-134a) is a hydrofluorocarbon (HFC) and haloalkane refrigerant with thermodynamic properties similar to R-12 (dichlorodifluoromethane) but with insignificant ozone depletion potential and a lower 100-year global warming potential (1,430, compared to R-12's GWP of 10,900). It has the formula CF_{3}CH_{2}F and a boiling point of −26.3 °C (−15.34 °F) at atmospheric pressure. R-134a cylinders are colored light blue. A phaseout and transition to HFO-1234yf and other refrigerants, with GWPs similar to CO_{2}, began in 2012 within the automotive market.

== Uses ==
1,1,1,2-Tetrafluoroethane is a non-flammable gas used primarily as a "high-temperature" refrigerant for domestic refrigeration and automobile air conditioners. These devices began using 1,1,1,2-tetrafluoroethane in the early 1990s as a replacement for the more environmentally harmful R-12. Retrofit kits are available to convert units that were originally R-12-equipped.

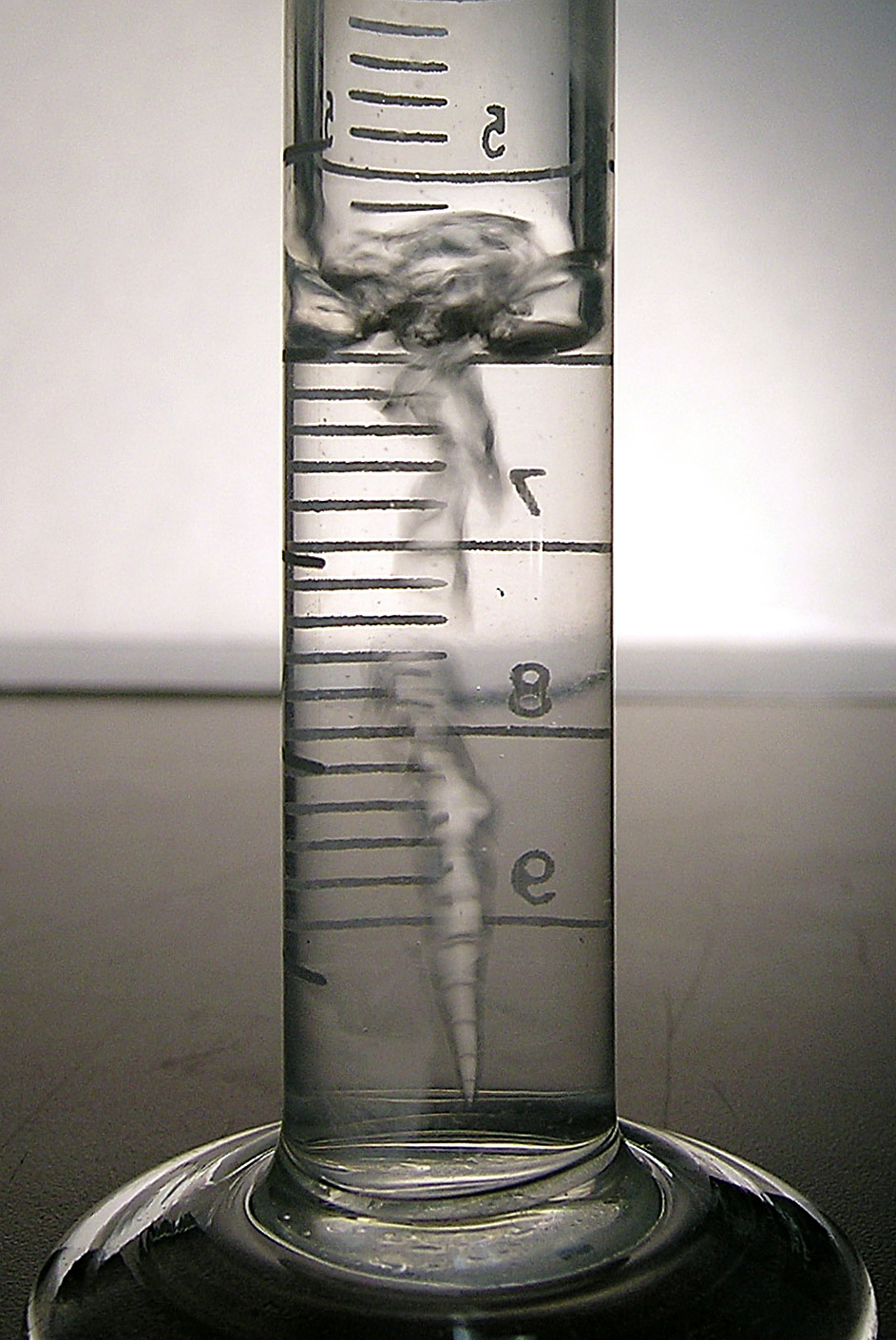
Boiling of Tetrafluoroethane liquid when exposed to normal atmospheric pressure and temperature.

Other common uses include plastic foam blowing, as a cleaning solvent, a propellant for the delivery of pharmaceuticals (e.g., inhaler canisters such as for bronchodilators), wine cork removers, gas dusters ("canned air"), and in air driers for removing the moisture from compressed air. 1,1,1,2-Tetrafluoroethane has also been used to cool computers in some overclocking attempts. It is the refrigerant used in plumbing pipe freeze kits. It is also commonly used as a propellant for airsoft airguns. The gas is often mixed with a silicone-based lubricant.

=== Aspirational and niche applications ===
1,1,1,2-Tetrafluoroethane is also being considered as an organic solvent, both as a liquid and a supercritical fluid.

It is used in the resistive plate chamber particle detectors in the Large Hadron Collider. It is also used for other types of particle detectors, e.g. some cryogenic particle detectors. It can be used as an alternative to sulfur hexafluoride in magnesium smelting as a shielding gas.

== History and environmental impacts ==
1,1,1,2-Tetrafluoroethane was introduced in the early 1990s as a replacement for dichlorodifluoromethane (R-12), which has massive ozone depleting properties. Even though 1,1,1,2-Tetrafluoroethane has insignificant ozone depletion potential (ozone layer) and negligible acidification potential (acid rain), it has a 100-year global warming potential (GWP) of 1430 and an approximate atmospheric lifetime of 14 years. Its concentration in the atmosphere and contribution to radiative forcing have been growing since its introduction. Thus it was included in the IPCC list of greenhouse gases.

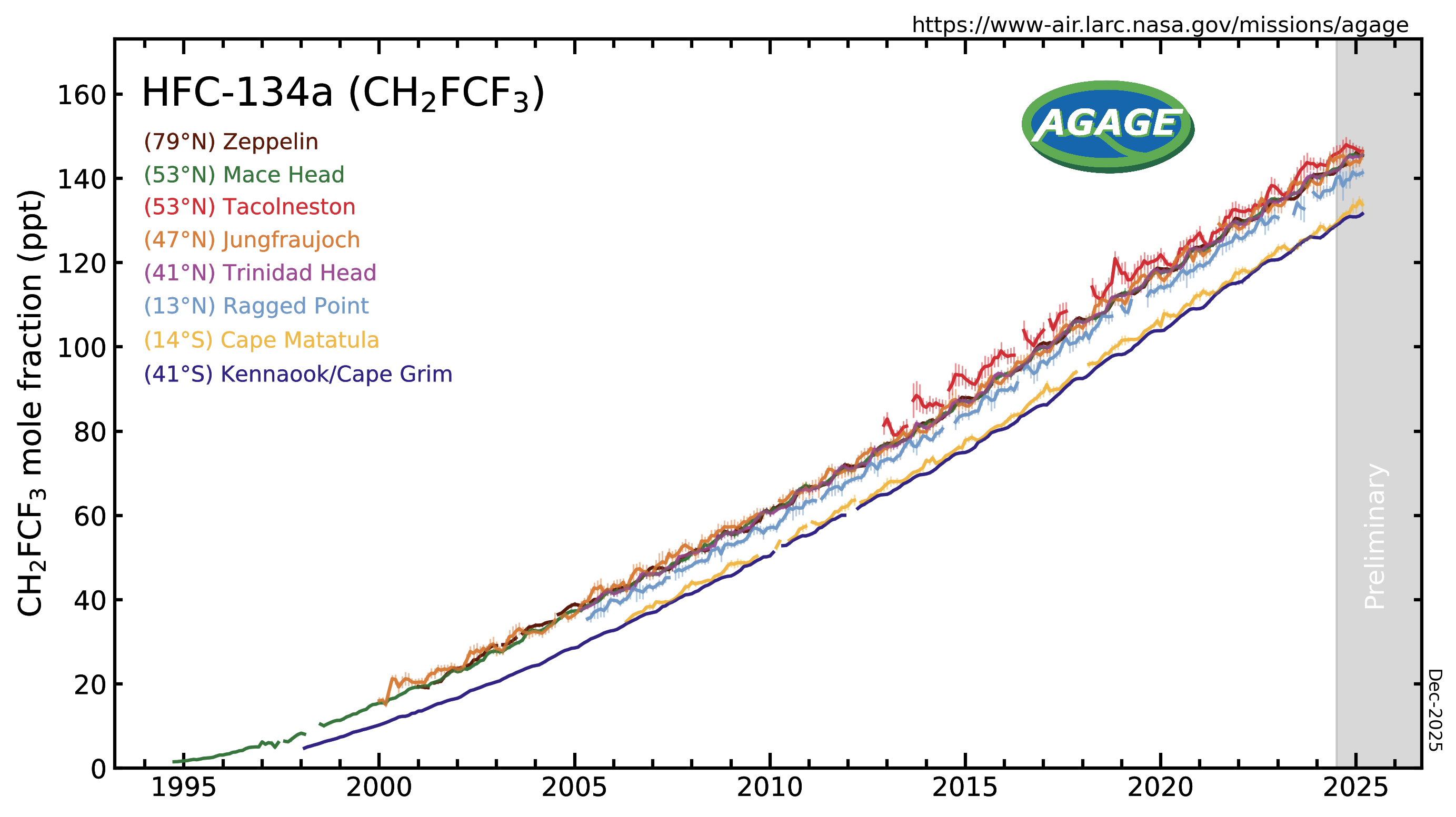
HFC-134a measured by the Advanced Global Atmospheric Gases Experiment (AGAGE) in the lower atmosphere (troposphere) at stations around the world. Abundances are given as pollution free monthly mean mole fractions in parts-per-trillion.

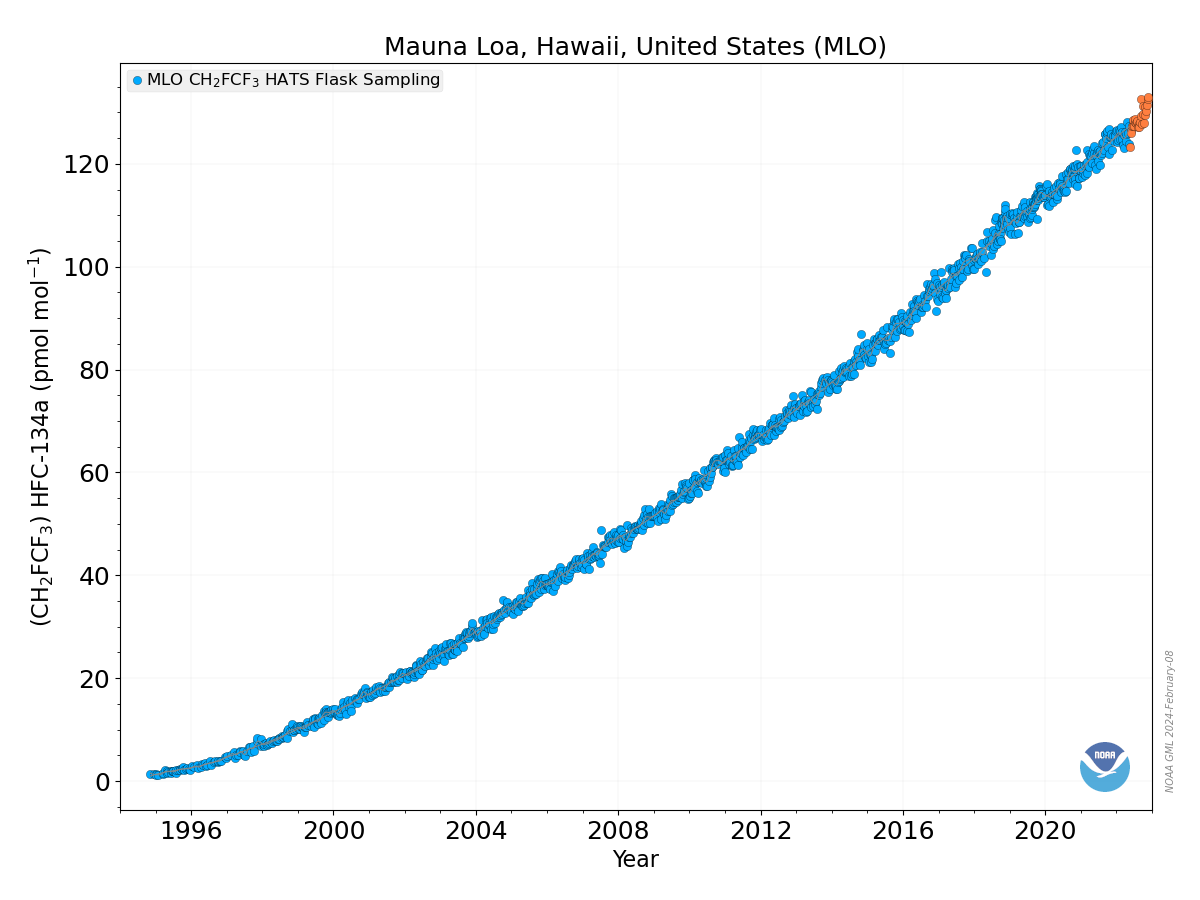
HFC-134a atmospheric concentration since year 1995.

R-134a began being phased out from use in the European Union, starting in the mid 2010s, by a directive of 2006, recommending the replacement of gases in air conditioning systems with a GWP above 100.

1,1,1,2-tetrafluoroethane is subject to use restrictions in the US and other countries as well. The Society of Automotive Engineers (SAE) has proposed that it be best replaced by a new fluorochemical refrigerant HFO-1234yf (CF_{3}CF=CH_{2}) in automobile air-conditioning systems. As of model year 2021, newly manufactured light-duty vehicles in the United States no longer use R-134a.

California may also prohibit the sale of canned R-134a to individuals to avoid non-professional recharge of air conditioners. A ban had been in place in Wisconsin since October 1994 under ATCP 136 prohibiting sales of container sizes holding less than 15 lb (6.8 kilograms) of 1,1,1,2-tetrafluoroethane, but this restriction applied only when the chemical was intended to be a refrigerant. However, the ban was lifted in Wisconsin in 2012. During the time that it was active, this Wisconsin-specific ban contained loopholes. For example, it was legal for a person to purchase gas duster containers with any amount of the chemical because in that instance the chemical is neither intended to be a refrigerant nor is HFC-134a included in the § 7671a listing of class I and class II substances.

== Production and reactions ==
Tetrafluoroethane is typically made by reacting trichloroethylene with hydrogen fluoride:

CHCl=CCl_{2} + 4 HF → CF_{3}CH_{2}F + 3 HCl

It reacts with butyllithium to give trifluorovinyl lithium:

CF_{3}CH_{2}F + 2 BuLi → CF_{2}=CFLi + LiF + 2 BuH

== Safety ==
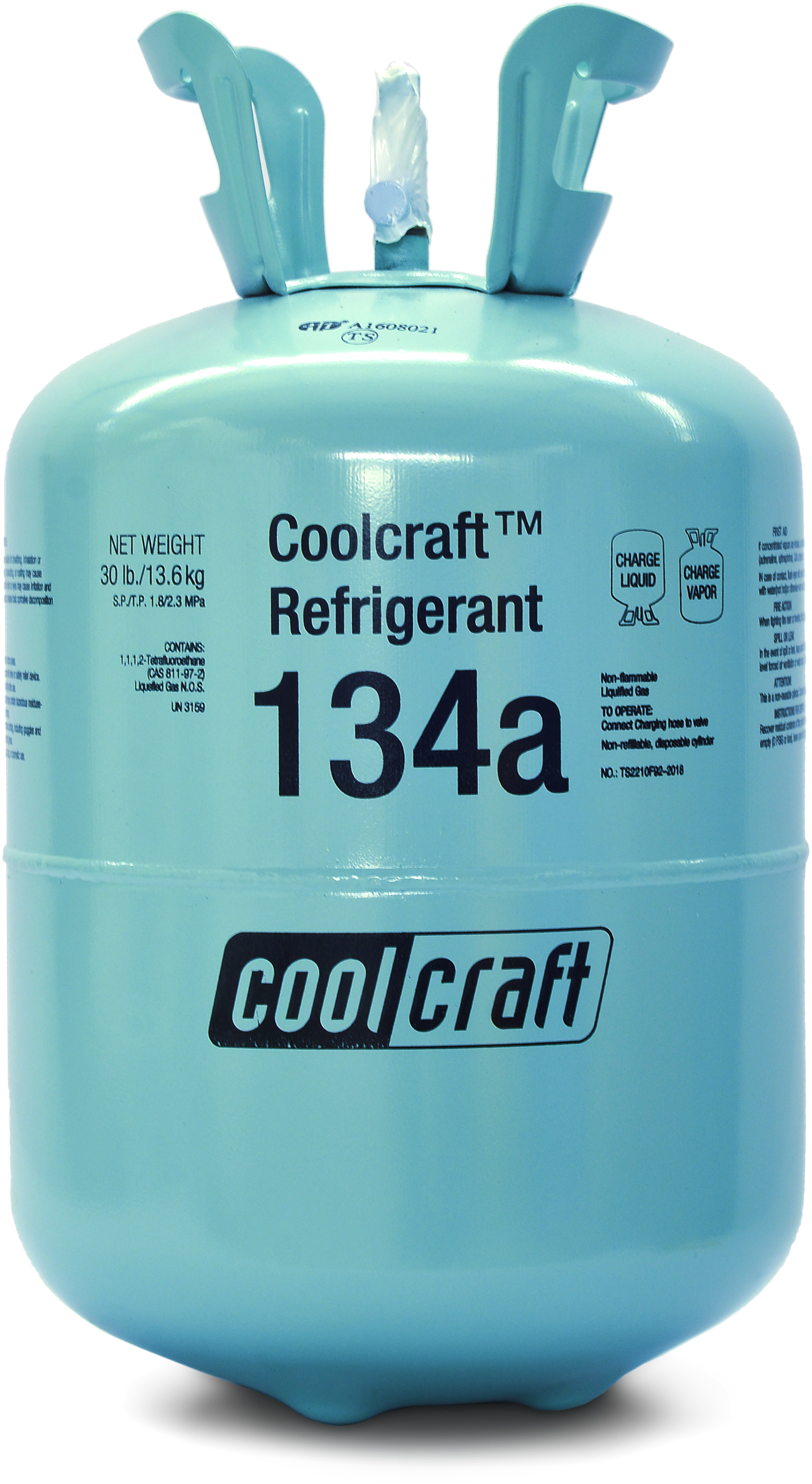
R-134a cylinder

Mixtures with air of the gas 1,1,1,2-tetrafluoroethane are not flammable at atmospheric pressure and temperatures up to 100 °C (212 °F). However, mixtures with high concentrations of air at elevated pressure and/or temperature can be ignited. Contact of 1,1,1,2-tetrafluoroethane with flames or hot surfaces in excess of 250 °C (482 °F) may cause vapor decomposition and the emission of toxic gases including hydrogen fluoride and carbonyl fluoride, however the decomposition temperature has been reported as above 370 °C. 1,1,1,2-Tetrafluoroethane itself has an LD_{50} of 1,500 g/m^{3} in rats, making it relatively non-toxic, apart from the dangers inherent to inhalant abuse. Its gaseous form will displace air in the lungs. This can result in asphyxiation if excessively inhaled. This contributes to most deaths by inhalant abuse.

Aerosol cans containing 1,1,1,2-tetrafluoroethane, when inverted, become effective freeze sprays. Under pressure, 1,1,1,2-tetrafluoroethane is compressed into a liquid, which upon vaporization absorbs a significant amount of thermal energy. As a result, it will greatly lower the temperature of any object it contacts as it evaporates.

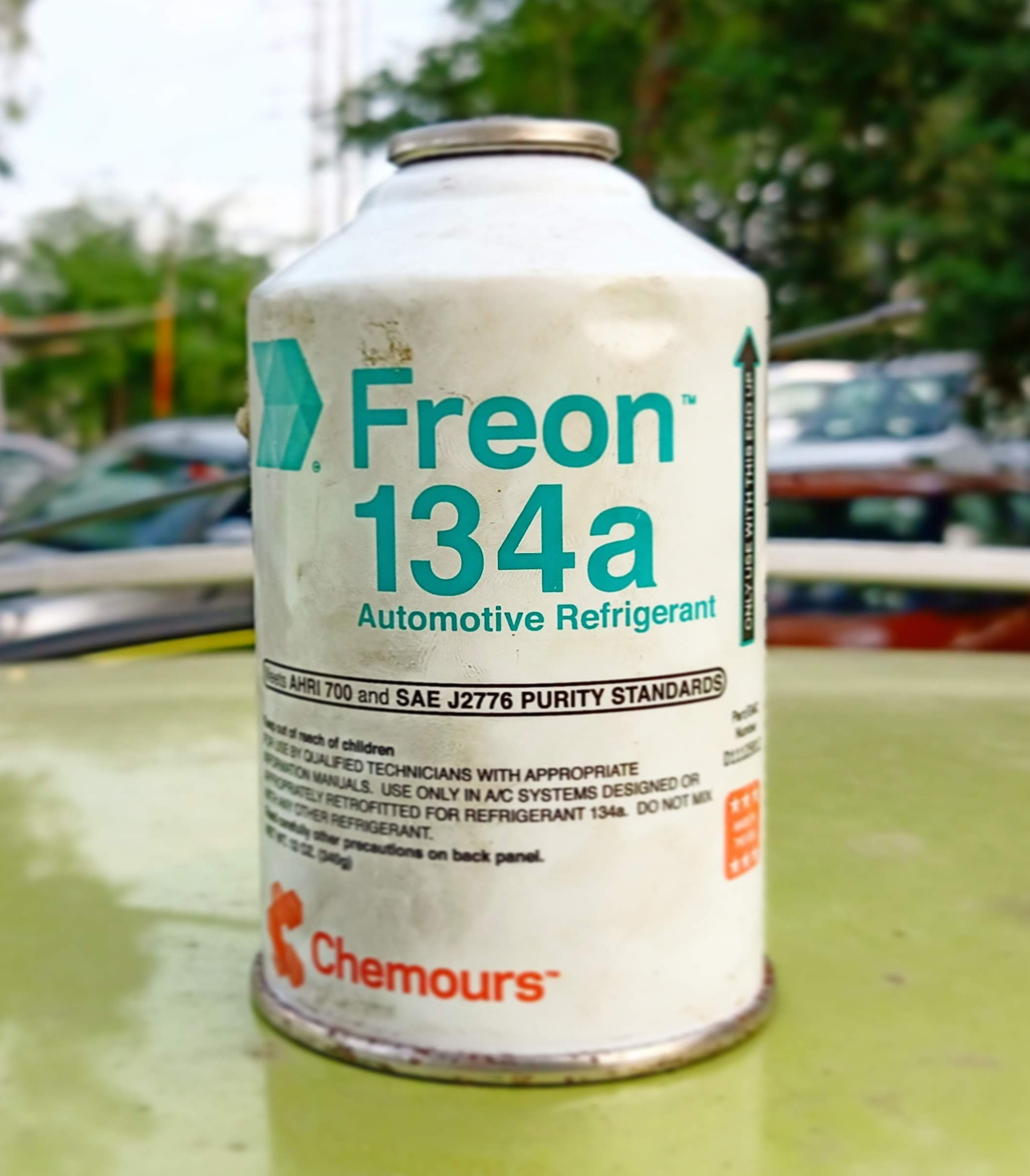
Freon 134a refrigerant for car AC

== Medical use ==
For its medical uses, 1,1,1,2-tetrafluoroethane has the generic name norflurane. It is used as propellant for some metered dose inhalers. It is considered safe for this use. In combination with pentafluoropropane, it is used as a topical vapocoolant spray for numbing boils before curettage. It has also been studied as a potential inhalational anesthetic, but it is nonanaesthetic at doses used in inhalers.

== See also ==
- List of refrigerants
- Tetrabromoethane
- Tetrachloroethane
- Inhalant
