= Automotive air conditioning =

System to cool the air in a vehicle

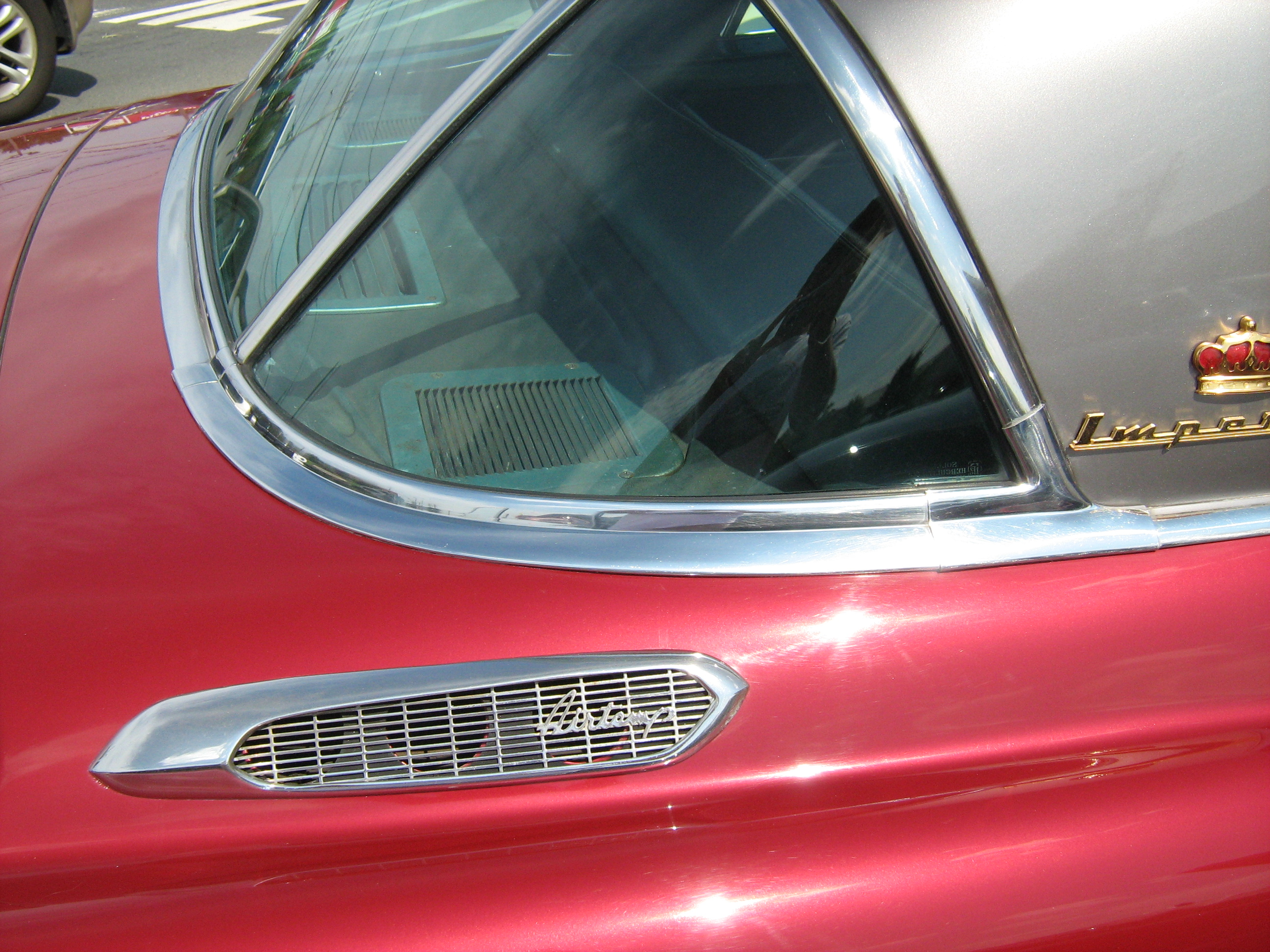
1953 Chrysler Imperial with factory trunk mounted "Airtemp" system

Automotive air conditioning systems use air conditioning to cool the air in a vehicle.

Automotive air conditioning creates for the vehicle operator a comfortable cabin environment, while also contributing to improved car interior air quality by providing the first line of protection against potentially harmful airborne contaminants: dust, and aerosols by maintaining positive cabin pressure along with selecting the proper (HEPA, activated carbon, anti-microbial, etc.) fresh air filter for the application.

== History ==
A company in New York City in the United States first offered the installation of air conditioning for cars in 1933. Most of their customers operated limousines and luxury cars.

On 7 October 1935, Ralph Peo of Houde Engineering, Buffalo, New York, applied for a patent for an "Air Cooling Unit for Automobiles". U.S. patent 2,099,227, was granted on 16 November 1937.

In 1939, Packard became the first automobile manufacturer to offer an optional air conditioning unit in its 1940 model year cars. These bulky units were manufactured by Bishop and Babcock (B&B), of Cleveland, Ohio and were ordered on approximately 2,000 cars. The "Bishop and Babcock Weather Conditioner" also incorporated a heater. Cars ordered with this option were shipped from Packard's East Grand Boulevard facility to the B&B factory where the installation was performed. Once complete, the car was shipped to a local dealer for delivery to customers.

Packard warranted and supported this conversion. However, it was not commercially successful because:

- The main evaporator and blower system took up half of the trunk space (though this became less of a problem as trunks became larger in the post-war period).
- It was superseded by more efficient systems in the post-war years.
- It had no temperature thermostat or shut-off mechanism other than switching the blower off. (Cold air would still sometimes enter the car with any movement as the drive belt was continuously connected to the compressor—later systems would use electrically operated clutches to avoid this)
- The several feet of plumbing going back and forth between the engine compartment and trunk proved unreliable in service.
- The price, at $274 (US$6,342 in 2025 dollars), was unaffordable to most people in depression/pre-war America.

The option was discontinued after 1941.

=== Chrysler Airtemp ===
The 1953 Chrysler Imperial was one of the first production cars in twelve years to offer modern automobile air conditioning as an option, following tentative experiments by Packard in 1940 and Cadillac in 1941. Walter Chrysler had seen to the invention of Airtemp air conditioning in the 1930s for the Chrysler Building, and had offered it on cars in 1941-42, and again in 1951-52.

The Airtemp was more advanced than rival automobile air conditioners by 1953. It was operated by a single switch on the dashboard marked with low, medium, and high positions. As the highest capacity unit available at that time, the system was capable of quickly cooling the passenger compartment and also reducing humidity, dust, pollen, and tobacco smoke. The system drew in more outside air than contemporary systems; thus, reducing the staleness associated with automotive air conditioning at the time. Instead of plastic tubes mounted on the rear window package shelf as on GM cars, small ducts directed cool air toward the ceiling of the car where it filtered down around the passengers instead of blowing directly on them, a feature that modern cars have lost.

Cadillac, Buick, and Oldsmobile added air conditioning as an option on some of their models for the 1953 model year. All of these Frigidaire systems used separate engine and trunk mounted components.

=== Nash integrated system ===
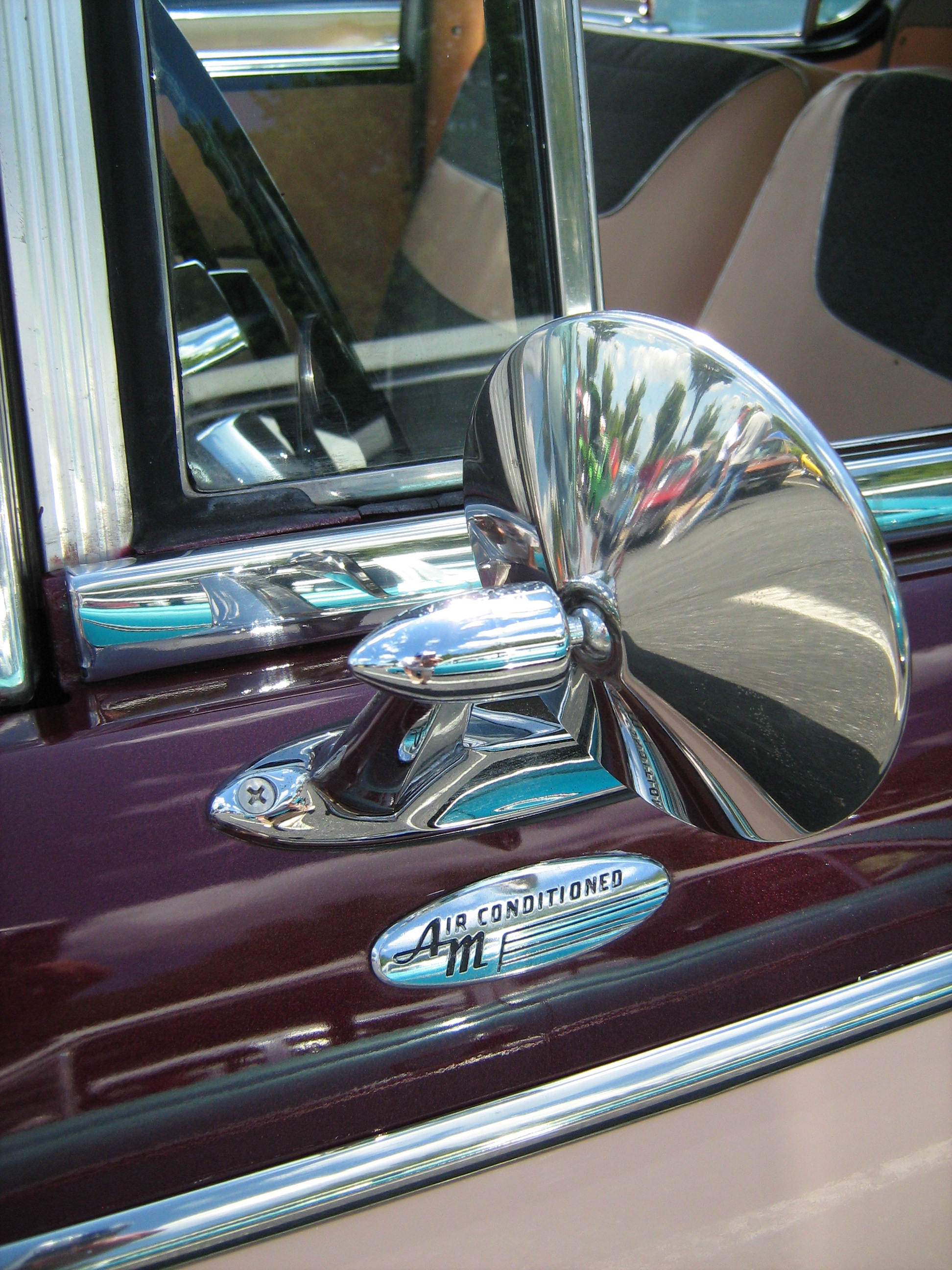
Logo on a 1957 car with AMC factory-installed air-conditioning system

In 1954, the Nash Ambassador was the first American automobile to have a front-end, fully integrated heating, ventilating, and air-conditioning system. The Nash-Kelvinator corporation used its experience in refrigeration to introduce the automobile industry's first compact and affordable, single-unit heating and air conditioning system optional for its Nash models. This was the first mass market system with controls on the dash and an electric clutch. This system was also compact and serviceable with all of its components installed under the hood or in the cowl area.

Combining heating, cooling, and ventilating, the new air conditioning system for the Nash cars was called the "All-Weather Eye". This followed the marketing name of "Weather Eye" for Nash's fresh-air automotive heating and ventilating system that was first used in 1938. With a single thermostatic control, the Nash passenger compartment air cooling option was "a good and remarkably inexpensive" system. The system had cold air for passengers enter through dash-mounted vents. Nash's exclusive "remarkable advance" was not only the "sophisticated" unified system, but also its $345 price that beat all other systems.

Most competing systems used a separate heating system and an engine-mounted compressor, driven by the engine crankshaft via a belt, with an evaporator in the car's trunk to deliver cold air through the rear parcel shelf and overhead vents. General Motors offered a front-mounted air conditioning system made by its Harrison Division on 1954 Pontiacs with a straight-eight engine. It was very expensive and not a fully integrated system with separate controls and ducts for air distribution. The heater core continued to be a separate "Venti-Seat" or under the front seat system with its own controls. The unified alternative layout pioneered by Nash "became established practice and continues to form the basis of the modern and more sophisticated automatic climate control systems."

=== Growth in application ===
The innovation was adopted quickly and by 1960 about 20% of all cars in the U.S. had air-conditioning, with the percentage increasing to 80% in the warm areas of the Southwest.

Cadillac introduced the industry's first Comfort Control which was a completely automatic heating and cooling system set by dial thermostat for the 1964 model year.

American Motors Corporation (AMC) made air conditioning standard equipment on all AMC Ambassadors starting with the 1968 model year, an innovation in the mass market with the base prices of the cars starting at $2,671. At the time, air conditioning was standard only on Cadillac limousines and Rolls-Royces.

By 1969, 54% of domestic automobiles were equipped with air conditioning, a feature needed not only for passenger comfort, but also to increase the car's resale value.

Air-conditioning for automobiles came into widespread use in the United States starting from the 1980s. Adoption was slower elsewhere; in 1990 less than eight percent of cars sold in Europe were thus equipped.

=== Evaporative cooling ===
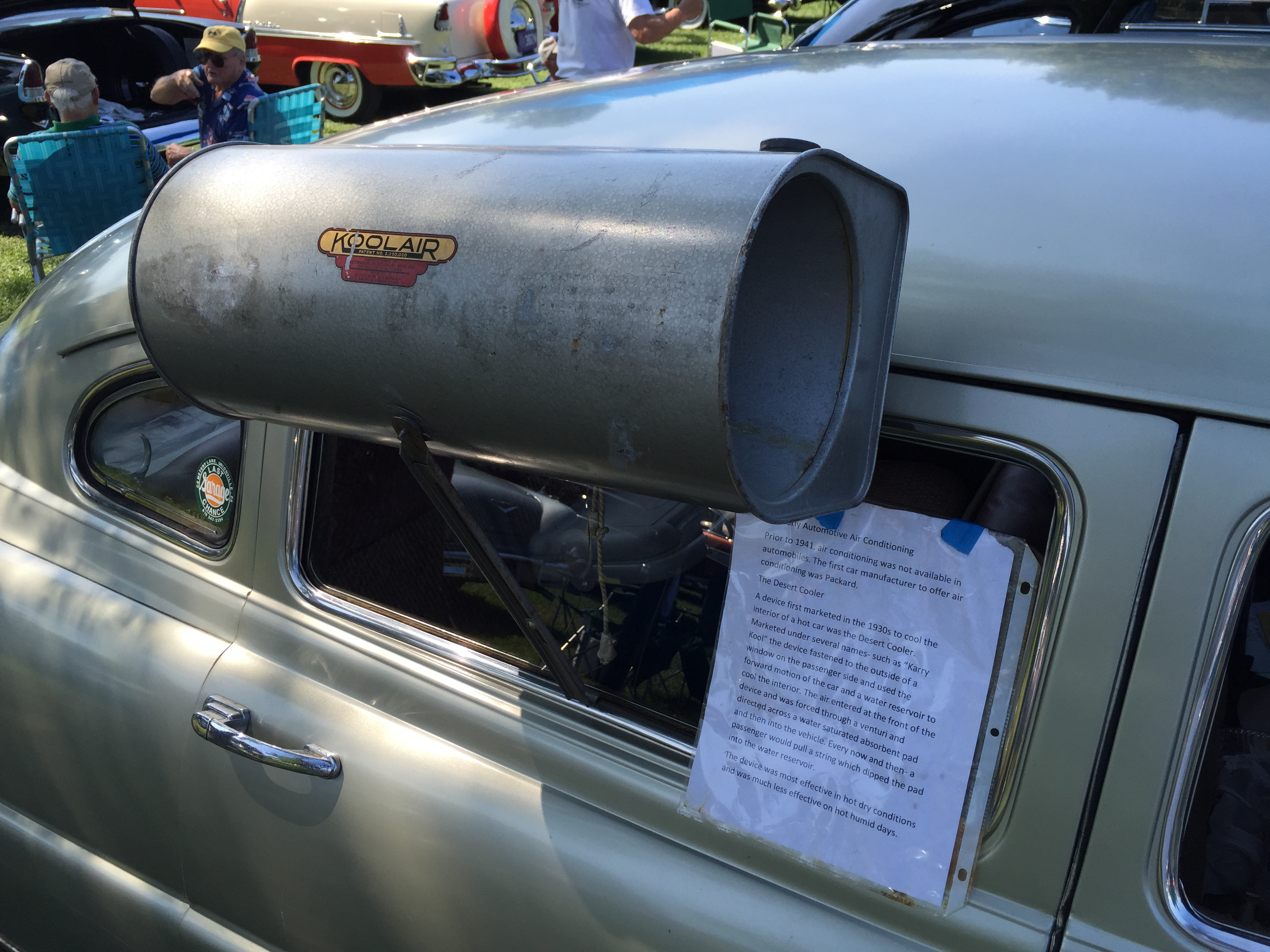
A car cooler

A car cooler is an automobile evaporative cooler, sometimes referred to as a swamp cooler. Most are aftermarket relatively inexpensive accessories consisting of an external window-mounted metal cylinder without moving parts, but internal under the dashboard or center floor units with an electric fan are available. It was an early type of automobile air conditioner and is not used in modern cars relying on refrigerative systems to cool the interior.

To cool the air it used latent heat (in other words, cooling by water evaporation). Water inside the device evaporates and in the process transfers heat from the surrounding air. The cool moisture-laden air is then directed to the inside of the car. The evaporate "cooling" effect decreases with humidity because the air is already saturated with water. Therefore, the lower the humidity, such as in dry desert regions, the better the system works. Car coolers were popular, especially among summer tourists visiting or crossing the southwestern United States states of California, Arizona, Texas, New Mexico, and Nevada.

== Major Components ==
Automotive air conditioning systems may be packaged or spread through the vehicle consisting of the following major components:

- Compressor
- Condenser
- TXV
- Evaporator (typically installed in a shrouded module)
- Air filters (fresh and re-circulation)
- Air balance damper
- Fans (blower motor(typically shrouded) and condenser)
- Grilles/Registers
- Duct
- Associated
  - Piping
  - Hosing
  - Fitings
  - Mounting hardware
  - Mounting housings

== Operating principles ==
A simple stylized diagram of the refrigeration cycle: 1) condensing coil, 2) expansion valve, 3) evaporator coil, 4) compressor

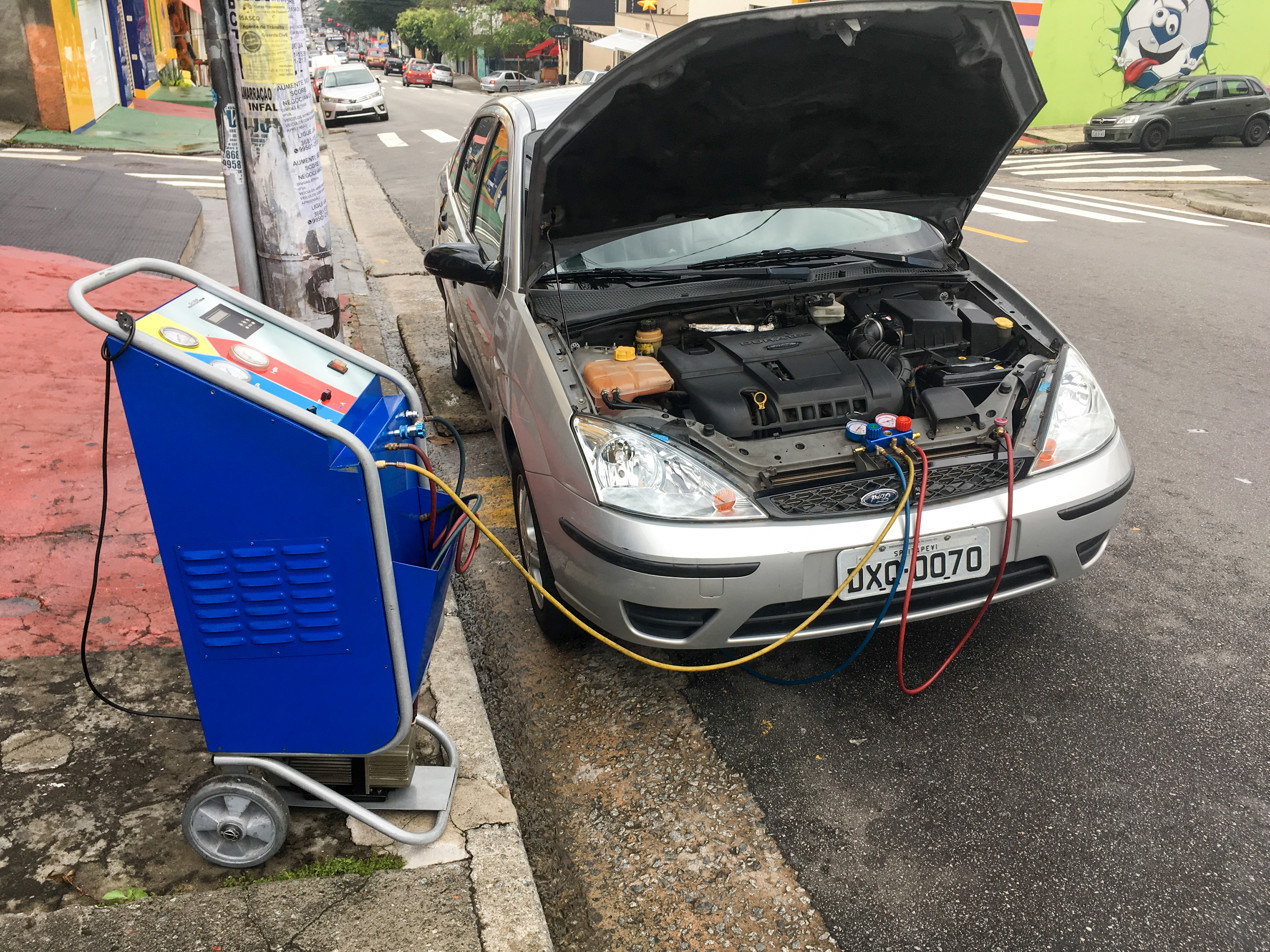
Regassing the air conditioning of a Ford Focus

In the refrigeration cycle, heat is transported from the cabin to the environment similar to a refrigerator that transports heat from the interior and into the ambient environment.

Circulating refrigerant gas vapor (which also carries the compressor lubricant oil across the entire system along with it) from the evaporator enters the gas compressor typically in the engine bay, usually using an axial piston pump compressor, that compresses the refrigerant gas vapor to a higher pressure, resulting in a higher temperature as well. The hot, compressed refrigerant vapor is now at a temperature and pressure at which it can be condensed and is routed through a condenser, usually in front of the car's radiator to be the first heat rejection component and to take advantage of the car’s velocities when traveling. Here the refrigerant is cooled by air flowing across the surface area of the condenser (originating from the vehicle's movement or from a fan, often the same fan that cools the radiator if the condenser is mounted on it, automatically turned on when the vehicle is stationary or moving at low speeds) and condensed into a liquid. Thus, the circulating refrigerant ejects heat from the cab interior and the heat is carried away into the environment by the air flowing across the condenser.

In a thermal expansion valve air conditioning system, the condensed and pressurized liquid refrigerant is next routed through the receiver-drier, that is, a one-way desiccant and filter cartridge that both dehydrates the refrigerant and compressor lubricant oil mixture to remove any residual water content (which would become ice inside the expansion valve and therefore clog it) that the vacuum done before the charging process did not manage to remove from the system, and filters it to remove any solid particles carried by the mixture, in addition to acting as a storage vessel for any excess liquid refrigerant during low cooling demand periods, and then through the thermal expansion valve where it undergoes an abrupt reduction in pressure. That pressure reduction results in flash evaporation of a part of the liquid refrigerant, lowering its temperature. The cold refrigerant is then routed through the evaporator coil in the passenger compartment.

When the expansion device is a simple fixed metering orifice, known as an orifice tube, the receiver-drier is instead located between the evaporator outlet and the compressor, and in this case, it is known as an accumulator. In such an air conditioning system, the accumulator also prevents the liquid refrigerant from reaching the compressor during low cooling demand periods.

The air, often after being filtered by a cabin air filter, is blown by an adjustable speed electric powered centrifugal fan across the evaporator, causing the liquid part of the cold refrigerant mixture to evaporate as well, further lowering the temperature. The warm air is therefore cooled, and also deprived of any humidity (which condenses on the evaporator coils and is drained outside of the vehicle) in the process. It is then passed through a heater matrix, inside of which the engine's coolant circulates, where it can be reheated to a certain degree or even a certain temperature selected by the user and then delivered inside the vehicle's cabin through a set of adjustable vents. Another way of adjusting the desired air temperature, this time by working on the system's cooling capacity, is precisely regulating the centrifugal fan speed so that only the strictly required volumetric flow rate of air is cooled by the evaporator. The user is also given the option to close the vehicle's external air flaps, to achieve even faster and stronger cooling by recirculating the already-cooled air inside the cabin to the evaporator. Finally, whenever the compressor can be commanded to operate in a reduced displacement, the vent temperature can also be controlled by acting upon the compressor's displacement.

Evaporator freeze over, which stops air from flowing through the evaporator fins, can be prevented in different ways. A temperature switch or a thermistor can control the evaporator coil surface temperature, and a pressure switch or sensing element can monitor the suction pressure (which is in relationship with the refrigerant's evaporating temperature). Both control means can act (either directly or by means of a control unit fed by their data) upon the compressor's clutch engagement status or, in the case of a variable displacement compressor, its displacement; additionally, a secondary valve located on the suction side can throttle the refrigerant flow so that the evaporator's outlet pressure doesn't fall below a precise value during system operation.

To complete the refrigeration cycle, the refrigerant vapor is routed back into the compressor.

The warmer the air that reaches the evaporator, the higher the pressure of the vapor mixture discharged from it and therefore the higher the load placed on the compressor and therefore on the engine to keep the refrigerant flowing through the system. Compressor load is also proportional to the condensing temperature.

The automotive ac compressor can be driven by the car's engine (e.g. via a belt, often the serpentine belt, and an electromagnetically actuated clutch; an electronically actuated variable displacement compressor can also be always directly driven by a belt without the need of any clutch and magnet at all) or by an electric motor. Engine mounted compressors fall under two types:

1. Pad mount, statically mounted with no adjustment to belt tension and requires automatic engine belt tensioner to avoid power losses
2. Bracket mount, fully adjustable belt tension periodic belt tension maintenance to avoid power losses

There are different methods for the repair and maintenance of the tube connections ensuring the refrigeration cycle. Conventional methods like soldering or welding lead to time and damaging soiling issues. The Lokring connection which is based on compressed fittings is easy to use and thus more time-efficient.

== Automotive air conditioning refrigerants ==
=== R-12 ===
R-12, the first automotive air conditioning refrigerant, was invented in 1928 by a team of scientists put together by Thomas Midgley, Jr. whom set out to systematically study refrigerants, leading to the discovery of chlorofluorocarbons (CFCs) and hydrochlorofluorocarbons (HCFCs) refrigerant compounds. From these two compounds, two refrigerants were isolated for widespread use, R-12 and R-22. Beginning in 1931 and for over 50 years, both of these refrigerants could commonly be found in households and businesses. R-12 was also used in automotive air conditioning systems because it was the first safe non-flammable refrigerant. This refrigerant was the industry standard until the 1970s when scientists discovered that R-12 contained chlorine which depleted the ozone layer in the earth’s atmosphere. When R-12 was released from either a leak in systems or improperly disposing of contaminated freon, the gaseous freon would go up into the atmosphere. Chlorine molecules from the refrigerant would break up ozone molecules in the atmosphere, which produced holes in the ozone, that in turn contributed to the destruction of the ozone layer. R-12 continued to be used until a new refrigerant could be invented that had fewer negative effects. R-12 was used in automotive air conditioning systems until the mid-90s when production was banned by the government and replaced with a new refrigerant, R-134a. R-12 can still be bought and sold but is no longer produced. This makes R-12 very expensive and hard to find. R-12’s global warming potential number is very large at about 11,000.

=== R-134a ===
The second generation automotive air conditioning refrigerant discovered was R-134a. R-134a is a hydrofluorocarbon refrigerant that contains fluorine and hydrogen. The successor to R-12, R-134a contains no chlorine that could deplete the ozone layer. R-134a is a greenhouse gas with a lower global warming potential than R-12. New cars produced in the early 1990s contained the new refrigerant in their air conditioning systems. Owners of older cars with R-12 systems would either have to invest in an R-12 to R-134a conversion system, buy a new car, or find a qualified technician to recharge their older R-12 system. Since 1990, R-134a has been used in cars for over 30 years. R-134a’s global warming potential number is about 1,430.

=== R-1234yf ===
The third generation and newest widely used automotive air conditioning refrigerant is R-1234yf or a blend thereof primarily consisting such. R-1234yf is a hydrofluoroolefin refrigerant that contains hydrogen, fluorine, carbon elements and no chlorine that could deplete the ozone layer. The refrigerant was developed by the DuPont/Honeywell company and as of 2026 is more expensive per pound than R-134a. However, costs are expected to decline as production volumes ramp up and R-134a supply declines. Owners of older cars with R-134a systems would either have to invest in an R-134a to R-1234yf conversion system, buy a new car, or find a qualified technician to recharge their older R-134a system. New cars produced in the mid 2010's began using the new refrigerant in their air conditioning system and is currently the most widespread automotive air conditioning refrigerant. R-1234yf is not directly cross-compatible with older R-134a or R-12 systems due to the up to 25% reduction in performance when using like-to-like R-134a AC system component sizes, incompatibility with compressor oils, and evaporator certification to SAE J2842. Of the three refrigerants listed above, R-1234yf is the best for the environment with the lowest global warming potential number which is about 4.

== Maintenance, hygiene & cleaning ==
=== Refrigerant Maintenance ===
Air conditioning systems in cars require special maintenance. Normally the lifetime losses of refrigerant are small and have no effect. But the system should be checked for any loss in a two to four year circle; at least, when the cooling capacity decreases.

=== Hygiene control ===
Biogrowth in air conditioning systems can be reduced for a limited time only. Hygiene measures should be applied regularly. The Standard 6032 of the Association of German Engineers (VDI) provides an overview of the hygienic maintenance of vehicle air conditioning systems according to the state of the art. A regular, professional hygiene check of a vehicle's air conditioning system includes checking the drain lines for the condensation water, annual cleaning of the air conditioning system evaporator and changing the interior air filter (pollen filter). In particular, the unhindered drainage of the condensation water from the air conditioning system evaporator must be ensured, otherwise the moisture will remain within the system and uncontrolled nests for biological colonization will arise.

Due to the physical framework conditions, the forced separation of condensed water, air conditioning evaporators in motor vehicles have a very important health and hygiene function. Regular cleaning of the air conditioning evaporator must therefore ensure that the biological colonization of the surface is interrupted and that the sometimes toxic decay products of bacteria (endotoxins) or metabolites of mold (mycotoxins) are safely removed from the lamella system.

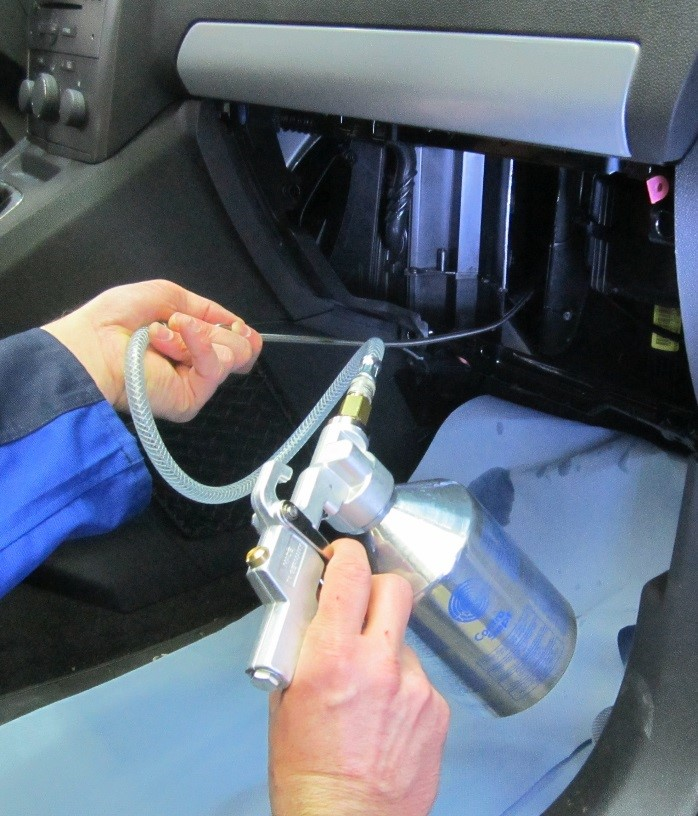
Vehicle A/C cleaning

=== Hygienic air conditioning cleaning ===
The necessity of hygienic cleaning of ventilation systems in vehicles at regular intervals is not only logically understandable, but is also described by the technical guideline and standard VDI 6032 of the Association of German Engineers. Particles such as Dust, (animal) hair and/or fungal growth, dander, etc. and remain on the pollen filter shaft and the surrounding walls. The air conditioner quickly becomes a dirt and germ spinner. Merely replacing the air filter of an HVAC system as part of the inspection is not enough. The pollen filter box must be cleaned professionally and the air conditioning system evaporator must be flushed hygienically and effectively with cleaners without fragrances (allergy triggers) every 24 months at the latest. With a professional air conditioning system cleaning according to the current state of the art, mould, germs, bacteria and other odor-forming substances or deposits are literally washed away at the point of origin. This is the only way to ensure the required indoor air hygiene in the vehicle. The choice of approved cleaning agents and methods is also crucial here. These were also clearly described by the VDI in the 6032 standard for cleaning air conditioning systems. With this method, the air conditioning evaporator is completely flushed with a cleaning liquid introduced through a probe. The evaporator is then as clean as a new component and completely free of deposits or substances that form a culture medium. Only the combination of mechanical cleaning and a cleaning agent ensures working results. Meanwhile, both the driver and all passengers are exposed to an invisible health risk. "In order to achieve a supply air quality that is conducive to health, the AC system must be .. professionally .. cleaned at regular intervals.“

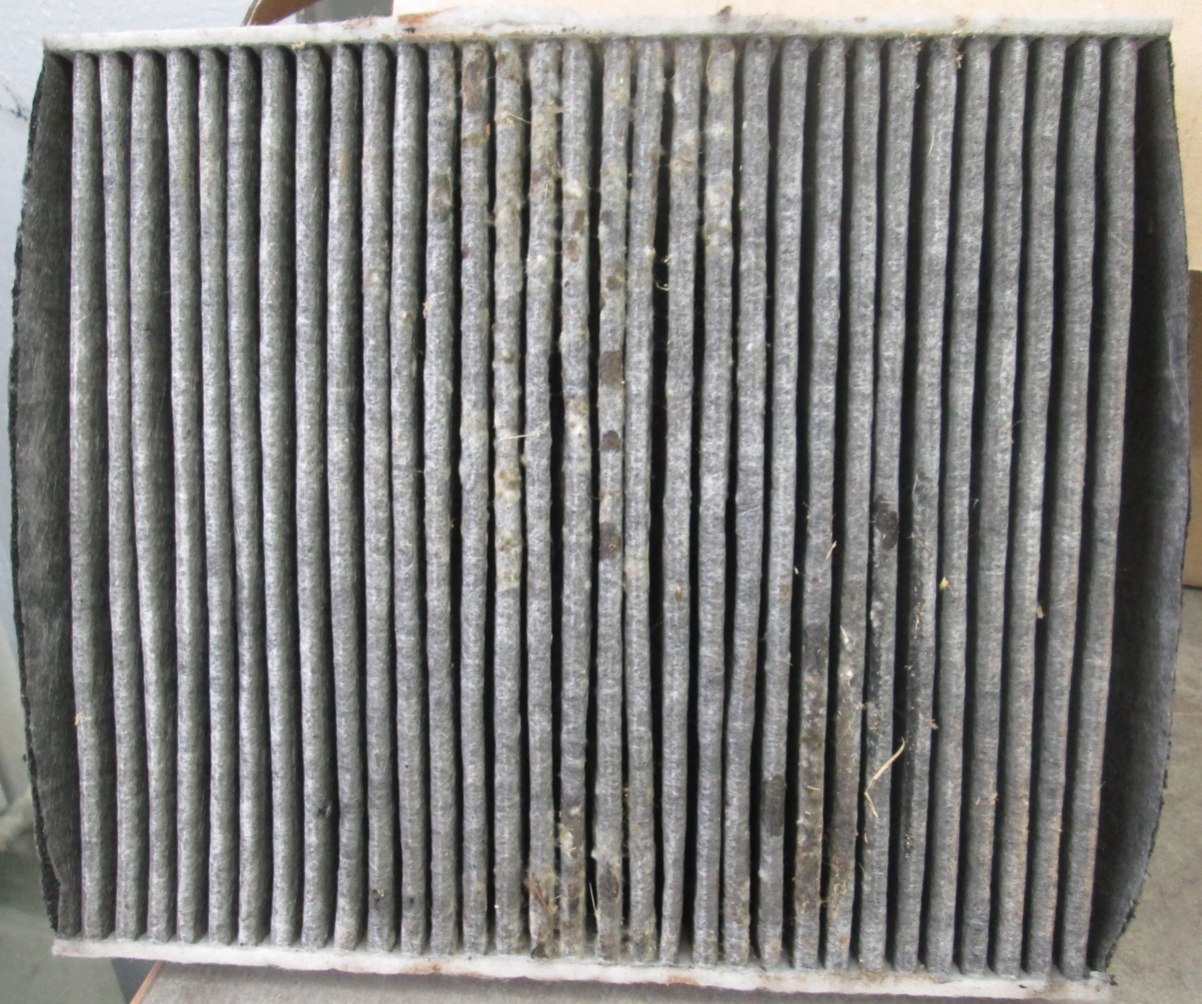
Very late air filter replacement with biogrowth

=== Challenges for air filters ===
Air filters that are not replaced regularly (once or twice a year) often look as shown and are a source of germs, especially for mould. Pollen decompose in the filter within 12 weeks. This decomposition process releases its actual allergen. These have a particle size that cannot be retained by the pollen filter. The air flow through the pollen filter leads to an increasingly poor air quality inside the vehicle. Especially in overloaded filters that have been used for a long time, particle sizes develop that are below the filter performance. The particles of microorganisms, pollen, germs and bacteria are released directly to the moist surface environment of the air conditioning system evaporator via the clean air side of the filter. Therefore, the air conditioning evaporator should also be professionally cleaned once a year.

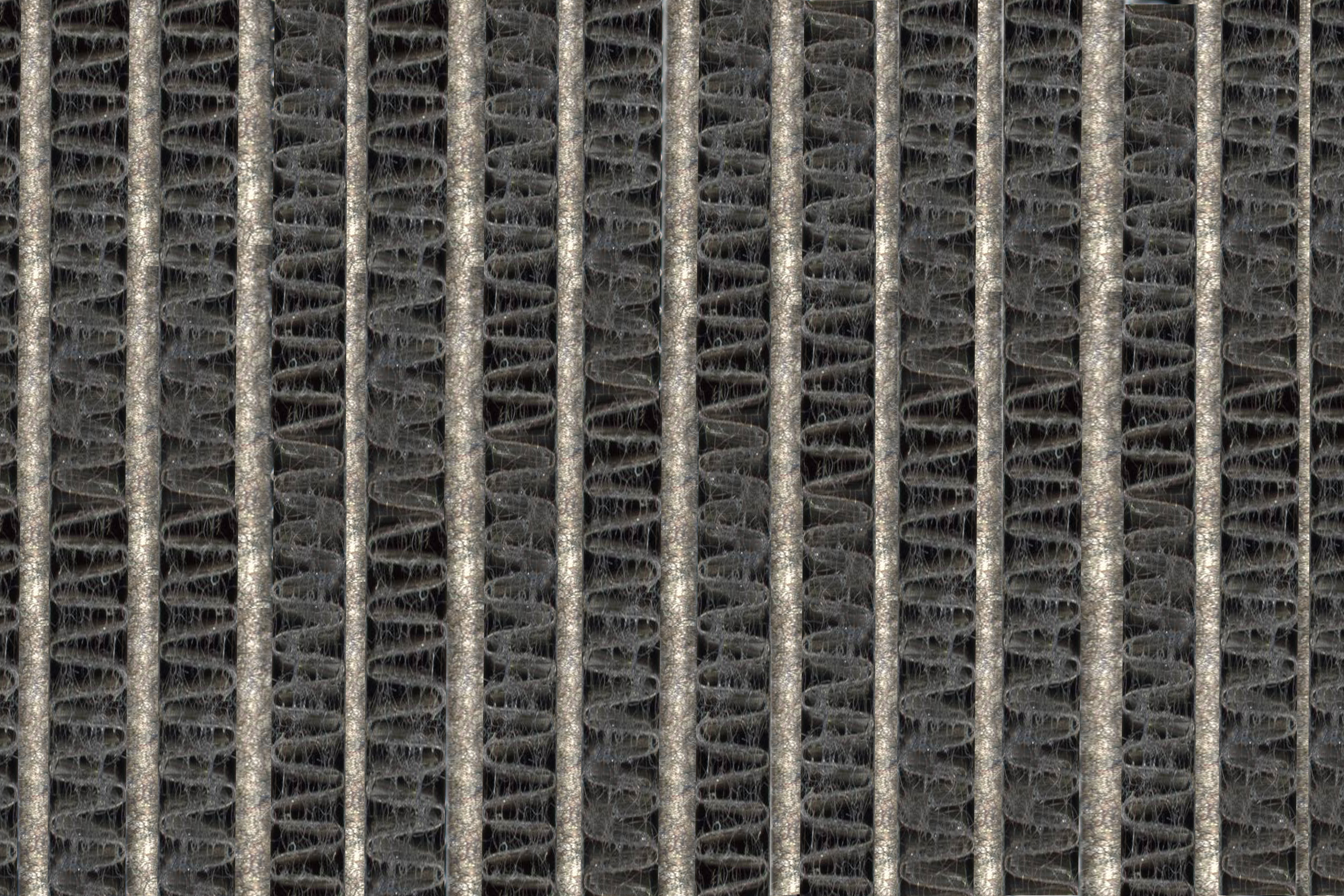
Uncleaned air conditioner evaporator with biogrowth

=== Challenges for air conditioning evaporators ===
The same applies to an air conditioning evaporator that is not professionally cleaned regularly. Bacteria also settle on its surface and lead to an ever increasing biogrowth due to the continuous moisture of the component. Hygienic problems also arise if the evaporator is cleaned incorrectly or treated with unsuitable cleaning agents. Cleaning agents that are too harsh destroy or damage the protective coating of the fin evaporator structure. This can change the drip angle of the condensate and increases the discharge volume on the evaporator. The result is misdirected, bacterially contaminated condensate that accumulates in unexpected places within the air conditioning system.

The vehicle owner must personally ensure that the workshop carries out a hygienic cleaning of the air conditioning system using a chemical-mechanical process recommended by the VDI as part of the inspection or an upcoming air filter change. Since the method described has not yet become established in everyday workshop practice, the use of so-called "one click cans" is currently enjoying great popularity. Not only because they are printed with the addition "air conditioning cleaner". Most of the contents of these cans are randomly distributed in the vehicle and settle there. The part that could actually be sucked in by the ventilation system via the circulating air ends up on the cabin air filter. Nothing gets on the vaporizer with this method. Only scents and aromas are distributed in the vehicle with the click cans. Only the combination of mechanical pressure flushing and a suitable cleaning agent directly on the evaporator leads to the desired result.

== Power consumption ==
Although air conditioners use significant power, the drag of a car with closed windows is less than if the windows are open to cool the occupants.

There has been much debate on the effect of installing air conditioning and its effect during use on the fuel efficiency of a vehicle. Factors such as increased wind resistance, engine power loading resulting in operating the engine inefficiently, additional heat loading into the cabin due to the increased engine power loading, and increased weight must be considered, to find the true difference between using the air conditioning system and not using it, when estimating the actual fuel mileage. Other factors can affect the engine, and an overall engine heat increase can affect the cooling system of the vehicle.

In a modern automobile, the A/C system will use around 4 horsepower (3.0 kW) of the engine's power to reject the target calculated heat loading of the cabin, thus increasing fuel consumption of the vehicle.

== Natural refrigerants in automotive ==
Sustainable automotive air conditioning, a return to natural refrigerants, is the subject of a debate between the chemical industry developing new hydrocarbon refrigerant blends and environmental advocacy groups, for example the now defunct The Alliance for CO_{2} Solutions, at the introduction of each new generation of automotive air conditioning refrigerants.

A debate had emanated from the decision of the European Union to phase out the current high global warming refrigerant HFC-134a in car air conditioning from January 2011 onwards. To comply with the legislation carmakers have to decide on new refrigerants with a GWP of less than 150, but will also need 3 to 4 year lead time to develop and introduce a new car platform that includes a new air conditioning system using the chosen refrigerant..

=== CO_{2} ===
==== History ====
In September 2007, the German Association of the Automotive Industry (VDA) officially announced its decision to use CO_{2} as the refrigerant in next-generation air conditioning. A working group at the European Automobile Manufacturers Association (ACEA) proposed drafting an industry-wide common position. Reports later claimed VDA members would avoid complying with the EU directive through legal loopholes.

==== Positions ====
- Deutsche Umwelthilfe - Press Release 6 September 2007
- Greenpeace Germany - News Release 6 September 2007
- Alliance for CO2 Solutions - Press Release 6 September 2007
- Alliance for CO2 Solutions - Press Release 30 July 2007
- Alliance for CO2 Solutions - Press Release 13 June 2007
- Deutsche Umwelthilfe - Press Release 13 July 2007
- German Federal Environment Agency (Umweltbundesamt) - Press Release 8 May 2007

==== Media coverage ====
- Spiegel-Online.de (06/09/2007)
- ENDS Europe Report - August edition
- "German auto industry to drop research on environmentally harmful cooling agents". International Herald Tribune. 31 July 2007. Archived from the original on 14 March 2008.

==== CO_{2} Advantages ====
CO_{2} when used as a refrigerant can be:

- More environmentally friendly with the lowest global warming potential (GWP) of all currently used and proposed refrigerants when considering the entire supply chain necessary to create the refrigerant. Because the carbon dioxide used in car air conditioning is a recycled industrial waste product, it is seen as an environmentally neutral solution.
- Technically ready because CO_{2} models have been developed and tested in all climates,
- Potentially faster to heat and cool a car,
- Potentially superior performance in over 90% of all driving conditions.
- Product lifecycle costs may be lower as CO_{2} is cheap and worldwide available. The servicing of CO_{2} systems will be less costly and less complicated than that of present systems. Total cost of ownership may be lowered with CO_{2} as it may cut fuel consumption by the air conditioning device. It is estimated, carmakers will have to initially invest €20 per unit, with no additional costs once CO_{2} Technology enters into mass production.
- Usable in Heat Pumps because at least one CO_{2} system under development can act as a heat pump, supplying cabin heat and windshield defrosting even before the engine has warmed up.
- Since CO_{2} is so cheap and relatively harmless to the environment, properly designed reservoirs in automotive air conditioning systems could store additional liquid R744 to keep a vehicle cool by continuing the operation of the blower motor even when the engine (or compressor) was not running.
- Technology is readily developed long ago. During the RACE Project from 1994 to 1997, financed by the EU with nearly 2 Million Euros, main producers of cars agreed to develop CO_{2} car AC systems. See . The result was that car AC systems for CO_{2} small cars are 45% more expensive than HFKW Units and that for the luxury class the additional cost was irrelevant.

==== CO_{2} Disadvantages ====
- CO_{2} Technology requires the costly design of completely new high-pressure system components.
- Estimated that the initial costs of CO_{2} systems that require a complete re-design will be around €5 higher than proposed drop-in refrigerant over a car's life cycle than any currently used or proposed new refrigerant.
- CO_{2} has been classified as Safety Class A1 (low-toxic, non-flammable refrigerant) by the American Society of Heating, Refrigerating and Air-Conditioning Engineers (ASHRAE) – the highest safety class possible. As the charge of CO_{2} to the air conditioning systems is very small (200-400 g) there is no real danger for the passengers, even in case of accidental release.

=== Advantages ===
- Refrigerants such as the Greenpeace-developed 'Greenfreeze', based on purified butane/propane mixtures may use smaller amounts in automotive air conditioing vs R134a, due to expected increase in system efficiency.
- The backward compatibility, with even early Freon (R-12) car air conditioning systems of pure hydrocarbon refrigerants, could allow existing systems to be converted without modification, increasing their efficiency, and preventing further release of harmful R-134a and R-12 to the atmosphere.

=== Disadvantages ===
- Flammability. Butane and propane are flammable petroleum products; commonly used as fuels for gas barbecue grills, disposable lighters, etc., where under certain flammability limits, mixed with oxygen, and ignited may combust. When used as a refrigerant, propane and butana have a designation and safety classification of A3.
- Safety. The EPA, in evaluating motor vehicle air conditioning substitutes for CFC-12 (Freon, or R-12) under its SNAP program, has classified as "Unacceptable Substitutes" other "Flammable blend[s] of hydrocarbons" because of "insufficient data to demonstrate safety." The EPA defines "Unacceptable" in this context as "illegal for use as a CFC-12 substitute in motor vehicle air conditioners". All of the refrigerants which the EPA approved for motor vehicle use in place of CFC-12 (as of September 2017) contain no more than 4% of total flammable hydrocarbons (butane, isobutane, and/or isopentane). Until furher evidence to preent the safety case for butane and propan in automotive air conditioners, it appears unlikely the EPA will approve such use case.
