= Radiator (engine cooling) =

Heat exchangers used for cooling internal combustion engines

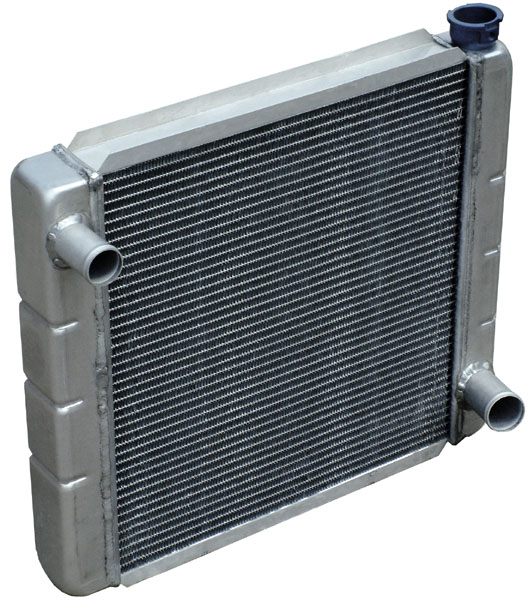
A typical engine coolant radiator used in an automobile

Radiators are heat exchangers used for cooling internal combustion engines, mainly in automobiles but also in piston-engined aircraft, railway locomotives, motorcycles, stationary generating plants or any similar use of such an engine.

Internal combustion engines are often cooled by circulating a liquid called engine coolant through the engine block and cylinder head where it is heated, then through a radiator where it loses heat to the atmosphere, and then returned to the engine. Engine coolant is usually water-based, but may also be oil. It is common to employ a water pump to force the engine coolant to circulate, and also for an axial fan to force air through the radiator.

Electric cars also make use of coolant, pumps and radiators to cool batteries and motors.

== Automobiles and motorcycles ==
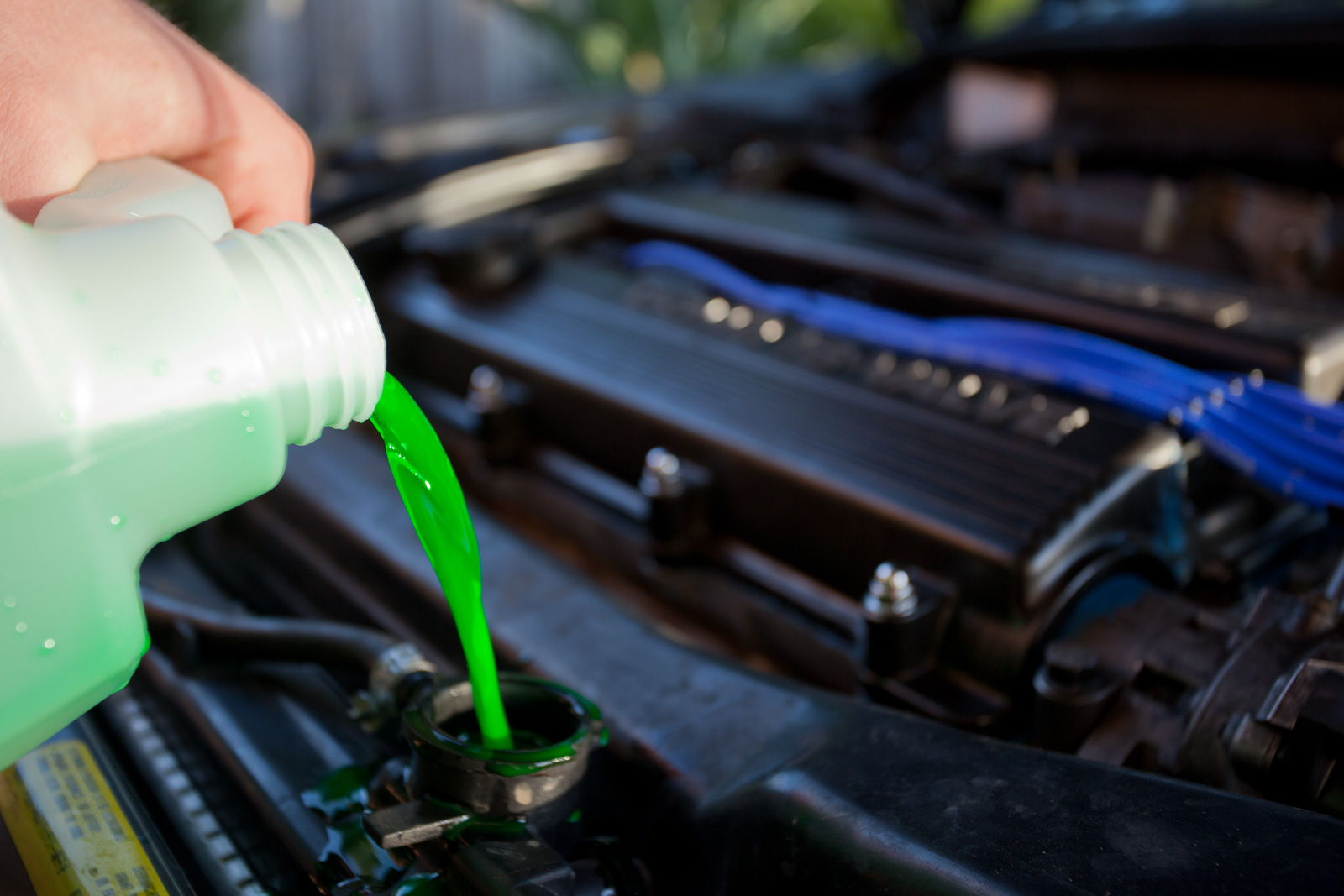
Coolant being poured into the radiator of an automobile

In automobiles and motorcycles with a liquid-cooled internal combustion engine, a radiator is connected to channels running through the engine and cylinder head, through which a liquid (coolant) is pumped by a coolant pump. This liquid may be water (in climates where water is unlikely to freeze), but is more commonly a mixture of water and antifreeze in proportions appropriate to the climate. Antifreeze itself is usually ethylene glycol or propylene glycol (with a small amount of corrosion inhibitor).

A typical automotive cooling system comprises:

- a series of galleries cast into the engine block and cylinder head, surrounding the combustion chambers with circulating liquid to carry away heat;
- a radiator, consisting of many small tubes equipped with a honeycomb of fins to dissipate heat rapidly, that receives and cools hot liquid from the engine;
- a water pump, usually of the centrifugal type, to circulate the coolant through the system;
- a thermostat to control temperature by varying the amount of coolant going to the radiator;
- a fan to draw cool air through the radiator.

The combustion process produces a large amount of heat. If heat were allowed to increase unchecked, detonation would occur, and components outside the engine would fail due to excessive temperature. To combat this effect, coolant is circulated through the engine where it absorbs heat. Once the coolant absorbs the heat from the engine it continues its flow to the radiator. The radiator transfers heat from the coolant to the passing air.

Radiators are also used to cool automatic transmission fluids, air conditioner refrigerant, intake air, and sometimes to cool motor oil or power steering fluid. A radiator is typically mounted in a position where it receives airflow from the forward movement of the vehicle, such as behind a front grille. Where engines are mid- or rear-mounted, it is common to mount the radiator behind a front grille to achieve sufficient airflow, even though this requires long coolant pipes. Alternatively, the radiator may draw air from the flow over the top of the vehicle or from a side-mounted grille. For long vehicles, such as buses, side airflow is most common for engine and transmission cooling and top airflow most common for air conditioner cooling.

=== Radiator construction ===
Automobile radiators are constructed of a pair of metal or plastic header tanks, linked by a core with many narrow passageways, giving a high surface area relative to volume. This core is usually made of stacked layers of metal sheet, pressed to form channels and soldered or brazed together. For many years radiators were made from brass or copper cores soldered to brass headers. Modern radiators have aluminum cores, and often save money and weight by using plastic headers with gaskets. This construction is more prone to failure and less easily repaired than traditional materials.

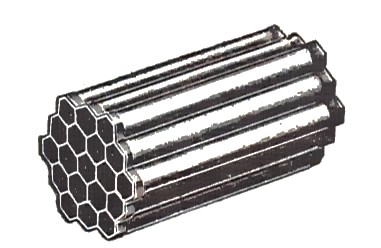
Honeycomb radiator tubes

An earlier construction method was the honeycomb radiator. Round tubes were swaged into hexagons at their ends, then stacked together and soldered. As they only touched at their ends, this formed what became in effect a solid water tank with many air tubes through it.

Some vintage cars use radiator cores made from coiled tube, a less efficient but simpler construction.

=== Coolant pump ===
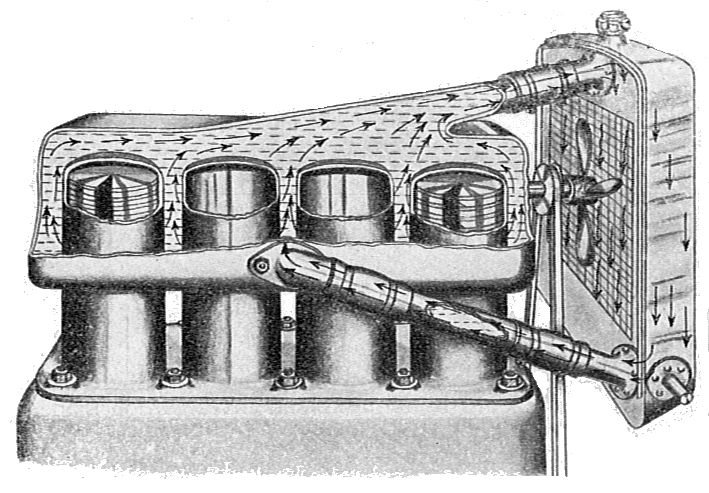
Thermosyphon cooling system of 1937, without circulating pump

Radiators first used downward vertical flow, driven solely by a thermosyphon effect. Coolant is heated in the engine, becomes less dense, and so rises. As the radiator cools the fluid, the coolant becomes denser and falls. This effect is sufficient for low-power stationary engines, but inadequate for all but the earliest automobiles. All automobiles for many years have used centrifugal pumps to circulate the engine coolant because natural circulation has very low flow rates.

=== Heater ===
A system of valves or baffles, or both, is usually incorporated to simultaneously operate a small radiator inside the vehicle. This small radiator, and the associated blower fan, is called the heater core, and serves to warm the cabin interior. Like the radiator, the heater core acts by removing heat from the engine. For this reason, automotive technicians often advise operators to turn on the heater and set it to high if the engine is overheating, to assist the main radiator.

=== Temperature control ===
==== Waterflow control ====
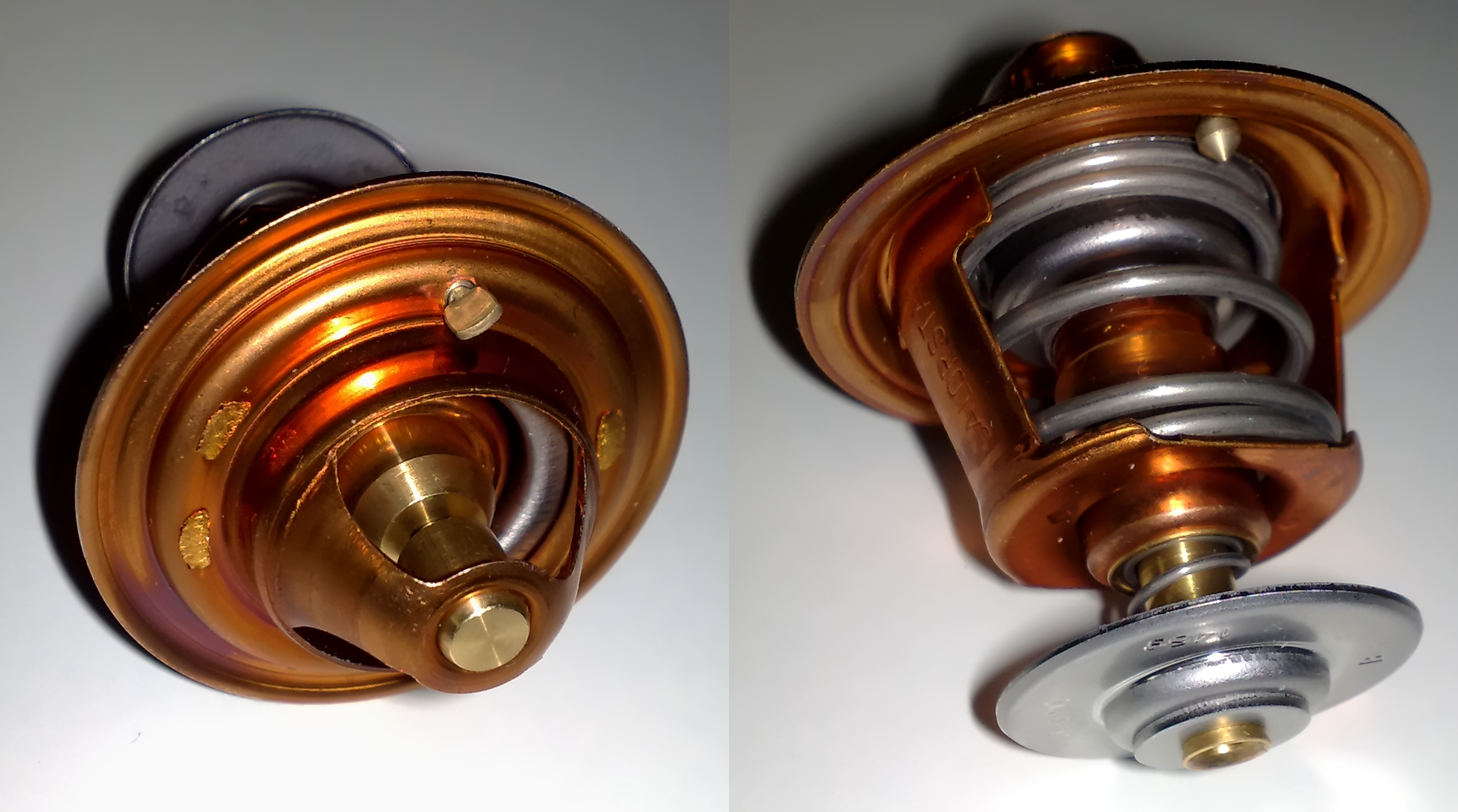
Car engine thermostat

The engine temperature on modern cars is primarily controlled by a wax-pellet type of thermostat, a valve that opens once the engine has reached its optimum operating temperature.

When the engine is cold, the thermostat is closed except for a small bypass flow so that the thermostat experiences changes to the coolant temperature as the engine warms up. Engine coolant is directed by the thermostat to the inlet of the circulating pump and is returned directly to the engine, bypassing the radiator. Directing water to circulate only through the engine allows the engine to reach optimum operating temperature as quickly as possible whilst avoiding localized "hot spots." Once the coolant reaches the thermostat's activation temperature, it opens, allowing water to flow through the radiator to prevent the temperature from rising higher.

Once at optimum temperature, the thermostat controls the flow of engine coolant to the radiator so that the engine continues to operate at optimum temperature. Under peak load conditions, such as driving slowly up a steep hill whilst heavily laden on a hot day, the thermostat will be approaching fully open because the engine will be producing near maximum power while the velocity of airflow across the radiator is low. (Being a heat exchanger, the velocity of air flow across the radiator has a major effect on its ability to dissipate heat.) Conversely, when cruising fast downhill on a motorway on a cold night on a light throttle, the thermostat will be nearly closed because the engine is producing little power, and the radiator is able to dissipate much more heat than the engine is producing. Allowing too much flow of coolant to the radiator would result in the engine being over-cooled and operating at lower than optimum temperature, resulting in decreased fuel efficiency and increased exhaust emissions. Furthermore, engine durability, reliability, and longevity are sometimes compromised, if any components (such as the crankshaft bearings) are engineered to take thermal expansion into account to fit together with the correct clearances. Another side effect of over-cooling is reduced performance of the cabin heater, though in typical cases it still blows air at a considerably higher temperature than ambient.

The thermostat is therefore constantly moving throughout its range, responding to changes in vehicle operating load, speed, and external temperature, to keep the engine at its optimum operating temperature.

On vintage cars you may find a bellows type thermostat, which has corrugated bellows containing a volatile liquid such as alcohol or acetone. These types of thermostats do not work well at cooling system pressures above about 7 psi. Modern motor vehicles typically run at around 15 psi, which precludes the use of the bellows type thermostat. On direct air-cooled engines, this is not a concern for the bellows thermostat that controls a flap valve in the air passages.

==== Airflow control ====
Other factors influence the temperature of the engine, including radiator size and the type of radiator fan. The size of the radiator (and thus its cooling capacity) is chosen such that it can keep the engine at the design temperature under the most extreme conditions a vehicle is likely to encounter (such as climbing a mountain whilst fully loaded on a hot day).

Airflow speed through a radiator is a major influence on the heat it dissipates. Vehicle speed affects this, in rough proportion to the engine effort, thus giving crude self-regulatory feedback. Where an additional cooling fan is driven by the engine, this also tracks engine speed similarly.

Engine-driven fans are often regulated by a fan clutch from the drivebelt, which slips and reduces the fan speed at low temperatures. This improves fuel efficiency by not wasting power on driving the fan unnecessarily. On modern vehicles, further regulation of cooling rate is provided by either variable speed or cycling radiator fans. Electric fans are controlled by a thermostatic switch or the engine control unit. Electric fans also have the advantage of giving good airflow and cooling at low engine revs or when stationary, such as in slow-moving traffic.

Before the development of viscous-drive and electric fans, engines were fitted with simple fixed fans that drew air through the radiator at all times. Vehicles whose design required the installation of a large radiator to cope with heavy work at high temperatures, such as commercial vehicles and tractors would often run cool in cold weather under light loads, even with the presence of a thermostat, as the large radiator and fixed fan caused a rapid and significant drop in coolant temperature as soon as the thermostat opened. This problem can be solved by fitting a radiator blind (or radiator shroud) to the radiator that can be adjusted to partially or fully block the airflow through the radiator. At its simplest the blind is a roll of material such as canvas or rubber that is unfurled along the length of the radiator to cover the desired portion. Some older vehicles, like the World War I-era Royal Aircraft Factory S.E.5 and SPAD S.XIII single-engined fighters, have a series of shutters that can be adjusted from the driver's or pilot's seat to provide a degree of control. Some modern cars have a series of shutters that are automatically opened and closed by the engine control unit to provide a balance of cooling and aerodynamics as needed.

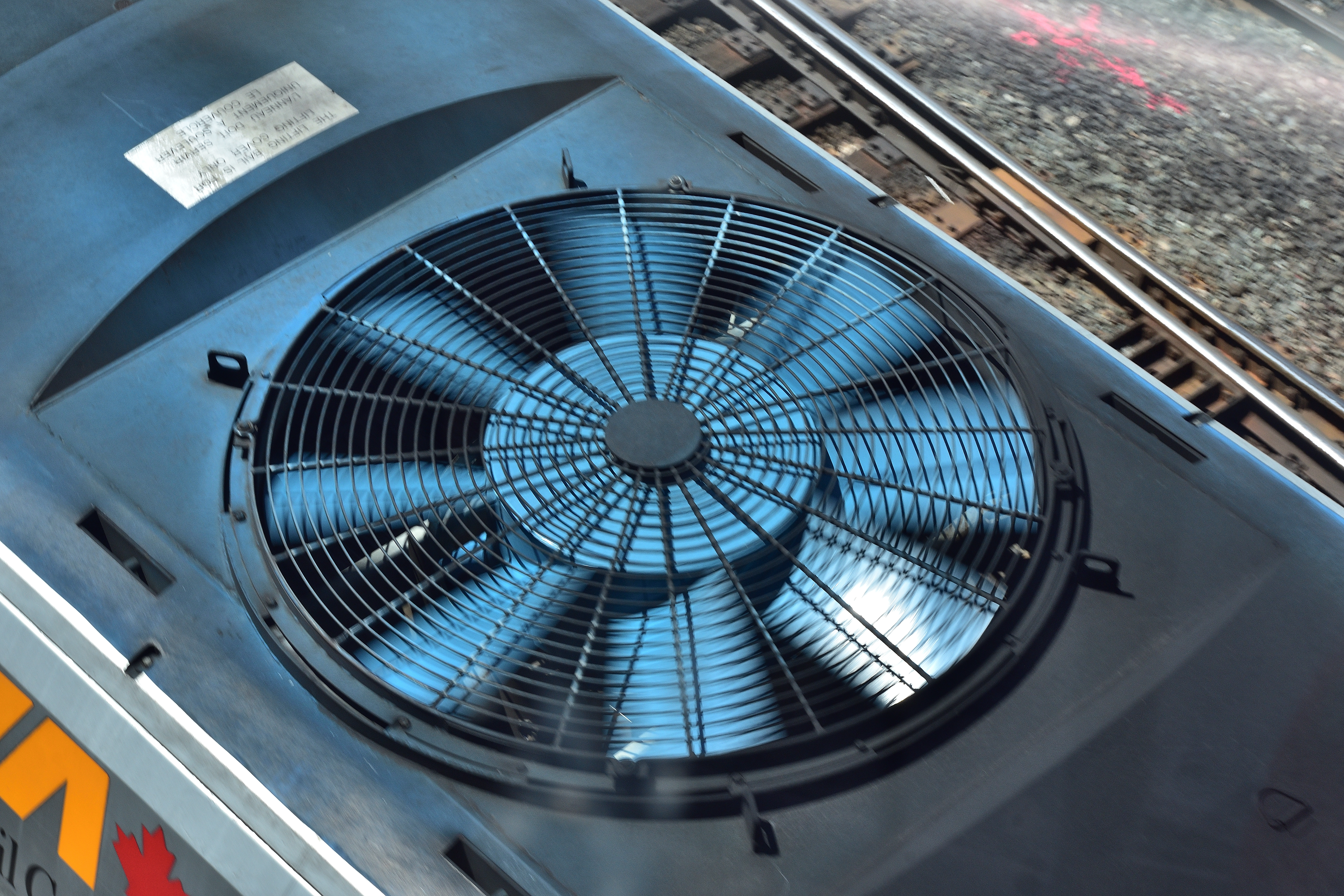
Cooling fan of radiator for prime mover of a VIA Rail GE P42DC locomotive

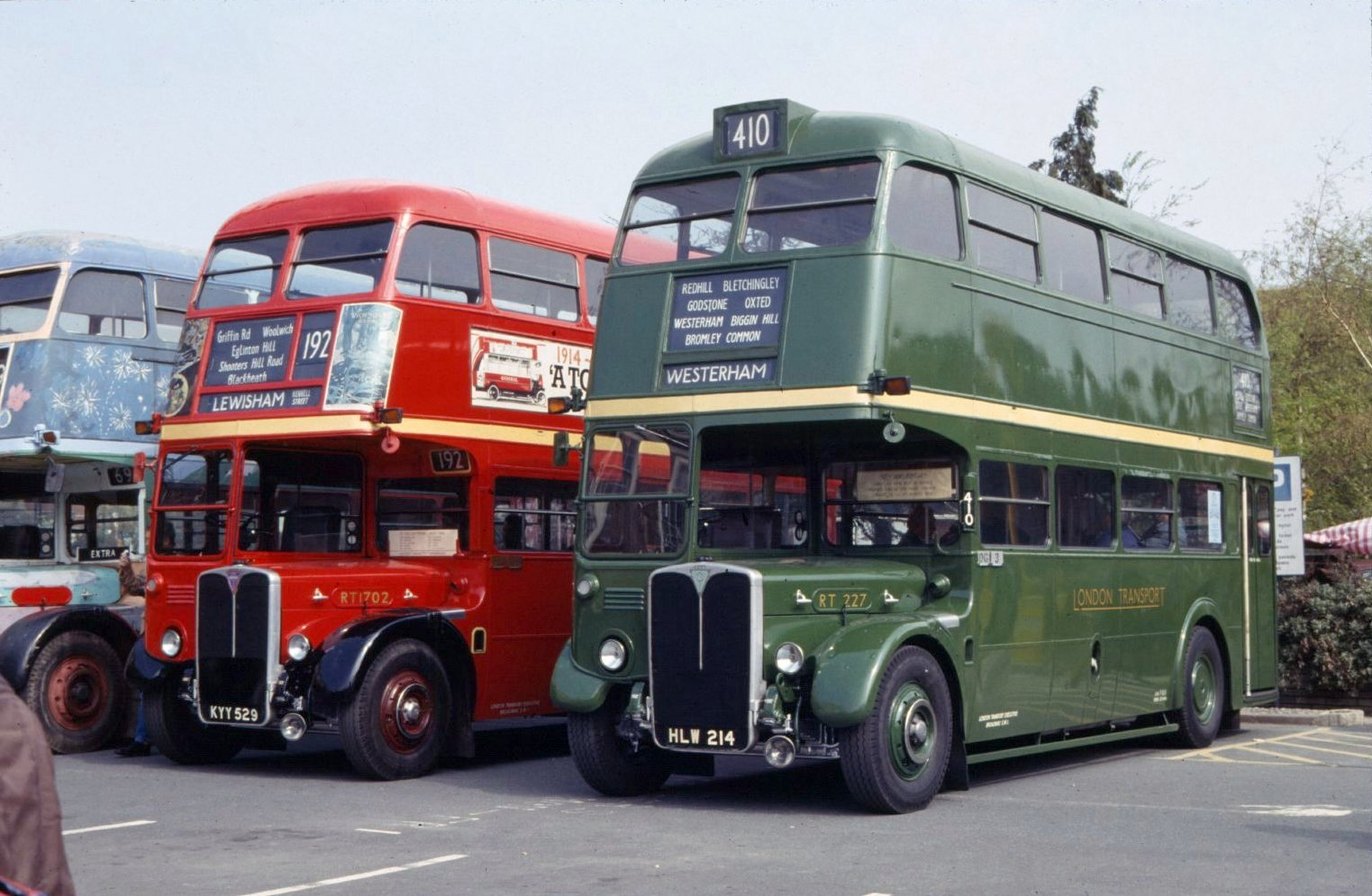
These AEC Regent III RT buses are fitted with radiator blinds, seen here covering the lower half of the radiators.

=== Coolant pressure ===
Because the thermal efficiency of internal combustion engines increases with internal temperature, the coolant is kept at higher-than-atmospheric pressure to increase its boiling point. A calibrated pressure-relief valve is usually incorporated in the radiator's fill cap. This pressure varies between models, but typically ranges from 4 to 30 psi (30 to 200 kPa).

As the coolant system pressure increases with a rise in temperature, it will reach the point where the pressure relief valve allows excess pressure to escape. This will stop when the system temperature stops rising. In the case of an over-filled radiator (or header tank) pressure is vented by allowing a little liquid to escape. This may simply drain onto the ground or be collected in a vented container which remains at atmospheric pressure. When the engine is switched off, the cooling system cools and liquid level drops. In some cases where excess liquid has been collected in a bottle, this may be 'sucked' back into the main coolant circuit. In other cases, it is not.

=== Engine coolant ===
Before World War II, engine coolant was usually plain water. Antifreeze was used solely to control freezing, and this was often only done in cold weather. If plain water is left to freeze in the block of an engine the water can expand as it freezes. This effect can cause severe internal engine damage due to the expanding of the ice.

Development in high-performance aircraft engines required improved coolants with higher boiling points, leading to the adoption of glycol or water-glycol mixtures. These led to the adoption of glycols for their antifreeze properties.

Since the development of aluminium alloy or mixed-metal engines, corrosion inhibition has become even more important than antifreeze, and in all regions and seasons.

=== Boiling or overheating ===
An overflow tank that runs dry may result in the coolant vaporizing, which can cause localized or general overheating of the engine. Severe damage may result if the vehicle is allowed to run over temperature. Failures such as blown head gaskets, and warped or cracked cylinder heads or cylinder blocks may be the result. Sometimes there will be no warning, because the temperature sensor that provides data for the temperature gauge (either mechanical or electrical) is exposed to water vapor, not the liquid coolant, providing a harmfully false reading.

Opening a hot radiator drops the system pressure, which may cause it to boil and eject dangerously hot liquid and steam. Therefore, radiator caps often contain a mechanism that attempts to relieve the internal pressure before the cap can be fully opened.

=== History ===
The invention of the automobile water radiator is attributed to Karl Benz. Wilhelm Maybach designed the first honeycomb radiator for the Mercedes 35hp.

=== Supplementary radiators ===
It is sometimes necessary for a car to be equipped with a second, or auxiliary, radiator to increase the cooling capacity, when the size of the original radiator cannot be increased. The second radiator is plumbed in series with the main radiator in the circuit. This was the case when the Audi 100 was first turbocharged creating the 200. These are not to be confused with intercoolers.

Some engines have an oil cooler, a separate small radiator to cool the engine oil. Cars with an automatic transmission often have extra connections to the radiator, allowing the transmission fluid to transfer its heat to the coolant in the radiator. These may be either oil-air radiators, as for a smaller version of the main radiator. More simply they may be oil-water coolers, where an oil pipe is inserted inside the water radiator. Though the water is hotter than the ambient air, its higher thermal conductivity offers comparable cooling (within limits) from a less complex and thus cheaper and more reliable oil cooler. Less commonly, power steering fluid, brake fluid, and other hydraulic fluids may be cooled by an auxiliary radiator on a vehicle.

Turbo charged or supercharged engines may have an intercooler, which is an air-to-air or air-to-water radiator used to cool the incoming air charge—not to cool the engine.

== Aircraft ==
Aircraft with liquid-cooled piston engines (usually inline engines rather than radial) also require radiators. As airspeed is higher than for cars, these are efficiently cooled in flight, and so do not require large areas or cooling fans. Many high-performance aircraft however suffer extreme overheating problems when idling on the ground - a mere seven minutes for a Spitfire. This is similar to Formula 1 cars of today, when stopped on the grid with engines running they require ducted air forced into their radiator pods to prevent overheating.

=== Surface radiators ===
Reducing drag is a major goal in aircraft design, including the design of cooling systems. An early technique was to take advantage of an aircraft's abundant airflow to replace the honeycomb core (many surfaces, with a high ratio of surface to volume) by a surface-mounted radiator. This uses a single surface blended into the fuselage or wing skin, with the coolant flowing through pipes at the back of this surface. Such designs were seen mostly on World War I aircraft.

As they are so dependent on airspeed, surface radiators are even more prone to overheating when ground-running. Racing aircraft such as the Supermarine S.6B, a racing seaplane with radiators built into the upper surfaces of its floats, have been described as "being flown on the temperature gauge" as the main limit on their performance.

Surface radiators have also been used by a few high-speed racing cars, such as Malcolm Campbell's Blue Bird of 1928.

=== Pressurized cooling systems ===
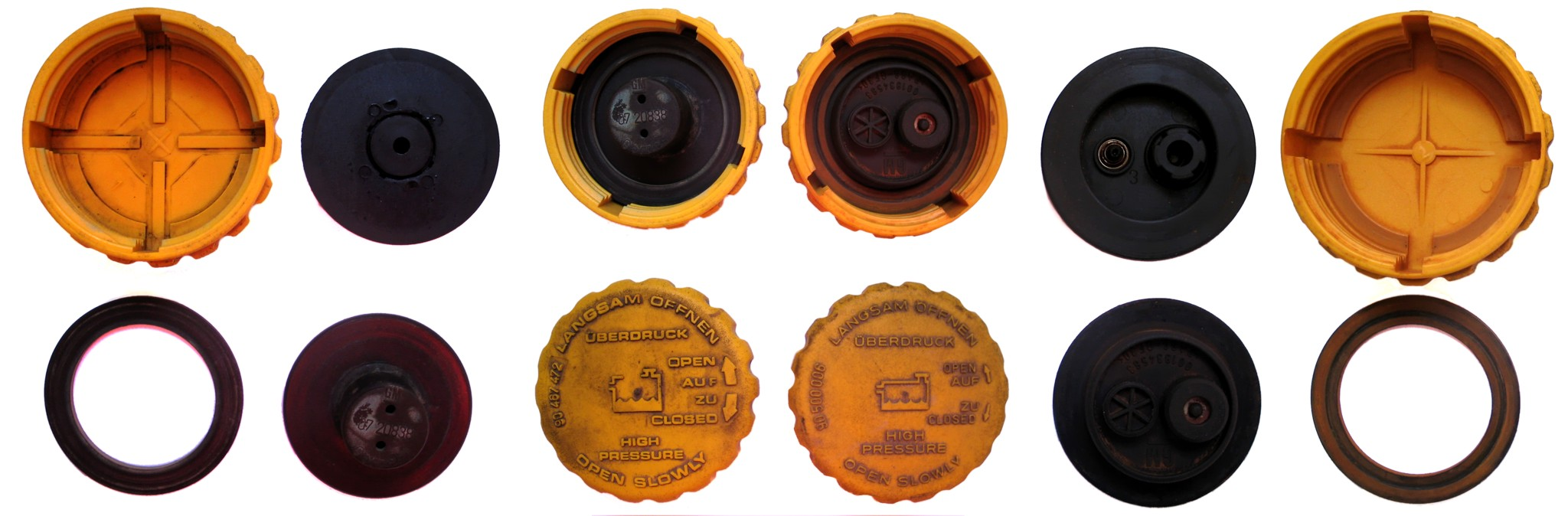
Radiator caps for pressurized automotive cooling systems. Of the two valves, one prevents the creation of a vacuum, the other limits the pressure.

It is generally a limitation of most cooling systems that the cooling fluid not be allowed to boil, as the need to handle gas in the flow greatly complicates design. For a water cooled system, this means that the maximum amount of heat transfer is limited by the specific heat capacity of water and the difference in temperature between ambient and 100 °C. This provides more effective cooling in the winter, or at higher altitudes where the temperatures are low.

Another effect that is especially important in aircraft cooling is that the specific heat capacity changes and boiling point reduces with pressure, and this pressure changes more rapidly with altitude than the drop in temperature. Thus, generally, liquid cooling systems lose capacity as the aircraft climbs. This was a major limit on performance during the 1930s when the introduction of turbosuperchargers first allowed convenient travel at altitudes above 15,000 ft, and cooling design became a major area of research.

The most obvious, and common, solution to this problem was to run the entire cooling system under pressure. This maintained the specific heat capacity at a constant value, while the outside air temperature continued to drop. Such systems thus improved cooling capability as they climbed. For most uses, this solved the problem of cooling high-performance piston engines, and almost all liquid-cooled aircraft engines of the World War II period used this solution.

However, pressurized systems were also more complex, and far more susceptible to damage - as the cooling fluid was under pressure, even minor damage in the cooling system like a single rifle-calibre bullet hole, would cause the liquid to rapidly spray out of the hole. Failures of the cooling systems were, by far, the leading cause of engine failures.

=== Evaporative cooling ===
Although it is more difficult to build an aircraft radiator that is able to handle steam, it is by no means impossible. The key requirement is to provide a system that condenses the steam back into liquid before passing it back into the pumps and completing the cooling loop. Such a system can take advantage of the specific heat of vaporization, which in the case of water is five times the specific heat capacity in the liquid form. Additional gains may be had by allowing the steam to become superheated. Such systems, known as evaporative coolers, were the topic of considerable research in the 1930s.

Consider two cooling systems that are otherwise similar, operating at an ambient air temperature of 20 °C. An all-liquid design might operate between 30 °C and 90 °C, offering 60 °C of temperature difference to carry away heat. An evaporative cooling system might operate between 80 °C and 110 °C. At first glance this appears to be much less temperature difference, but this analysis overlooks the enormous amount of heat energy soaked up during the generation of steam, equivalent to 500 °C. In effect, the evaporative version is operating between 80 °C and 560 °C, a 480 °C effective temperature difference. Such a system can be effective even with much smaller amounts of water.

The downside to the evaporative cooling system is the area of the condensers required to cool the steam back below the boiling point. As steam is much less dense than water, a correspondingly larger surface area is needed to provide enough airflow to cool the steam back down. The Rolls-Royce Goshawk design of 1933 used conventional radiator-like condensers and this design proved to be a serious problem for drag. In Germany, the Günter brothers developed an alternative design combining evaporative cooling and surface radiators spread all over the aircraft wings, fuselage and even the rudder. Several aircraft were built using their design and set numerous performance records, notably the Heinkel He 119 and Heinkel He 100. However, these systems required numerous pumps to return the liquid from the spread-out radiators and proved to be extremely difficult to keep running properly, and were much more susceptible to battle damage. Efforts to develop this system had generally been abandoned by 1940. The need for evaporative cooling was soon to be negated by the widespread availability of ethylene glycol based coolants, which had a lower specific heat, but a much higher boiling point than water.

=== Radiator thrust ===
An aircraft radiator contained in a duct heats the air passing through, causing the air to expand and gain velocity. This is called the Meredith effect, and high-performance piston aircraft with well-designed low-drag radiators (notably the P-51 Mustang) derive thrust from it. The thrust was significant enough to offset the drag of the duct the radiator was enclosed in and allowed the aircraft to achieve zero cooling drag. At one point, there were even plans to equip a Mustang with an afterburner, by injecting fuel into the exhaust duct after the radiator and igniting it. Afterburning is achieved by injecting additional fuel into the engine downstream of the main combustion cycle.

== Stationary plant ==
Engines for stationary plant are normally cooled by radiators in the same way as automobile engines. There are some unique differences, depending on the stationary plant – careful planning must be taken to ensure proper air flow across the radiator to ensure proper cooling. In some cases, evaporative cooling is used via a cooling tower.

== See also ==
- Coolant
- Heater core
- Intercooler
- Internal combustion engine (ICE)
- List of auto parts
- Waste heat
