= Internal combustion engine cooling =

Waste-heat-removal system

Internal combustion engine cooling uses either air or liquid to remove the waste heat from an internal combustion engine. For small or special purpose engines, cooling using air from the atmosphere makes for a lightweight and relatively simple system. Watercraft can use water directly from the surrounding environment to cool their engines. For water-cooled engines on aircraft and surface vehicles, waste heat is transferred from a closed loop of water pumped through the engine to the surrounding atmosphere by a radiator.

Water has a higher heat capacity than air, and can thus move heat more quickly away from the engine, but a radiator and pumping system add weight, complexity, and cost. Higher power engines can move more weight but can also generate more waste heat, meaning they are generally water-cooled. Radial engines allow air to flow around each cylinder directly, giving them an advantage for air cooling over straight engines, flat engines, and V engines. Rotary engines have a similar configuration, but the cylinders also continually rotate, creating an air flow even when the vehicle is stationary.

Aircraft design more strongly favors lower weight and air-cooled designs. Rotary engines were popular on aircraft until the end of World War I, but had serious stability and efficiency problems. Radial engines were popular until the end of World War II, until gas turbine engines largely replaced them. Modern propeller-driven aircraft with internal-combustion engines are still largely air-cooled. Modern cars generally favor power over weight, and typically have water-cooled engines. Modern motorcycles are lighter than cars and both cooling methods are common. Some sport motorcycles are cooled with both air and oil that is sprayed underneath the piston heads.

== Overview ==
Heat engines generate mechanical power by extracting energy from heat flows, much as a water wheel extracts mechanical power from a flow of mass falling through a distance. Engines are inefficient, so more heat energy enters the engine than comes out as mechanical power; the difference is waste heat which must be removed. Internal combustion engines remove waste heat through cool intake air, hot exhaust gasses, and explicit engine cooling.

Engines with higher efficiency have more energy leave as mechanical motion and less as waste heat. Some waste heat is essential: it guides heat through the engine, much as a water wheel works only if there is some exit velocity (energy) in the waste water to carry it away and make room for more water. Thus all heat engines need cooling to operate.

Cooling is also needed because high temperatures damage engine materials and lubricants and becomes even more important in hot climates. Internal-combustion engines burn fuel hotter than the melting temperature of engine materials, and hot enough to set fire to lubricants. Engine cooling removes energy fast enough to keep temperatures low so the engine can survive.

Some high-efficiency engines run without explicit cooling and with only incidental heat loss, a design called adiabatic. Such engines can achieve high efficiency but compromise power output, duty cycle, engine weight, durability, and emissions.

== Basic principles ==
Most internal combustion engines are fluid cooled using either air (a gaseous fluid) or a liquid coolant run through a heat exchanger (radiator) cooled by air. Marine engines and some stationary engines have ready access to a large volume of water at a suitable temperature. The water may be used directly to cool the engine, but often has sediment, which can clog coolant passages, or chemicals, such as salt which can chemically damage the engine. Thus, engine coolant may be run through a heat exchanger that is cooled by the body of water.

Most liquid-cooled engines use a mixture of water and chemicals such as antifreeze, rust inhibitors, and other additives. These antifreeze mixtures, also known as "engine coolant," are typically glycol-based fluids that contain a mixture of ethylene glycol, additives, and water. Common types of coolants include Inorganic Acid Technology (IAT), Organic Acid Technology (OAT), and Hybrid Organic Acid Technology (HOAT) fluids. Some antifreezes use no water at all, instead relying on liquids with different properties, such as propylene glycol or a combination of propylene glycol and ethylene glycol. While air-cooled engines primarily rely on air to regulate temperature, many also use oil cooling to help maintain optimal temperatures for both engine components and the oil itself. Most liquid-cooled engines use some air cooling, with the intake stroke of air cooling the combustion chamber. An exception is in a Wankel engine, where some parts of the combustion chamber are never cooled by intake, requiring extra effort for successful operation.

There are many demands on a cooling system. One key requirement is to adequately serve the entire engine, as the whole engine fails if just one part overheats. Therefore, it is vital that the cooling system keep all parts at suitably low temperatures. Liquid-cooled engines are able to vary the size of their passageways through the engine block so that coolant flow may be tailored to the needs of each area. Locations with either high peak temperatures (narrow islands around the combustion chamber) or high heat flow (around exhaust ports) may require generous cooling. This reduces the occurrence of hot spots, which are more difficult to avoid with air cooling. Air-cooled engines may also vary their cooling capacity by using more closely spaced cooling fins in that area, but this can make their manufacture difficult and expensive.

Only the fixed parts of the engine, such as the block and head, are cooled directly by the main coolant system. Moving parts such as the pistons, and to a lesser extent the crankshaft and connecting rods, must rely on the lubrication oil as a coolant, or to a very limited amount of conduction into the block and thence the main coolant. High performance engines frequently have additional oil, beyond the amount needed for lubrication, sprayed upwards onto the bottom of the piston just for extra cooling. Air-cooled motorcycles often rely heavily on oil-cooling in addition to air-cooling of the cylinder barrels.

Liquid-cooled engines usually have a circulation pump. The first engines relied on thermosiphon cooling alone, where hot coolant left the top of the engine block and passed to the radiator, where it was cooled before returning to the bottom of the engine. Circulation was powered by convection alone.

Other demands include cost, weight, reliability, and durability of the cooling system itself.

Conductive heat transfer is proportional to the temperature difference between materials. If engine metal is at 250 °C and the air is at 20 °C, then there is a 230 °C temperature difference for cooling. An air-cooled engine uses all of this difference. In contrast, a liquid-cooled engine might dump heat from the engine to a liquid, heating the liquid to 135 °C (water's standard boiling point of 100 °C can be exceeded as the cooling system is both pressurised, and uses a mixture with antifreeze) which is then cooled with 20 °C air. In each step, the liquid-cooled engine has half the temperature difference and so at first appears to need twice the cooling area.

However, properties of the coolant (water, oil, or air) also affect cooling. As example which compares water and oil as coolants, one gram of oil can absorb about 55% of the heat for the same rise in temperature (called the specific heat capacity). Oil has about 90% the density of water, so a given volume of oil can absorb only about 50% of the energy of the same volume of water. The thermal conductivity of water is about four times that of oil, which can aid heat transfer. The viscosity of oil can be ten times greater than water, increasing the energy required to pump oil for cooling, and reducing the net power output of the engine.

Comparing air and water, air has vastly lower heat capacity per gram and per volume (4000) and less than a tenth the conductivity, but also much lower viscosity (about 200 times lower: 17.4 × 10^{−6} Pa·s for air vs 8.94 × 10^{−4} Pa·s for water). Continuing the calculation from two paragraphs above, air cooling needs ten times of the surface area, therefore the fins, and air needs 2000 times the flow velocity and thus a recirculating air fan needs ten times the power of a recirculating water pump.

Moving heat from the cylinder to a large surface area for air cooling can present problems including difficulties manufacturing the shapes needed for good heat transfer and the space needed for free flow of a large volume of air. Water boils at about the same temperature desired for engine cooling. This has an advantage in that it absorbs a great deal of energy with very little rise in temperature (called heat of vaporization), which is good for keeping things cool, especially for passing one stream of coolant over several hot objects and achieving uniform temperature. In contrast, passing air over several hot objects in series warms the air at each step, so the first may be over-cooled and the last under-cooled. However, once water boils, it is an insulator, leading to a sudden loss of cooling where steam bubbles form. Steam may return to water as it mixes with other coolant, so an engine temperature gauge can indicate an acceptable temperature even though local temperatures are high enough that damage is being done.

An engine needs different temperatures. The inlet including the compressor of a turbo and in the inlet trumpets and the inlet valves need to be as cold as possible. A countercurrent heat exchanger with forced cooling air does the job. The cylinder-walls should not heat up the air before compression, but also not cool down the gas at the combustion. A compromise is a wall temperature of 90 °C. The viscosity of the oil is optimized for just this temperature. Any cooling of the exhaust and the turbine of the turbocharger reduces the amount of power available to the turbine, so the exhaust system is often insulated between engine and turbocharger to keep the exhaust gasses as hot as possible.

The temperature of the cooling air may range from well below freezing to 50 °C. Further, while engines in long-haul boat or rail service may operate at a steady load, road vehicles often see widely varying and quickly varying load. Thus, the cooling system is designed to vary cooling so the engine is neither too hot nor too cold. Cooling system regulation includes adjustable baffles in the air flow (sometimes called 'shutters' and commonly run by a pneumatic 'shutterstat'); a fan which operates either independently of the engine, such as an electric fan, or which has an adjustable clutch; and a thermostatic valve or a thermostat that can block the coolant flow when too cool. In addition, the motor, coolant, and heat exchanger have some heat capacity which smooths out temperature increase in short sprints. Some engine controls shut down an engine or limit it to half throttle if it overheats. Modern electronic engine controls adjust cooling based on throttle to anticipate a temperature rise, and limit engine power output to compensate for finite cooling.

Finally, other concerns may dominate cooling system design. As example, air is a relatively poor coolant, but air cooling systems are simple, and failure rates typically rise as the square of the number of failure points. Also, cooling capacity is reduced only slightly by small air coolant leaks. Where reliability is of utmost importance, as in aircraft, it may be a good trade-off to give up efficiency, longevity (interval between engine rebuilds), and quietness in order to achieve slightly higher reliability; the consequences of a broken airplane engine are so severe, even a slight increase in reliability is worth giving up other good properties to achieve it.

Air-cooled and liquid-cooled engines are both used commonly. Each principle has advantages and disadvantages, and particular applications may favor one over the other. For example, most cars and trucks use liquid-cooled engines, while many small airplane and low-cost engines are air-cooled.

== Generalization difficulties ==
It is difficult to make generalizations about air-cooled and liquid-cooled engines. Air-cooled diesel engines are chosen for reliability even in extreme heat, because air-cooling would be simpler and more effective at coping with the extremes of temperatures during the depths of winter and height of summer, than water cooling systems, and are often used in situations where the engine runs unattended for months at a time.

Similarly, it is usually desirable to minimize the number of heat transfer stages in order to maximize the temperature difference at each stage. However, Detroit Diesel two-stroke cycle engines commonly use oil cooled by water, with the water in turn cooled by air.

The coolant used in many liquid-cooled engines must be renewed periodically and can freeze at ordinary temperatures thus causing permanent engine damage when it expands. Air-cooled engines do not require coolant service, and do not suffer damage from freezing, two commonly cited advantages for air-cooled engines. However, coolant based on propylene glycol is liquid to −55 °C, colder than is encountered by many engines; shrinks slightly when it crystallizes, thus avoiding damage; and has a service life over 10,000 hours, essentially the lifetime of many engines.

It is usually more difficult to achieve either low emissions or low noise from an air-cooled engine, two more reasons most road vehicles use liquid-cooled engines. It is also often difficult to build large air-cooled engines, so nearly all air-cooled engines are under 500 kW (670 hp), whereas large liquid-cooled engines exceed 80 MW (107000 hp) (Wärtsilä-Sulzer RTA96-C 14-cylinder diesel).

== Air-cooling ==
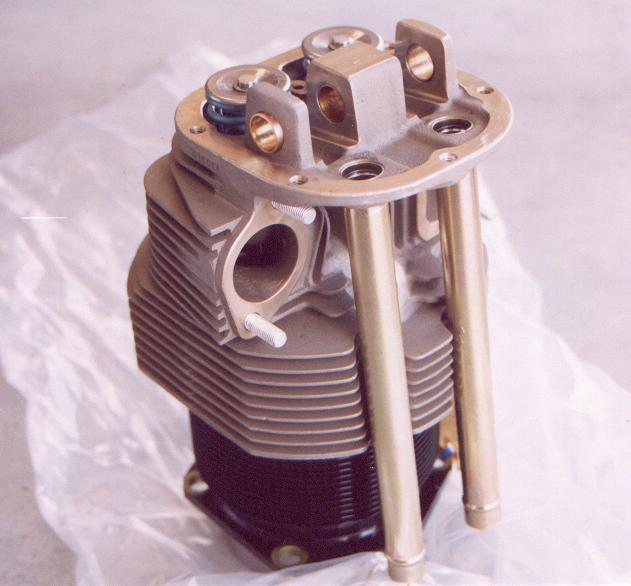
A cylinder from an air-cooled aviation engine, a Continental C85 Notice the rows of fins on both the steel cylinder barrel and the aluminum cylinder head. The fins provide additional surface area for air to pass over the cylinder and absorb heat.

Cars and trucks using direct air cooling (without an intermediate liquid) were built over a long period from the very beginning and ending with a small and generally unrecognized technical change. Before World War II, water-cooled cars and trucks routinely overheated while climbing mountain roads, creating geysers of boiling cooling water. That was considered normal, and at the time, most noted mountain roads had auto repair shops to minister to overheating engines.

ACS (Auto Club Suisse) maintains historical monuments to that era on the Susten Pass where two radiator refill stations remain. They have instructions on a cast metal plaque and a spherical bottom watering can hanging next to a water spigot. The spherical bottom was intended to keep it from being set down thus being useless around the house, in spite of which it was stolen, as the picture shows.

During that period, European firms such as Magirus-Deutz built air-cooled diesel trucks, Porsche built air-cooled farm tractors and Volkswagen became famous with air-cooled passenger cars. In the United States, Franklin built air-cooled engines.

For many years air cooling was favored for military applications as liquid cooling systems are more vulnerable to damage by shrapnel.

The Czech Republic–based company Tatra is known for their large displacement air-cooled V8 car engines; Tatra engineer Julius Mackerle published a book on it. Air-cooled engines are better adapted to extremely cold and hot environmental weather temperatures: you can see air-cooled engines starting and running in freezing conditions that seized water-cooled engines and continue working when water-cooled ones start producing steam jets. Air-cooled engines possibly have an advantage from a thermodynamic point of view due to higher operating temperature. The worst problem met in air-cooled aircraft engines was the so-called "shock cooling", when the airplane entered in a dive after climbing or level flight with throttle open, with the engine under no load while the airplane dives generating less heat, and the flow of air that cools the engine is increased, a catastrophic engine failure may result as different parts of engine have different temperatures, and thus different thermal expansions. In such conditions, the engine may seize, and any sudden change or imbalance in the relation between heat produced by the engine and heat dissipated by cooling may result in an increased wear of engine, as a consequence also of thermal expansion differences between parts of engine, liquid-cooled engines having more stable and uniform working temperatures.

== Liquid cooling ==
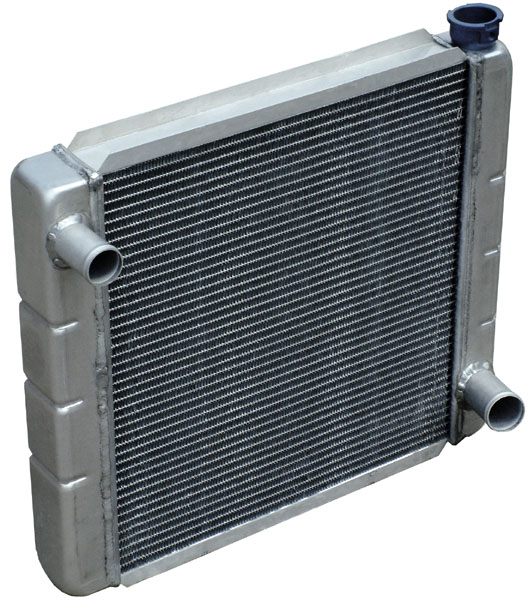
A typical engine coolant radiator used in an automobile

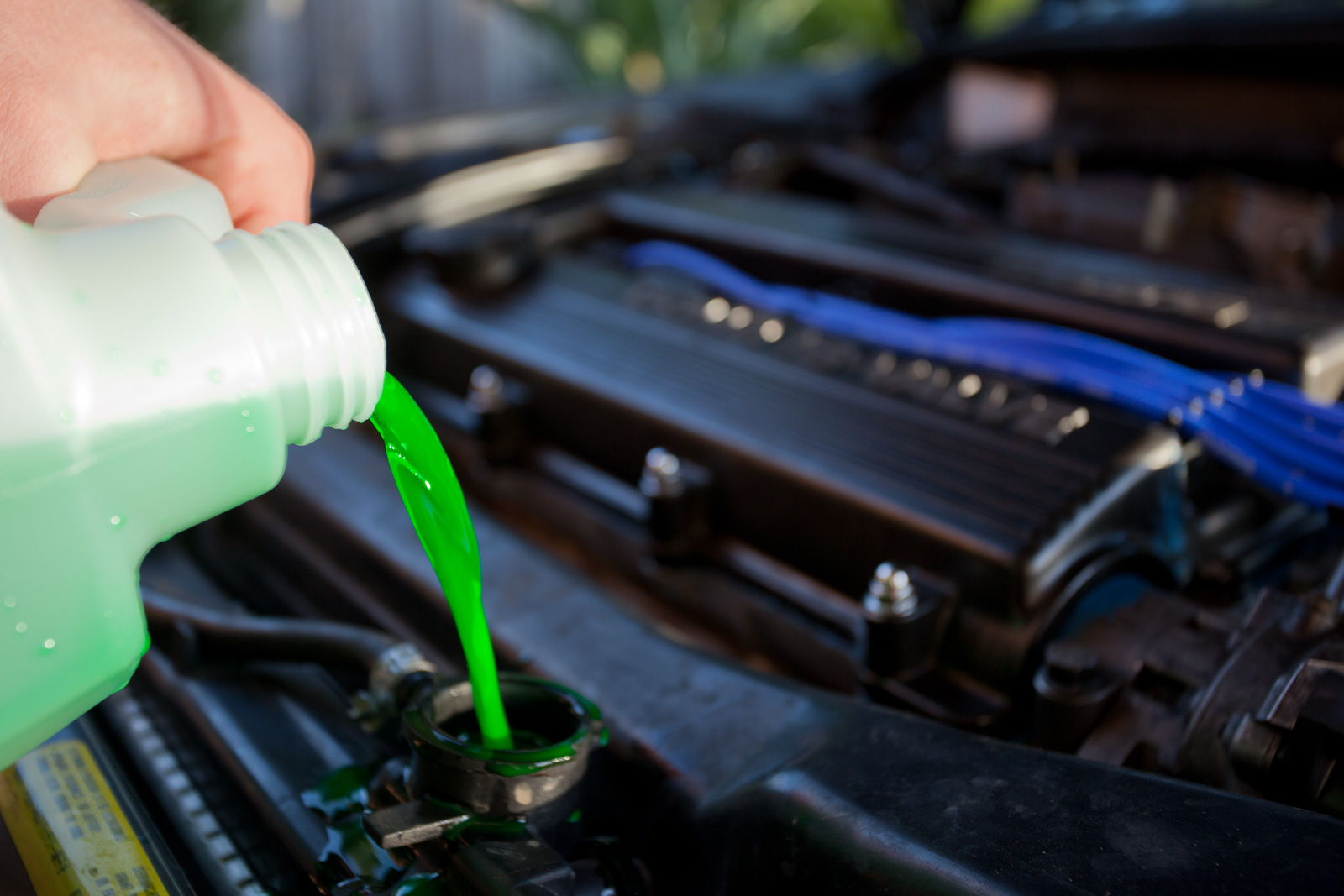
Coolant being poured into the radiator of an automobile

Today, most automotive and larger IC engines are liquid-cooled.

A fully closed IC engine cooling system

Open IC engine cooling system

Semi-closed IC engine cooling system

Liquid cooling is also employed in maritime vehicles (vessels, ...). For vessels, the seawater itself is mostly used for cooling. In some cases chemical coolants are also employed (in closed systems) or they are mixed with seawater cooling.

== Transition from air cooling ==
The change of air cooling to liquid cooling occurred at the start of World War II when the US military needed reliable vehicles. The subject of boiling engines was addressed, researched, and a solution found. Previous radiators and engine blocks were properly designed and survived durability tests, but used water pumps with a leaky graphite-lubricated "rope" seal (gland) on the pump shaft. The seal was inherited from steam engines, where water loss is accepted, since steam engines already expend large volumes of water. Because the pump seal leaked mainly when the pump was running and the engine was hot, the water loss evaporated inconspicuously, leaving at best a small rusty trace when the engine stopped and cooled, thereby not revealing significant water loss. Automobile radiators (or heat exchangers) have an outlet that feeds cooled water to the engine and the engine has an outlet that feeds heated water to the top of the radiator. Water circulation is aided by a rotary pump that has only a slight effect, having to work over such a wide range of speeds that its impeller has only a minimal effect as a pump. While running the leaking pump seal drained cooling water to a level where the pump could no longer return water to the top of the radiator, so water circulation ceased and water in the engine boiled. However, since water loss led to overheat and further water loss from boil-over, the original water loss was hidden.

After isolating the pump problem, cars and trucks built for the war effort (no civilian cars were built during that time) were equipped with carbon-seal water pumps that did not leak and caused no more geysers. Meanwhile, air cooling advanced in memory of boiling engines even though boil-over was no longer a common problem. Air-cooled engines became popular throughout Europe. After the war, Volkswagen advertised in the US as not boiling over, even though new water-cooled cars no longer boiled over, but the cars sold well. But as air quality awareness rose in the 1960s and laws governing exhaust emissions were passed, unleaded gas replaced leaded gas and leaner fuel mixtures became the norm. Subaru chose liquid-cooling for their EA series (flat) engine when it was introduced in 1966.

== Low heat rejection engines ==
A special class of experimental prototype internal combustion piston engines have been developed over several decades with the goal of improving efficiency by reducing heat loss. The engines are variously called adiabatic engines, due to better approximation of adiabatic expansion, low heat rejection engines, or high-temperature engines. They are generally diesel engines with combustion chamber parts lined with ceramic thermal barrier coatings. Some make use of titanium pistons and other titanium parts due to its low thermal conductivity and mass. Some designs are able to eliminate the use of a cooling system and associated parasitic losses altogether. Developing lubricants able to withstand the higher temperatures involved has been a major barrier to commercialization.

== See also ==
- Heater core
- Hopper cooling

== Sources ==
- Biermann, Arnold E.; Ellerbrock, Herman H. Jr (1939). The design of fins for air-cooled cylinders (PDF). NACA. Report Nº. 726.
- P V Lamarque: "The Design of Cooling Fins for Motor-Cycle Engines". Report of the Automobile Research Committee, Institution of Automobile Engineers Magazine, March 1943 issue, and also in "The Institution of Automobile Engineers Proceedings, XXXVII, Session 1942-43, pp 99-134 and 309-312.
- "Air-cooled Automotive Engines", Julius Mackerle, M. E.; Charles Griffin & Company Ltd., London, 1972.
- engineeringtoolbox.com for physical properties of air, oil and water
- https://automotivedroid.com/can-low-coolant-cause-rough-idle/ for Low coolant causing rough idle.
