= Eurammon =

Eurammon (stylised as eurammon) is a European non-profit initiative for natural refrigerants. It was set up in 1996 and comprises a global network of companies, institutions, and industry experts. It is based in Frankfurt (Main), Germany. The objective of Eurammon is to jointly promote the greater use of natural refrigerants in refrigeration, air conditioning and heat pump systems, as they have almost no effect on global warming and on the depletion of the ozone layer.

== Background and objectives ==
Natural refrigerants have been used for refrigeration since the mid-19th century, mainly in food production and storage. Ammonia (NH3), in particular, has been the refrigerant in use in industrial refrigeration for more than 130 years. In the 1950s and 60s, however, it began to be replaced more and more in new plants by synthetic refrigerants.

The Eurammon initiative arose out of the lack of acceptance for natural refrigerants. The initiative's objective is to promote the use of natural refrigerants as ammonia, CO2, hydrocarbons, air and water. For its members, Eurammon acts as a knowledge pool or platform facilitating the worldwide sharing of information and international networking.

== Activities of the eurammon initiative ==
=== eurammon Student's Day ===
This annual event, organised by eurammon in cooperation with universities and vocational schools, informs future professionals, operators, planners, system engineers, and other interested parties about the latest developments in applications of natural refrigerants. The latest legislation and the analysis of life-cycle costs of refrigeration systems are just some of the topics discussed eurammon Student´s Day 2025 - eurammon.

=== Steering Committee ===
The eurammon Steering Committee considers technical issues and new developments in the field of natural refrigerants. The team is supported by adhoc task forces to address technical and policy issues concerning all aspects of natural refrigerants that come to eurammon's attention. Thematically, the issues concern all areas of refrigeration technology in which natural refrigerants are or could be used. The committee is open to all eurammon members interested in technical debate and who wish to develop their know-how in this field About us | eurammon.

=== International network ===
Eurammon facilitates the worldwide sharing of information and international networking through an international network, which the initiative has been building up since its foundation in 1996. Mutual memberships and cooperations are currently in place with:

- Association of Ammonia Refrigeration (AAR), India – Pune
- Association Française du Froid (AFF), France – Paris
- Australian Refrigeration Association, Australia – Bowral NSW
- HVAC&R Management Technology Development Center, Iran – Tehran
- International Academy of Refrigeration, Representative Office in Kazakhstan, Kazakhstan – Almaty
- International Institute of All-Natural Refrigeration (IIAR), USA – Arlington, VA
- Islamic Azad University, Iran – Tehran
- Odesa State Academy of Refrigeration (OSAR), Ukraine – Odesa
- Romanian General Association of Refrigeration, Romania – Bucharest
- Swiss Association for Refrigeration Technology (SVK), Switzerland – Maur

=== Executive Board ===
A new executive board is elected every two years. It is currently composed of the following six members:

- Rob Vandenboer (EVAPCO Europe BV)
- Michael Freiherr (Güntner GmbH)
- Stina Forsberg (KRAHN Specialty Fluids AB.)
- Jan-Peter Nissen (Kreuzträger Kältetechnik GmbH & Co. KG )
- Dietram Oppelt (HEAT GmbH)
- Menno van der Hoff (Triple Aqua Consulting Ltd)
