= Natural refrigerant =

Sustainable refrigerants

Natural refrigerants are considered substances that serve as refrigerants in refrigeration systems (including refrigerators, HVAC, and air conditioning). They are alternatives to synthetic refrigerants such as chlorofluorocarbon (CFC), hydrochlorofluorocarbon (HCFC), and hydrofluorocarbon (HFC) based refrigerants. Unlike other refrigerants, natural refrigerants can be found in nature and are commercially available thanks to physical industrial processes like fractional distillation, chemical reactions such as Haber process and spin-off gases. The most prominent of these include various natural hydrocarbons, carbon dioxide, ammonia, and water. With the current technologies available, almost 75 percent of the refrigeration and air conditioning sector has the potential to be converted to natural refrigerants.

== Background ==
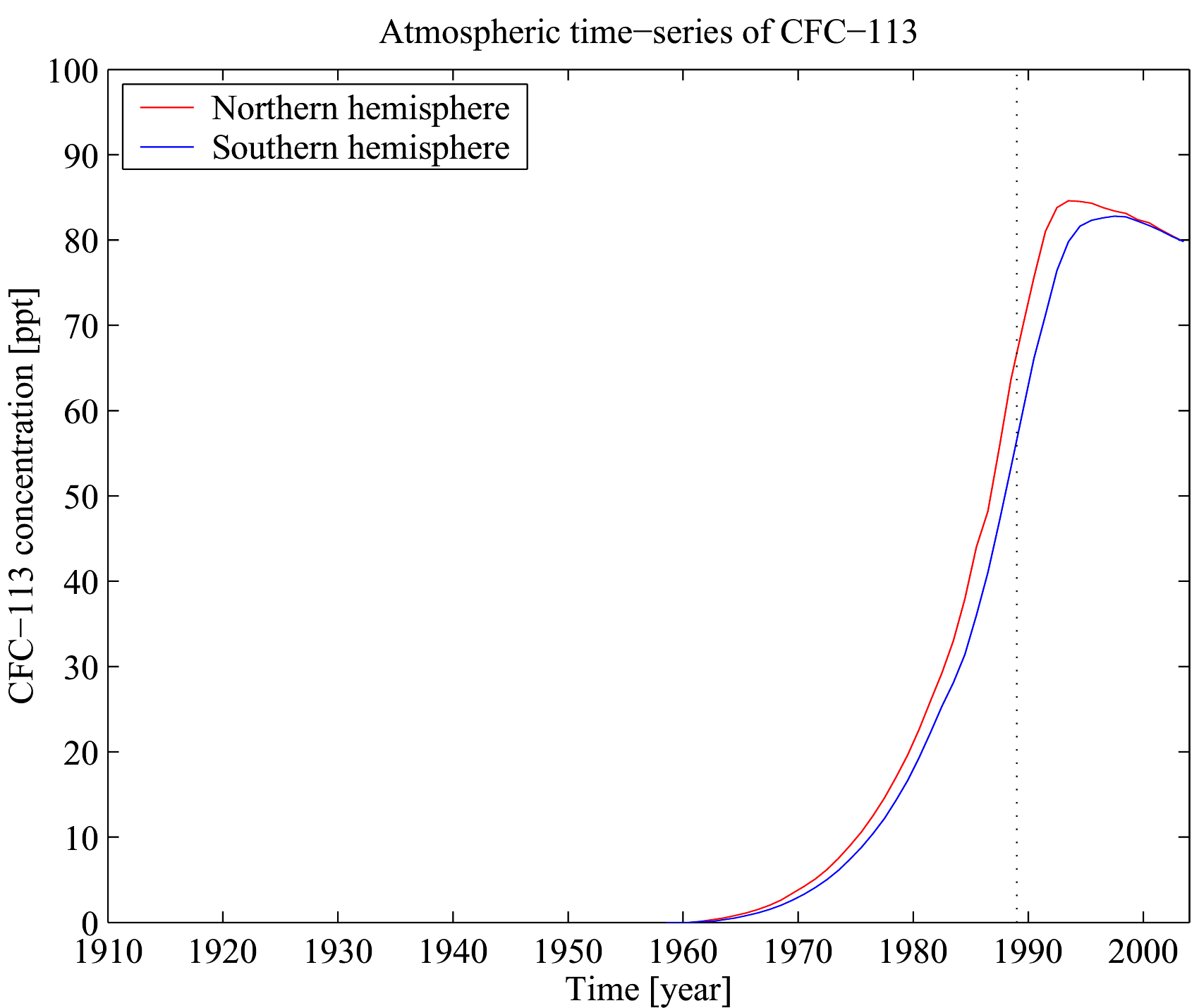
CFCs in the Atmosphere Over Time in Parts Per Trillion

Synthetic refrigerants have been used in refrigeration systems since the creation of CFCs and HCFCs in 1929. When these refrigerants leak out of systems and into the atmosphere they can have adverse results on the ozone layer and global warming. CFC refrigerants contain carbon, fluorine, and chlorine and become a significant source of inorganic chlorine in the stratosphere after their photolytic decomposition by UV radiation. Released chlorine also becomes active in destroying the ozone layer. HCFCs have shorter atmospheric lifetimes than CFCs due to their addition of hydrogen, but still have adverse effects on the environment from their chlorine elements. HFCs do not contain chlorine and have short atmospheric lives, but still absorb infrared radiation to contribute to the greenhouse effect from their fluorine elements.

In 1987 the Montreal Protocol first acknowledged these dangers and banned the use of CFCs by 2010. A 1990 amendment included agreements to phase out the use of HCFCs by 2020 with production and import being eliminated by 2030. HFC refrigerants, which have a negligible impact on the ozone layer, were seen as viable replacements, but these too have a high impact on global warming. The Kigali amendment of 2016 calls for these HFCs to be cut back by 80% over the next 30 years. Natural refrigerants are one of the potential options for replacement of HFCs, and are growing in usage and popularity as a result. The natural refrigerant industry is expected to have a compounded annual growth rate of 8.5% over the next 4 years, and is expected to become a US$2.88 billion industry by 2027.

=== Sustainability metrics ===
Refrigerants are typically evaluated on both their global warming potential (GWP) and ozone depletion potential (ODP). The GWP scale is standardized to carbon dioxide, where the refrigerant's value is the multiple of the heat that would be absorbed by the same mass of carbon dioxide over a period of time. This is generally measured over a 100-year period. ODP measures the relative impact of a refrigerant to the ozone layer, standardized to R-11, which has a value of 1.

GWP and ODP vary greatly among the different refrigerants. CFCs are generally the highest impact, with a high GWP and ODP. HCFCs have similar GWP values and medium ODP values. HFCs again have similar GWP values but a zero ODP value. Natural refrigerants have low to zero GWP values and zero ODP values. Natural refrigerants are therefore gaining increased interest to replace HFCs and offer a more sustainable option for refrigeration.

ODP and GWP of Select Synthetic and Natural Refrigerants
Classification	Refrigerant	Ozone Depletion Potential	Global Warming Potential
CFC	R-12	1	10,900
CFC	R-502	0.33	4,657
HCFC	R-22	0.055	1,810
HCFC	R-123	0.06	77
HFC	R-23	0	14,800
HFC	R-32	0	675
Natural	R-170 (Ethane)	0	6
Natural	R-744 (Carbon Dioxide)	0	1
Natural	R-717 (Ammonia)	0	0
Natural	R-718 (Water)	0	0

== Refrigerants ==
=== Hydrocarbons as refrigerants ===
Pure hydrogen compounds see moderate use in refrigeration. Hydrocarbons are a viable option as refrigerants because, besides providing cooling properties, they are also plentiful and energy efficient. They are rated to be up to 50% more energy efficient than synthetic refrigerants. Hydrocarbons are also environmentally friendly, as they exist in nature and rank low on the global warming potential (GWP) scale. Historically, hydrocarbons have mainly seen use as a refrigerant for industrial chilling and refrigeration, but with the current shift towards natural refrigerants they are starting to see an increase in use in other areas of refrigeration. They are the favored refrigerant of many European countries.

Hydrocarbons used as refrigerants include:

- Methane (CH_{4}) [R-50]
- Ethane (CH_{3}CH_{3}) [R-170]
- Propane (CH_{3}CH_{2}CH_{3}) [R-290]
- Ethylene (CH_{2}CH_{2}) [R-1150]
- n-butane (CH_{3}CH_{2}CH_{2}CH_{3}) [R-600]
- Isobutane (CH(CH_{3})_{3}) [R-600a]
- Propylene (CH_{3}CHCH_{2}) [R-1270]
- Pentane (CH_{3}CH_{2}CH_{2}CH_{2}CH_{3}) [R-601]
- Isopentane (CH(CH_{3})_{2}CH_{2}CH_{3}) [R-601a]
- Cyclopentane ((CH_{2})_{5})

==== Flammability ====
The main detriment of using hydrocarbons as refrigerants is that they are extremely flammable at higher pressures. In the past, this risk was mitigated by turning hydrocarbons into CFCs, HCFCs, and HFCs, but with the increasing avoidance of such substances, the problem of flammability must be addressed. Refrigeration systems work by pressurizing the refrigerant to a point where it begins to display refrigerant properties, but with the risk of pressurizing hydrocarbons there is a higher level of caution needed for the internal pressure. In order for hydrocarbons to combust, there must first be a release of hydrocarbons which mix with the correct proportion of air, and then an ignition source must be present. The range of flammability for hydrocarbons lie between 1 and 10%, and an ignition source must have an energy greater than 0.25 J or a temperature greater than 440 °C.

Current safety measures regarding the usage of hydrocarbons are outlined by the Environmental Protection Agency (EPA). EPA guidelines of hydrocarbon usage as a refrigerant include specifically designating pressure ranges for hydrocarbon refrigerant systems, ensuring the removal of potentially fire-starting components from hydrocarbon refrigerant systems such as electrical components prone to sparking, and placing standards on the construction of the systems to ensure a higher level of safety. Installing ventilation such that the concentration in air would be less than the flammability limit and reducing the maximum charge size of the refrigerant are other viable safety measures. Technological advances to reduce the total refrigerant charge amount have been recently obtained using aluminum mini-channel heat exchangers.

==== Applications and uses ====
Hydrocarbon refrigerant markets have been growing as a result of increased concern for environmental effects of typical synthetic refrigerants. According to ASHRAE, available equipment that utilizes hydrocarbon refrigerant includes the following:

- Systems with small charges such as domestic refrigerators, freezers, and portable air conditioners
- Stand-alone commercial refrigeration systems including beverage and ice-cream machines
- Centralized indirect systems for supermarket refrigeration
- Transport refrigeration systems for trucks
- Chillers in the range of 1 kW – 150 kW

=== Carbon dioxide as a refrigerant (R-744) ===
Carbon dioxide has seen extensive use as a refrigerant. Carbon dioxide's main advantage as a refrigerant stems from the fact that it is classified as an A1 refrigerant by the EPA, placing it in the least toxic and hazardous category for refrigerants. This makes carbon dioxide a viable refrigerant for systems that are used in areas where a leak could cause exposure. Carbon dioxide sees extensive use in large-scale refrigeration systems, sometimes via a cascade refrigeration system. It is also used sparingly in automotive refrigeration, and is seen as favorable for uses in domestic, commercial and industrial refrigeration and air conditioning systems. Carbon dioxide is also both plentiful and inexpensive. These factors have led to carbon dioxide being used as a refrigerant since 1850, when it was patented for use as a refrigerant in the United Kingdom. Carbon dioxide usage at the time was limited due to the high pressures required for refrigerant properties to manifest, but these pressures can be easily reached and sustained with current pressurization technology.

The main concern over the use of carbon dioxide in refrigeration is the increased pressure required for carbon dioxide to act as a refrigerant. Carbon dioxide requires higher pressures to be able to condense within the cooling system, meaning that it has to be pressurized more than the other natural refrigerants. It can require up to 200 atmospheres to achieve adequate pressure for condensation. Refrigerant systems using carbon dioxide need to be built to withstand higher pressures. This prevents old coolant systems from being able to be retrofitted in order to use carbon dioxide. However, if carbon dioxide is used as a part of a cascade refrigeration system, it can be used at lower pressures. Using carbon dioxide in cascade refrigeration systems also means that the aforementioned benefits of availability and low price are applicable for a cascade system.

There are also benefits to the increased required pressures. Increased pressures yield higher gas densities, which allow for greater refrigerating effects to be achieved. This makes it ideal for cooling dense loads such as ones found in server rooms. It also allows for carbon dioxide to perform well under cold (-30 to -50 °C) conditions, since there are very small reductions in saturation temperatures for a given pressure drop. Plate freezers and blast freezers have noted improvements in efficiency and freezing time using carbon dioxide. There are also propositions for improved thermodynamic cycles to increase the efficiency of carbon dioxide at higher temperatures. Equipment with carbon dioxide refrigerant is also not necessarily heavier, bulkier, or more dangerous than similar equipment despite its higher working pressures due to reduced refrigerant volume flow rates.

When the pressure of carbon dioxide is raised above its critical point of 7.3773MPa it cannot be liquidized. Heat rejection must occur by cooling the dense gas, which creates a situation advantageous to water-heating heat pumps. These are particularly efficient with an incoming cold water supply.

=== Ammonia as a refrigerant (R-717) ===
Ammonia (NH_{3}) used as a refrigerant is anhydrous ammonia, which is at least 99.5% pure ammonia. Water and oil cannot exceed 33 and 2ppm respectively. Ammonia refrigerant is stored in pressurized containers. When the pressure is released it undergoes rapid evaporation causing the temperature of the liquid to drop until it reaches its boiling point of -33 °C (-28 °F), which makes it useful in refrigeration systems.

Ammonia has been used frequently in industrial refrigeration since it was first used in the compression process in 1872. It is used for its favorable thermodynamic properties, efficiency, and profitability. Ammonia is produced in massive quantities due to the fertilizer industry, making it relatively inexpensive. It has a GWP and ODP of zero, making the effect of ammonia leaks negligible on the climate. Ammonia is also tolerant to mineral oils and has low sensitivity to small amounts of water in the system. The vaporization heat of ammonia is high and the flow rate low, which requires different technologies to be used than other refrigerants. The low flow rate has historically limited ammonia to larger capacity systems.

One of the largest issues with ammonia usage in refrigeration is its toxicity. Ammonia is lethal in certain doses, but proper preparation and emergency protocols can mitigate these risks down to as little as one death per decade, according to the EPA. The unusual smell of ammonia is one reason for that, which allows humans to detect leaks at as low as 5ppm, while its toxic effects begin above 300ppm. Exposure of up to thirty minutes can also be handled without lasting health effects. As a result, much of the hazard with using ammonia as a refrigerant is actually just a matter of public perception. The main focus of safety measures is therefore to avoid fast increases in concentration to a public panic level. Flammability is also not of particular concern, since the flammability range is 15-28%, which would be detected far in advance. It is classified as 2L by ASHRAE for low flammability.

==== Applications and uses ====
Ammonia based refrigerant applications can include the following:

- Thermal storage systems
- HVAC chillers
- Process cooling
- Air conditioning
- Winter sports
- District cooling systems
- Heat pump systems
- Supermarkets
- Convenience stores
- Increasing output efficiencies for power generation facilities

Ammonia is expected to see increased use in HVAC&R industries as more officials become informed of its relative safety. It is already used in large heat pump installations and grocery stores, as well as in projects such as the International Space Station. Similar to carbon dioxide, ammonia can also be used in cascade refrigeration systems in order to improve the efficiency of the refrigeration process. There is an increasing use of cascade refrigeration systems that contain both ammonia and carbon dioxide. Absorption chillers with a water/ammonia mixture are also cost effective in some applications such as combined chilling, heat and power systems. Advancing technology also makes ammonia an increasingly viable option for small-scale systems.

=== Water as a refrigerant (R-718) ===
Water is nontoxic, nonflammable, has a zero GWP and ODP value, and has a low cost. Technical challenges, such as water's high specific volume at low temperatures, high pressure ratios required across the compressor, and high temperatures at the outlet of the compressor, exist as barriers to the use of water and water vapor as a refrigerant. Additionally, some applications can find issues with sediment build-up and bacterium breeding, although these issues can be minimized with techniques such as adding chemicals to fight the bacteria and softening the water used.

Water is commonly used at higher temperatures in lithium-bromide absorption chillers, but the coefficient of performance (COP) in these applications is just one fifth of typical electric drive centrifugal chillers. Vapor compression refrigeration cycles are a rare application but do have the potential to yield high COPs due to the thermophysical properties of water. Beyond absorption chillers, water can be used in desiccant dehumidification/evaporative cooling, adsorption chillers and compression chillers. Water has also been proposed to be used in special rotary compressors, although the dimensions and price of these systems can become very large.

In typical heat pump systems water can be an ideal refrigerant substance, with some applications yielding COPs that exceed 20. This makes it an obvious choice for industrial applications with temperatures above 80 °C. Water has also shown to be viable as a refrigerant in ground source heat pumps

Typical Brayton Cycle

=== Air as a refrigerant ===
Air is free, non-toxic, and does not negatively impact the environment. Air can be used as a refrigerant in air cycle refrigeration systems, which work on the reverse Brayton or Joule cycle. Air is compressed and expanded to create heating and cooling capacities. Originally, reciprocating expanders and compressors were used, which created poor reliability. With the invention of rotary compressors and expanders the efficiency and reliability of these cycles has improved, and alongside new compact heat exchangers makes air possible to compete with more conventional refrigerants.

=== Noble gases as refrigerants ===
The noble gases are rarely used as refrigerants. The primary uses of noble gases as refrigerants is in liquid super coolant experimental systems in laboratories or in superconductors. This specifically applies to liquid helium, which has a boiling point of 4.2 K. They are never used for industrial or home refrigeration.

=== Other natural refrigerants ===
These natural refrigerants are substances that can be used in refrigeration systems but are not used or are only used very rarely because of an availability of compounds that are either less expensive or are easier to handle and contain.

==== Oxygen compounds ====
- Diethyl ether/ethyl ether ("ether") (CH_{3}CH_{2}OCH_{2}CH_{3}) [R-610] (from dehydrogenation of ethanol; extremely flammable)
- Methyl formate (HCOOCH_{3}) [R-611] (from carbonylation of methanol, which usually both come from syngas; or by condensation of methanol; highly flammable)
- Dimethyl ether (CH_{3}OCH_{3}) [R-E170] (From dehydration of methanol which comes from syngas, natural gas or from some biofuels; highly flammable, medium toxicity)

==== Nitrogen compounds ====
- Methylamine (CH_{3}NH_{2}) [R-630] (from reaction of ammonia and methanol; medium toxicity; controlled substance)
- Ethylamine (CH_{3}CH_{2}NH_{2}) [R-631] (from reaction of ammonia and ethanol; very toxic)

== Lubricant ==
In refrigeration systems, oil is used to lubricate parts in the compressor to ensure proper function. In typical operations, some of this lubricant may inadvertently pass into another part of the system. This negatively impacts the heat transfer and frictional characteristics of the refrigerant. In order to avoid this, the lubricant oil needs to be sufficiently compatible and miscible with the refrigerant. CFC systems utilize mineral oils, however HFC systems are not compatible and need to rely on ester and polyalkylene-glycol based oils, which are significantly more expensive.

Hydrocarbons have a sign solubility with standard mineral oils, so very low solubility lubricants are needed. Polyalkylene Glycol and Polyalphaolefin are typically used in these systems for their low pour point and vapor pressures. Traditional oils cannot be used for lubricants in carbon dioxide systems since it is more solvent than most HFCs. Polyester oil is specifically designed to be used in carbon dioxide based systems and also helps to guard against increased bearing wear and maintenance costs that may come from a result of the higher stresses and pressures on a carbon dioxide system. Ammonia requires lubricants with low operating temperatures and high oxidation resistances, fluidity, and viscosity. Polyalphaolefin or Polyalphaolefin and Alkylbenzene blends are typically used.

== See also ==
- List of refrigerants
- Sustainable automotive air conditioning, also covering the Alliance for CO_{2} Solutions
- eurammon, a European non-profit initiative for natural refrigerants
