= Cooling capacity =

Measure of a cooling system's ability to remove heat

Cooling capacity is the measure of a cooling system's ability to remove heat. It is equivalent to the heat supplied to the evaporator/boiler part of the refrigeration cycle and may be called the "rate of refrigeration" or "refrigeration capacity". As the target temperature of the refrigerator approaches ambient temperature, without exceeding it, the refrigeration capacity increases thus increasing the refrigerator's COP. The SI unit is watt (W). Another unit common in non-metric regions or sectors is the ton of refrigeration, which describes the amount of water at freezing temperature that can be frozen in 24 hours, equivalent to 3.5 kW or 12,000 BTU/h.

== Formula ==
The basic SI units equation for deriving cooling capacity is of the form:

$$\dot{Q}=\dot{m}C_p\Delta T$$

Where

$\dot{Q}$ is the cooling capacity [kW]
$\dot{m}$ is the mass rate [kg/s]
$C_p$ is the specific heat capacity [kJ/kg K]
$\Delta T$ is the temperature change [K]
