= 1,1-Difluoroethylene =

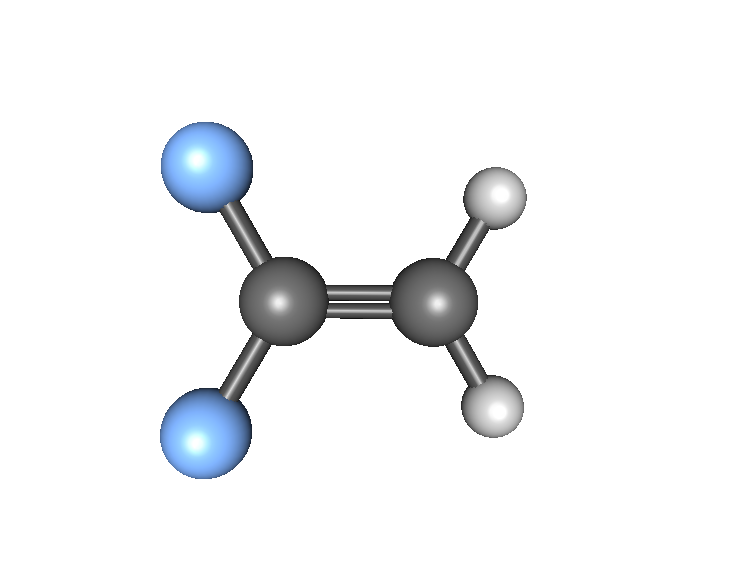

Names
- Preferred IUPAC name 1,1-Difluoroethene
- Other names Difluoro-1,1-ethylene; R-1132a; Halocarbon 1132 A; Freon 1132A; Vinylidene difluoride; Vinylidene fluoride

Identifiers
| CAS Number | 75-38-7 |
| 3D model (JSmol) | Interactive image |
| Abbreviations | VDF |
| ChEBI | CHEBI:82550 |
| ChEMBL | ChEMBL116020 |
| ChemSpider | 13836545 |
| ECHA InfoCard | 100.000.789 |
| EC Number | 200-867-7 |
| KEGG | C19547 |
| PubChem CID | 6369 |
| RTECS number | KW0560000 |
| UNII | 3C1IX2905B |
| UN number | 1959 |
| CompTox Dashboard (EPA) | DTXSID3021439 |
- InChI: InChI=1S/C2H2F2/c1-2(3)4/h1H2 Key: BQCIDUSAKPWEOX-UHFFFAOYSA-N; InChI=1/C2H2F2/c1-2(3)4/h1H2 Key: BQCIDUSAKPWEOX-UHFFFAOYAV
- SMILES: C=C(F)F

Properties
| Chemical formula | C_{2}H_{2}F_{2} |
| Molar mass | 64.035 g·mol^{−1} |
| Appearance | Colorless gas |
| Odor | Slightly ethereal |
| Density | 2.89 kg/m^{3} (vapor, 0 °C); 1.122 g/mL (liquid, −84 °C) |
| Melting point | −144 °C (−227 °F; 129 K) |
| Boiling point | −84 °C (−119 °F; 189 K) |
| Solubility in water | 0.254 g/L |
| Vapor pressure | 35.2 atm (20°C) |

Hazards
- Occupational safety and health (OHS/OSH)
| Main hazards | Flammable |
- GHS labelling
| Pictograms | (GHS07: Exclamation mark) |
| Signal word | Warning |
| Hazard statements | H315, H319, H335 |
| Precautionary statements | P261, P264, P271, P280, P302+P352, P304+P340, P305+P351+P338, P312, P321, P332+P313, P337+P313, P362, P403+P233, P405, P501 |
| Autoignition temperature | 380 °C (716 °F; 653 K) |
| Explosive limits | 5.5%-21.3% |
- NIOSH (US health exposure limits)
| PEL (Permissible) | none |
| REL (Recommended) | TWA 1 ppm C 5 ppm |
| IDLH (Immediate danger) | N.D. |

Related compounds
| Related compounds | 1,2-Difluoroethylene; Fluoroethylene; Trifluoroethylene; 2-Chloro-1,1-difluoroethylene; |
- Except where otherwise noted, data are given for materials in their standard state (at 25 °C [77 °F], 100 kPa). Infobox references

1,1-Difluoroethylene, also known as vinylidene fluoride, is a hydrofluoroolefin. This colorless, flammable gas is a difluorinated derivative of ethylene. Global production in 1999 was approximately 33,000 metric tons. It is primarily used in the production of fluoropolymers such as polyvinylidene fluoride and FKM.

== Preparation ==
1,1-Difluoroethylene can be prepared by elimination reaction from a 1,1,1-trihaloethane compound, for example, loss of hydrogen chloride from 1-chloro-1,1-difluoroethane:

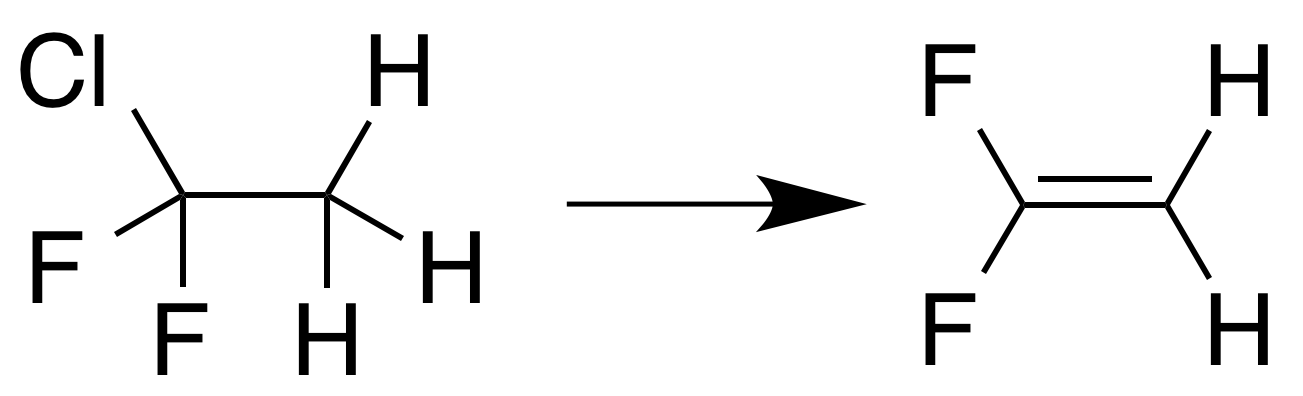

or loss of hydrogen fluoride from 1,1,1-trifluoroethane:

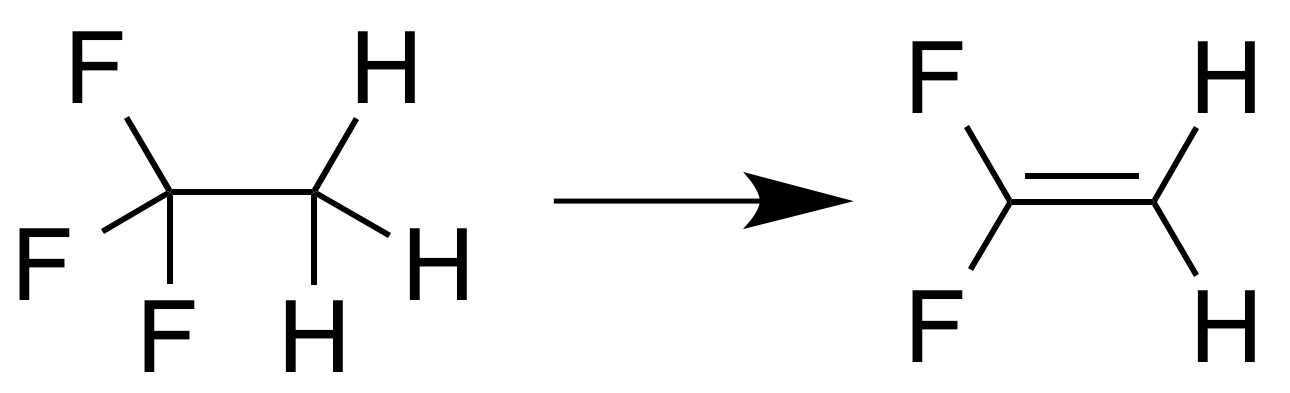

== See also ==
- 1,2-Difluoroethylene
- Perfluoroisobutene
