= Dust-Off =

Brand of compressed gas cleaner

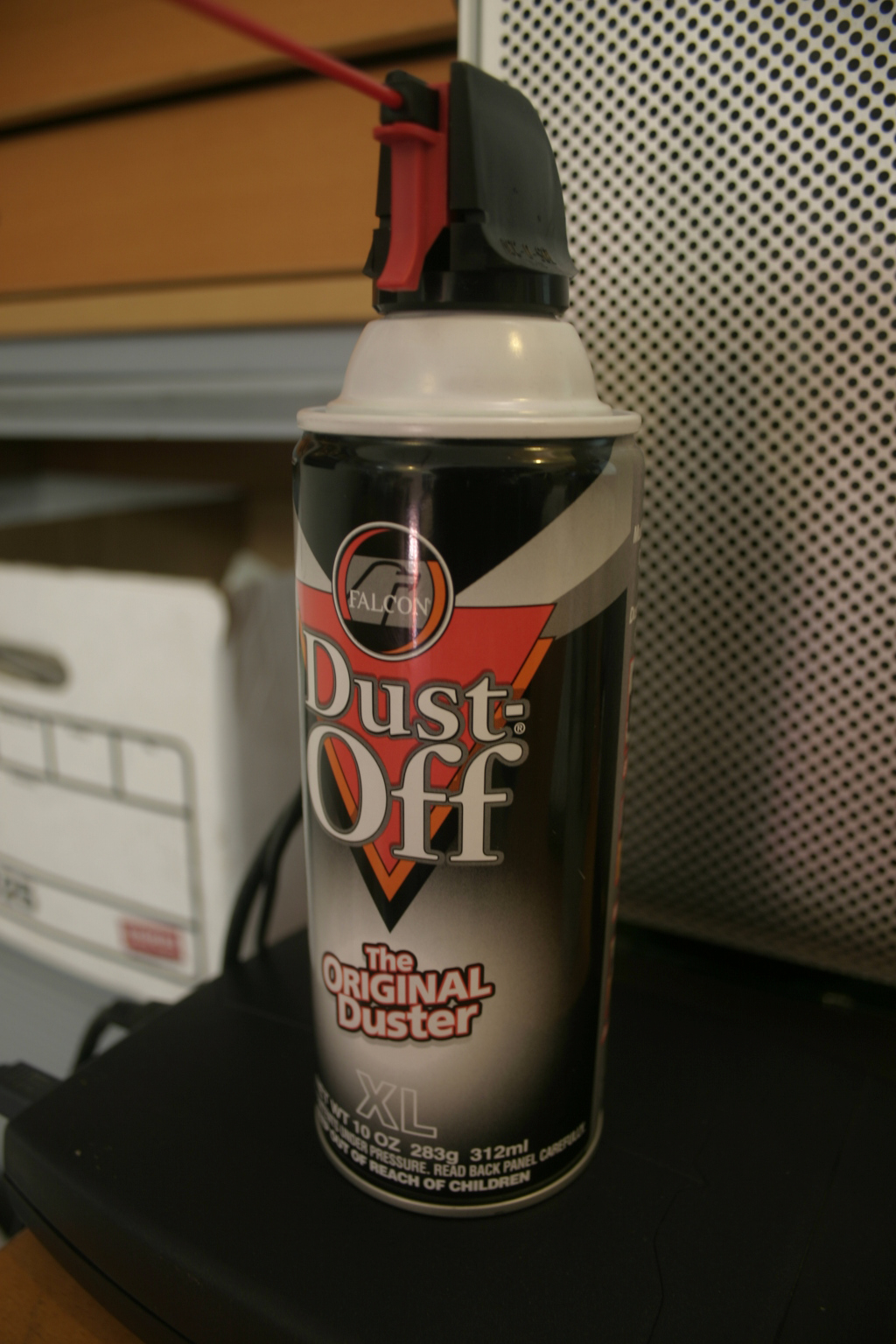
Dust-Off

Dust-Off is a brand of dust cleaner (refrigerant-based propellant cleaner, which is not compressed air and incorrectly called "canned air"). The product usually contains difluoroethane, although some use tetrafluoroethane and tetrafluoropropene as a propellant. It is used to blow particles and dust from computer, keyboards, photography equipment, and electronics, as well as many every day household items including windows, blinds, and collectibles. Dust-Off is manufactured by Falcon Safety Products located in Branchburg, NJ.

== History ==
Dust-Off was developed and introduced in 1970 by an employee at Falcon Safety Products who discovered that the pressurized blasts used to sound the alarm in the company's signal horns could also remove dust from photography equipment and film without having to touch the surface.

The Dust-Off compressed gas duster was first introduced to the photography market in 1970, and was marketed as a tool to blow foreign matter from photographic equipment and negatives that would not damage photographic prints during development. Due to the rise of personal computer use in the 1980s, Falcon developed Dust-Off II as a cleaning device to help rid damaging dust and lint from the new technology including screens, keyboards, CPU, and fans.

Recently, the Dust-Off brand has expanded to encompass a line of cleaners for electronic and home office equipment, with a large number of products dedicated to cleaning smartphones, tablets, PDAs, HD monitors, and TV screens. Products in the Dust-Off line include screen sprays and microfiber cleaning cloths.

== Inhalant abuse and efforts at deterrence ==
Difluoroethane is an intoxicant if inhaled, and is highly addictive. Compressed gas duster products gained attention for their abuse as inhalants, as used by teenagers in the movie Thirteen. A warning email circulated by Sgt. Jeff Williams, a police officer in Cleveland, whose son, Kyle, died after inhaling Dust-Off in Painesville Township, Ohio.

Wrestler Mike "Mad Dog" Bell died of an inhalation-induced heart attack brought on by an inhalation of difluoroethane in Dust-Off.

To deter inhalation, Falcon was the first duster manufacturer to add a bitterant to the product, which makes it less palatable to inhale but has not halted abuse. The company has also participated in inhalant abuse awareness campaigns with Sgt. Williams and the Alliance for Consumer Education to educate the public on the dangers of huffing, which includes the abuse of 1,400 different products. These efforts may have contributed to inhalant abuse being on a 10-year downward trend according to some indicators. Nevertheless 2011 data indicate that 11% of high school students report at least one incident of inhalant abuse.
