= Chlorodifluoroethane =

Chlorodifluoroethane has the following isomers:

- 2-Chloro-1,1-difluoroethane (R-142)
- 1-Chloro-1,2-difluoroethane (R-142a)
- 1-Chloro-1,1-difluoroethane (R-142b)
