= Polyvinylidene fluoride =

Thermoplastic fluoropolymer

Names
- IUPAC name Poly(1,1-difluoroethylene)
- Other names Polyvinylidene difluoride; poly(vinylene fluoride); Kynar; Hylar; Solef; Sygef; poly(1,1-difluoroethane)

Identifiers
CAS Number	24937-79-9
ChEBI	CHEBI:53250
ChemSpider	None
ECHA InfoCard	100.133.181
MeSH	polyvinylidene+fluoride
PubChem CID	6369
CompTox Dashboard (EPA)	DTXSID80895097

Properties
Chemical formula	−(C_{2}H_{2}F_{2})_{n}−
Appearance	Whitish or translucent solid
Melting point	177 °C (351 °F)
Solubility in water	Insoluble

Structure
Dipole moment	2.1 D

Related compounds
Related compounds	PVF, PVC, PTFE
- Except where otherwise noted, data are given for materials in their standard state (at 25 °C [77 °F], 100 kPa). verify (what is ?) Infobox references

Polyvinylidene fluoride or polyvinylidene difluoride (PVDF) is a highly non-reactive thermoplastic fluoropolymer produced by the polymerization of vinylidene difluoride. Its chemical formula is (C_{2}H_{2}F_{2})_{n}.

PVDF is a specialty plastic used in applications requiring the highest purity, as well as resistance to solvents, acids and hydrocarbons. PVDF has a lower density of 1.78 g/cm^{3} in comparison to other fluoropolymers, like polytetrafluoroethylene.

It is available in the form of piping products, sheet, tubing, films, plate and an insulator for premium wire. It can be injected, molded or welded and is commonly used in the chemical, semiconductor, medical and defense industries, as well as in lithium-ion batteries. It is also available as a cross-linked closed-cell foam, used increasingly in aviation and aerospace applications, and as an exotic 3D printer filament. It can also be used in repeated contact with food products, as it is FDA-compliant and non-toxic below its degradation temperature.

As a fine powder grade, it is an ingredient in high-end paints for metals. These PVDF paints have extremely good gloss and color retention. They are in use on many prominent buildings around the world, such as the Petronas Towers in Malaysia and Taipei 101 in Taiwan, as well as on commercial and residential metal roofing.

In biotechnology, PVDF membranes are used to immobilize proteins for a western blot.

PVDF is also used as a binder component for the carbon electrode in supercapacitors and for other electrochemical applications.

== Names ==
PVDF is sold under a variety of brand names including KF (Kureha), Hylar (Solvay), Kynar (Arkema) and Solef (Solvay).

== Synthesis ==
The easiest way of synthesizing PVDF is the radical polymerization of vinylidene fluoride (VF_{2}), however, the polymerization is not completely regiospecific. The asymmetric structure of VF_{2} leads to the orientation isomers during the polymerization. The configuration of the monomer in the chain can be either "head to head" or "head to tail".

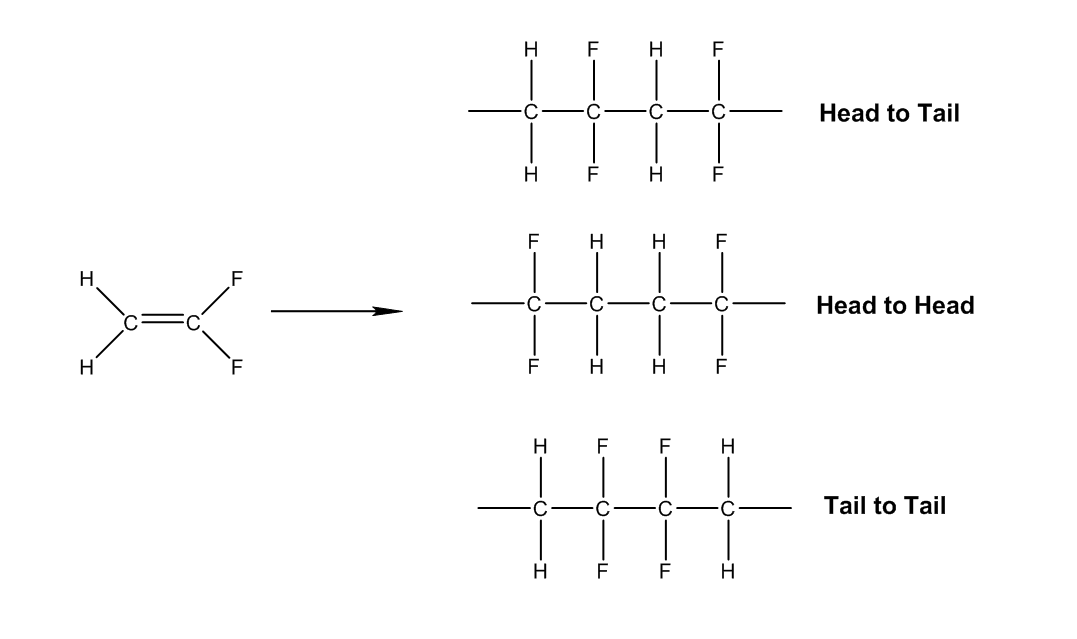
Figure 4: Three orientation isomers of polyvinylidene fluoride

To get more control on the regiospecific polymer synthesis, copolymerization was proposed. One of these methods is introducing the precursor polymer made from copolymerization of VF_{2} with either 1-chloro-2,2-difluoroethylene (CVF_{2}) or 1-bromo-2,2-difluoroethylene (BVF_{2}). The chlorinated or brominated monomers are attacked at their CF_{2} carbon by growing –CH_{2}CF_{2}∙ radical. After reductive dechlorination or debromination with tri-n-butyltin hydride they become a reversed VF_{2} unit in the final polymer. Therefore, a regioisomer of PVDF is formed.

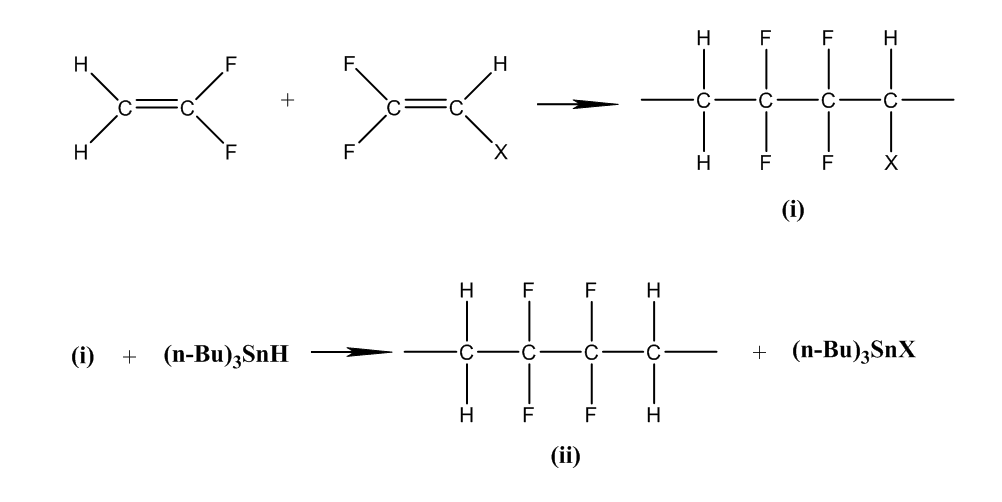
Figure 5: Scheme of regiospecific polymer synthesis

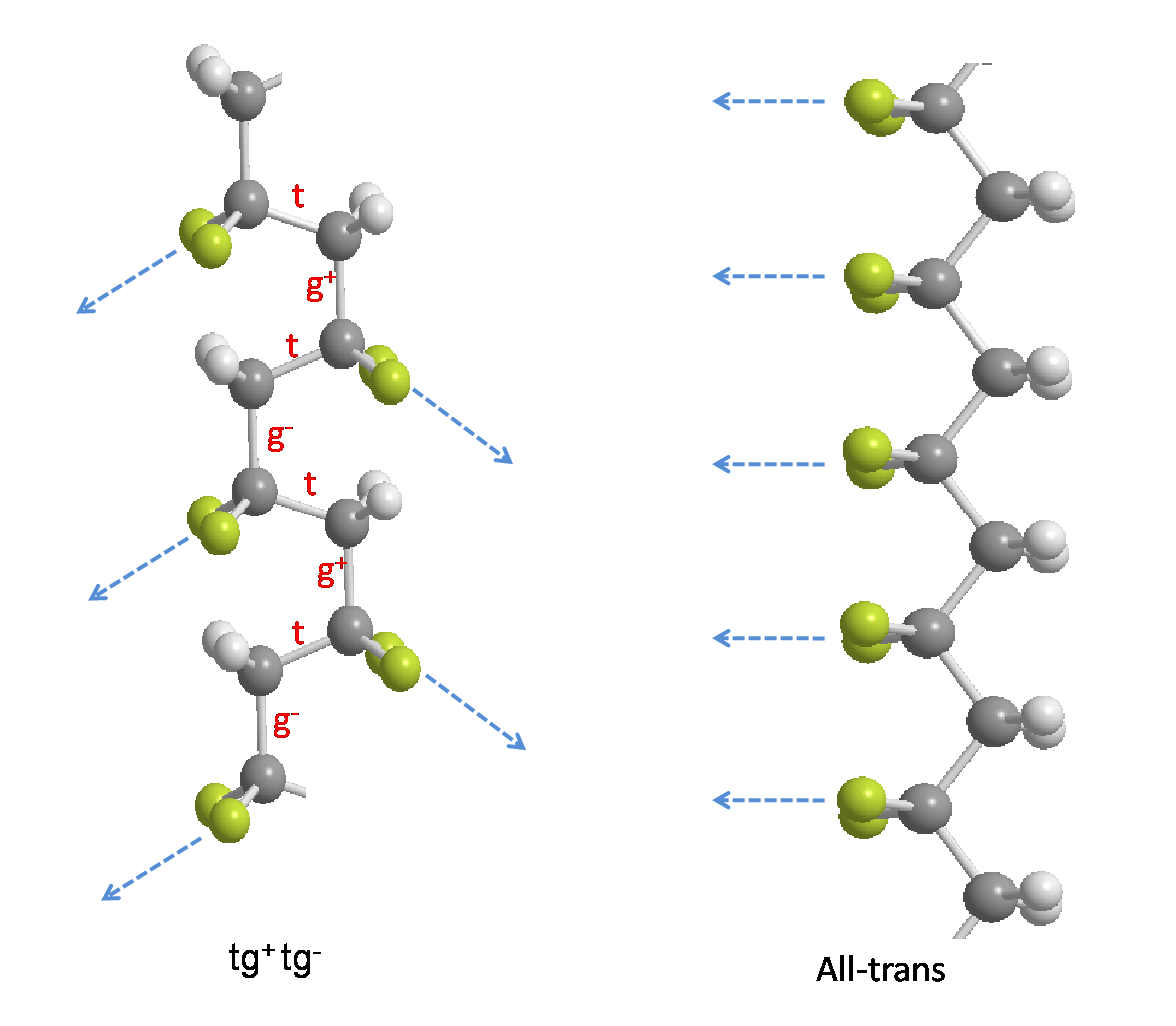
Figure 6: Schematic description of two most common conformations of PVDF, the left one is tg^{+}tg^{−} and the right one is all trans, the yellow sphere represents fluorine atom, the white sphere represents hydrogen atom and the grey sphere represents the carbon atom.

== Properties ==
In 1969, strong piezoelectricity was observed in PVDF, with the piezoelectric coefficient of poled (placed under a strong electric field to induce a net dipole moment) thin films as large as 6–7 pC/N: 10 times larger than that observed in any other polymer.

PVDF has a glass transition temperature (T_{g}) of about −35 °C and is typically 50–60% crystalline. To give the material its piezoelectric properties, it is mechanically stretched to orient the molecular chains and then poled under tension. PVDF exists in several phases depending on the chain conformations as trans (T) or gauche (G) linkages: TGTG' for α and δ phase, TTTT for β phases, and TTTGTTTG' for γ and ε phases. The α and ε conformations lack piezoelectric properties because of the antiparallel alignment of dipoles within its unit cell. The β, γ, and δ phases feature a parallel arrangement of dipoles, rendering them polar crystals with a non-zero dipole moment. Among these phases, the β phase stands out due to its remarkable remnant polarization and the highest dipolar moment per unit cell, garnering more interest compared to the others. When poled, PVDF is a ferroelectric polymer, exhibiting efficient piezoelectric and pyroelectric properties. These characteristics make it useful in sensor and battery applications. Thin films of PVDF are used in some newer thermal camera sensors.

Unlike other popular piezoelectric materials, such as lead zirconate titanate (PZT), PVDF has a negative d_{33} value. Physically, this means that PVDF will compress instead of expand or vice versa when exposed to the same electric field.

=== Thermal ===
Fluorinated polymers like PTFE and PVDF are especially thermally stable due to strong carbon-fluorine (C–F) bonds, the strongest in organic chemistry, which contribute to the durability of these materials under heat. PVDF is semi-crystalline, giving it a balance of rigidity and flexibility across temperatures from −35 °C to 160 °C. Above 316 °C, PVDF decomposes via dehydrofluorination, which can lead to structural changes, including double bonds and potential discoloration from thermal decomposition.

=== Chemical compatibility ===
PVDF exhibits an increased chemical resistance and compatibility among thermoplastic materials. PVDF is considered to have excellent / inert resistance to:

PVDF Resistance to Chemicals
Chemical	20 °C, 30 days	50 °C, 30 days
Organic Solvents
Acetone	3	3
Benzene	1	2
Chlorobenzene	1	1
Chloroform	1	1
Cyclohexane	1	1
Diethylene glycol	1	-
Dimethyl formamide (DMF)	-	-
Diethylamine	1	3
Dioxane	3	3
Ethyl acetate	1	2
Ethylene glycol	1	1
Glycerol	1	1
Naphthalene	1	1
Tetrahydrofuran (THF)	2	3
Trichloroethane	1	1
Xylol	1	1
Acids and Bases
Acetic acid (10%)	1	1
Acetic acid (100%)	1	1
Formic acid (10%)	1	1
Hydrochloric acid	1	1
Hydrogen peroxide (90%)	1	-
Lactic acid	1	2
Nitric acid (10%)	1	1
Nitric acid (Conc.)	2	2
Sulfuric acid (10%)	1	1
Sulfuric acid (90%)	1	1
Sulfuric acid (fuming/monohydrate)	3	3
Tetrahydrofuran	2	3
Trichlorofluoromethane	1	1
Zinc chloride (50%)	1	1
Zinc sulfate (50%)	1	1
Alcohols
Benzyl alcohol (pure)	1	1
Ethanol (30%)	1	1
Methanol	1	1
Methyl alcohol (10%)	1	1
Methyl alcohol (pure)	1	1
Phenol (10%)	1	1
Phenol (100%)	1	1
Propanol	1	1
Oils and Fats
Butyl acetate	1	2
Coconut oil	1	1
Pine oil	1	1
Mineral oils	1	1
Paraffin oil	1	1
Food Products
Milk	1	1
Glucose	1	3
Olive oil	1	1
Vinegar	1	2
Wine	1	1

Key: 1—Resistant, 2—Limited resistant, 3—Not resistant

=== Chemical sensitivity ===
PVDF, similar to other fluoropolymers, exhibits chemical sensitivity, in general, with the following chemical families:

- strong bases, caustics,
- esters,
- ketones.

=== Intrinsic properties and resistance ===
Polyvinylidene fluoride expresses inherent resistance characteristics in certain high-focus applications. Namely these are: ozone oxidation reactions, nuclear radiation, UV damage, and microbiological, fungus growth. PVDF's resistance to these conditions is fairly distinctive among thermoplastic materials. PVDF's carbon and fluoride elemental stability contributes to this resistance, as well as the polymeric integration of PVDF during its processing.

== Processing ==
PVDF may be synthesized from the gaseous vinylidene fluoride (VDF) monomer by a free-radical (or controlled-radical) polymerization process. This may be followed by processes such as melt casting, or processing from a solution (e.g. solution casting, spin coating, and film casting). Langmuir–Blodgett films have also been made. In the case of solution-based processing, typical solvents used include dimethylformamide and the more volatile butanone. In aqueous emulsion polymerization, the fluorosurfactant perfluorononanoic acid is used in anion form as a processing aid by solubilizing monomers. Compared to other fluoropolymers, it has an easier melt process because of its relatively low melting point of around 177 °C.

Processed materials are typically in the non-piezoelectric alpha phase. The material must either be stretched or annealed to obtain the piezoelectric beta phase. The exception to this is for PVDF thin films (thickness in the order of micrometres). Residual stresses between thin films and the substrates on which they are processed are great enough to cause the beta phase to form.

In order to obtain a piezoelectric response, the material must first be poled in a large electric field. Poling of the material typically requires an external field of above 30 megavolts per metre (MV/m). Thick films (typically >100 μm) must be heated during the poling process in order to achieve a large piezoelectric response. Thick films are usually heated to 70–100 °C during the poling process.

A quantitative defluorination process was described by mechanochemistry, for safe eco-friendly PVDF waste processing.

== Applications ==
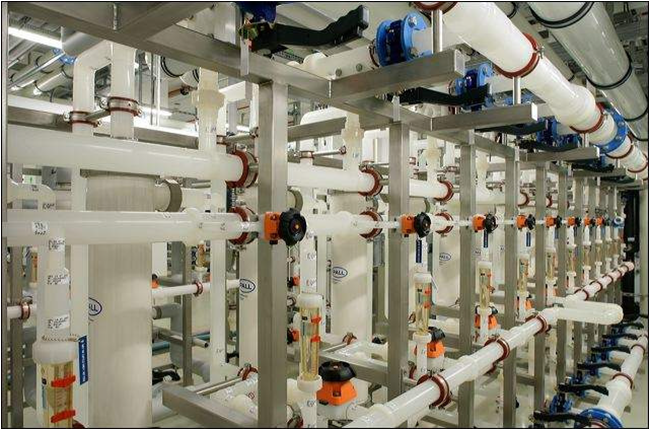
PVDF piping used to carry ultrapure water

PVDF is a thermoplastic that expresses versatility for applications similar to other thermoplastics, particularly fluoropolymers. PVDF resin is heated and handled for use in extrusion and injection molding to produce PVDF pipes, sheets, coatings, films, and molded PVDF products, such as bulk containers. Common industry applications for PVDF thermoplastics include:

- chemical processing,
- electricity, batteries and electronic components,
- construction and architecture,
- healthcare and pharmaceutics,
- biomedical research,
- ultra-pure applications,
- nuclear waste handling,
- petrochemical, oil and gas,
- food, beverage processing,
- water, wastewater management.

=== In electronics / electricity ===
PVDF is commonly used as insulation on electrical wires, because of its combination of flexibility, low weight, low thermal conductivity, high chemical corrosion resistance, and heat resistance. Most of the narrow 30-gauge wire used in wire wrap circuit assembly and printed circuit board rework is PVDF-insulated. In this use the wire is generally referred to as "Kynar wire", from the trade name.

The piezoelectric properties of PVDF are exploited in the manufacture of tactile sensor arrays, inexpensive strain gauges, and lightweight audio transducers. Piezoelectric panels made of PVDF are used on the Venetia Burney Student Dust Counter, a scientific instrument of the New Horizons space probe that measures dust density in the outer Solar System.

PVDF is the standard binder material used in the production of composite electrodes for lithium-ion batteries. Solution of PVDF 1−2% by mass in N-methyl-2-pyrrolidone (NMP) is mixed with an active lithium storage material such as graphite, silicon, tin, LiCoO_{2}, LiMn_{2}O_{4}, or LiFePO_{4} and a conductive additive such as carbon black or carbon nanofibers. This slurry is cast onto a metallic current collector, and the NMP is evaporated to form a composite or paste electrode. PVDF is used because it is chemically inert over the potential range used and does not react with the electrolyte or lithium.

=== In biomedical science ===
In the biomedical sciences, PVDF is used in immunoblotting as an artificial membrane (usually with 0.22 or 0.45-micrometre pore sizes), on which proteins are transferred using electricity (see western blotting). PVDF is resistant to solvents and, therefore, these membranes can be easily stripped and reused to look at other proteins. PVDF membranes may be used in other biomedical applications as part of a membrane filtration device, often in the form of a syringe filter or wheel filter. The various properties of this material, such as heat resistance, resistance to chemical corrosion, and low protein binding properties, make this material valuable in the biomedical sciences for preparation of medications as a sterilizing filter, and as a filter to prepare samples for analytical techniques such as high-performance liquid chromatography (HPLC), where small amounts of particulate matter can damage sensitive and expensive equipment.

PVDF transducers have the advantage of being dynamically more suitable for modal testing than semiconductor piezoresistive transducers and more compliant for structural integration than piezoceramic transducers. For those reasons, the use of PVDF active sensors is a keystone for the development of future structural-health monitoring methods, due to their low cost and compliance.

=== In high-temperature processes ===
PVDF is used as piping, sheet, and internal coatings in high-temperature, hot acid, radiation environment applications due to PVDF's resistance characteristics and upper temperature thresholds. As piping, PVDF is rated up to 248 °F (120 °C). Examples of PVDF uses include nuclear reactor waste handling, chemical synthesis and production, (sulfuric acid, common), air plenums, and boiler service pipe.

=== Other uses ===
PVDF is used for specialty monofilament fishing lines, sold as fluorocarbon replacements for nylon monofilament. The surface is harder, so it is more resistant to abrasion and sharp fish teeth. Its refractive index is lower than nylon, which makes the line less discernible to fish eyes. It is also denser than nylon, making it sink faster towards fish.

PVDF is used for specialty roofing coatings to improve UV resistance and increase roof color retention.

== Other forms ==
=== Copolymers ===
The copolymer Poly(vinylidene fluoride-co-hexafluoropropylene) or PVDF-HFP is used as a co-polymer in the blades of artificial turf. Addition of organoclay to PVDF-HFP via melt compounding stabilizes the β piezoelectric phase.

Copolymers of PVDF are also used in piezoelectric and electrostrictive applications. One of the most commonly used copolymers is P(VDF-trifluoroethylene), usually available in ratios of about 50:50 and 65:35 by mass (equivalent to about 56:44 and 70:30 molar fractions). Another one is P(VDF-tetrafluoroethylene). They improve the piezoelectric response by improving the crystallinity of the material.

While the copolymers' unit structures are less polar than that of pure PVDF, the copolymers typically have a much higher crystallinity. This results in a larger piezoelectric response: d_{33} values for P(VDF-TFE) have been recorded to be as high as −38 p C/N compared to −33 pC/N in pure PVDF.

=== Terpolymers ===
Terpolymers of PVDF are the most promising one in terms of electromechanically induced strain. The most commonly used PVDF-based terpolymers are P(VDF-TrFE-CTFE) and P(VDF-TrFE-CFE). This relaxor-based ferroelectric terpolymer is produced by random incorporation of the bulky third monomer (chlorotrifluoroethylene, CTFE) into the polymer chain of P(VDF-TrFE) copolymer (which is ferroelectric in nature). This random incorporation of CTFE in P(VDF-TrFE) copolymer disrupts the long-range ordering of the ferroelectric polar phase, resulting in the formation of nano-polar domains. When an electric field is applied, the disordered nano-polar domains change their conformation to all-trans conformation, which leads to large electrostrictive strain and a high room-temperature dielectric constant of ~50.

== Safety and regulations ==
PVDF is widely considered safe and ubiquitous used for water treatment, the food industry, and biocompatible devices like hernia meshes or internal devices. PVDF differs from PFAS in that alternating groups are hydrogen, making it less resilient to high temperatures, but also meaning that byproducts don't degrade into known hazardous PFAS. However, studies examining ecotoxity have shown that very high concentrations (up to 100 mg/L) may alter jellyfish behavior, while not being toxic to them. In the US, FDA regulations consider PVDF to be food safe, while US EPA water treatment regulations on PFAS have avoided placing limits on PVDF, while strictly limit concentrations of PFAS.

PVDF was added to the Living Building Challenge (LBC) Red List in 2022. The Red List bans substances prevalent in the building industry that pose serious risks to human health and the environment from construction that seeks to meet the criteria of the Living Building Challenge (LBC).

Proposed regulations in the EU aim to ban "any substance that contains at least one fully fluorinated methyl (-CF_{3}) or methylene (-CF_{2}-) carbon atom (without any H/Cl/Br/I attached to it)". Unless exemptions are made, the application of inconsistent and severe regulations may propose an existential risk to the industry.

== See also ==
- Ferroelectric polymers
- Ferroelectricity
- Pyroelectricity
