= Difluoroethene =

Difluoroethene or Difluoroethylene can refer to any one of several isomeric forms of the organochloride with the molecular formula C_{2}H_{2}F_{2}:

There are three isomers:

- 1,1-Difluoroethene
- 1,2-Difluoroethene (E and Z)

== See also ==
- Difluoroethane
- Dichloroethene
