= 1,1,2-Trifluoroethane =

Names
- Preferred IUPAC name 1,1,2-Trifluoroethane
- Other names HFC-143, R-143, asymmetrical trifluoroethane

Identifiers
CAS Number	430-66-0
3D model (JSmol)	Interactive image
ChemSpider	9506
ECHA InfoCard	100.006.425
EC Number	207-066-1
PubChem CID	9890
CompTox Dashboard (EPA)	DTXSID8073182
- InChI: InChI=1S/C2H3F3/c3-1-2(4)5/h2H,1H2 Key: WGZYQOSEVSXDNI-UHFFFAOYSA-N
- SMILES: C(C(F)F)F

Properties
Chemical formula	C_{2}H_{3}F_{3}
Molar mass	84.041 g·mol^{−1}
Appearance	colourless gas
Melting point	−84 °C (−119 °F; 189 K)
Boiling point	5 °C (41 °F; 278 K)

Related compounds
Related compounds	Trifluoroethylene; 1,1,1-trifluoroethane; 1,1,2-Trichloroethane; 1,1,2-Tribromoethane; 1,1,2-Triiodoethane
- Except where otherwise noted, data are given for materials in their standard state (at 25 °C [77 °F], 100 kPa). Infobox references

1,1,2-Trifluoroethane or R-143, is a hydrofluorocarbon with formula CH_{2}FCHF_{2}. It is a colourless gas at room temperature. It is an asymmetrical isomer of 1,1,1-trifluoroethane. 1,1,2-Trifluoroethane has a global warming potential of 397 for 100 years.

1,1,2-Trifluoroethane can be obtained by the hydrogenation of 1,2-dichlorodifluoroethylene or chlorotrifluoroethylene.

== See also ==
- 1,2-Dichloro-1,1,2-trifluoroethane
- 1,1,2-Trichloro-1,2,2-trifluoroethane
- 1,1,2-Trichloroethane
