= Gas duster =

Product used for dusting devices

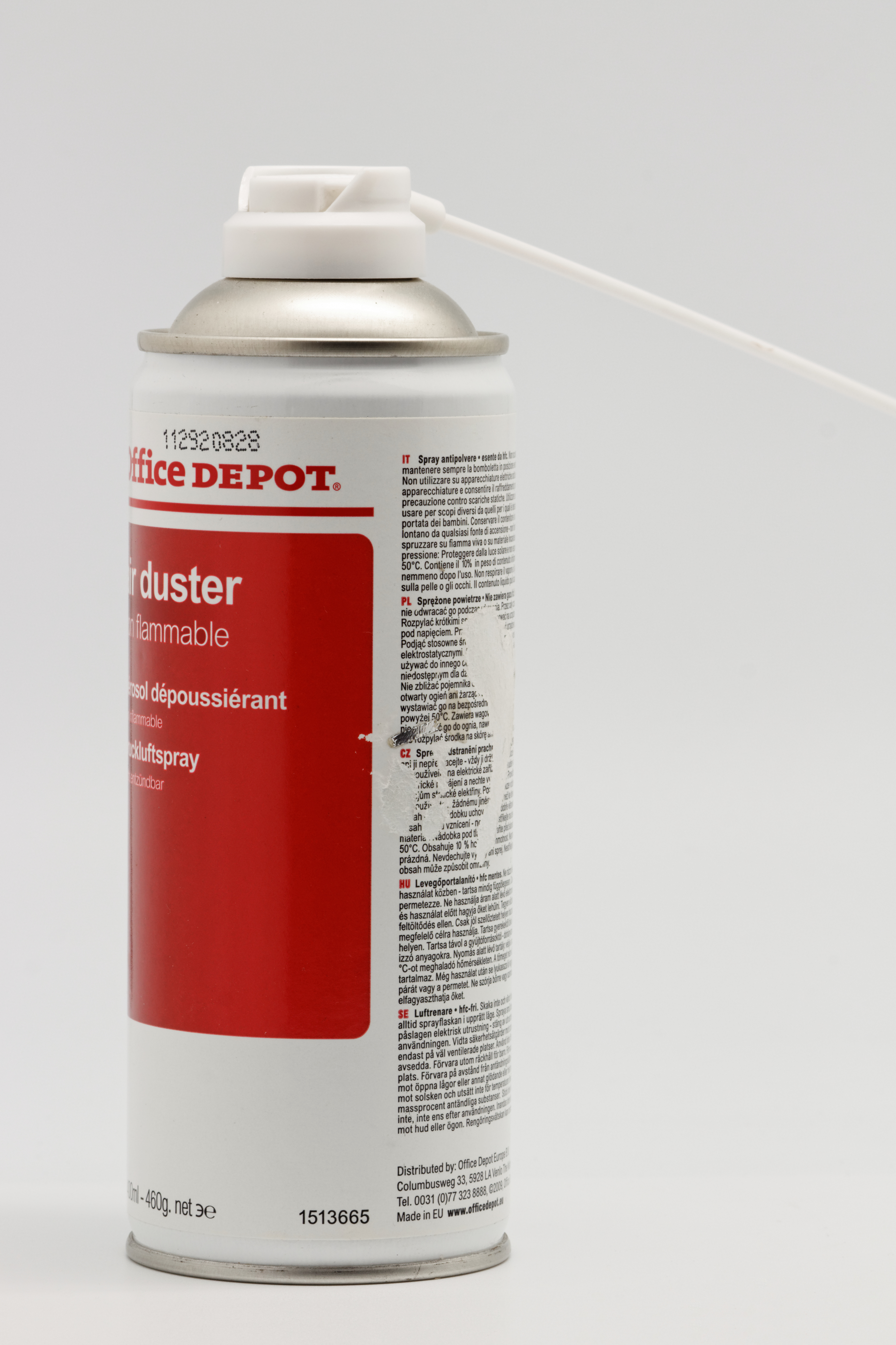
A gas duster can

A gas duster, also known as compressed air or canned air, is a product used for cleaning or dusting electronic equipment and other sensitive devices that cannot be cleaned using water.

This type of product is most often packaged as a can that, when a trigger is pressed, blasts a stream of compressed gas through a nozzle at the top. Despite the names "canned air" or "compressed air", the cans do not actually contain air (i.e. do not contain O_{2} or N_{2} gases) but rather contain other gases that are compressible into liquids. True liquid air is not practical, as it cannot be stored in metal spray cans due to extreme pressure and temperature requirements. Common duster gases include hydrocarbon alkanes, like butane, propane, and isobutane, and hydrofluorocarbons like 1,1-difluoroethane, 1,1,1-trifluoroethane, or 1,1,1,2-tetrafluoroethane which are used because of their lower flammability.

When inhaled, gas duster fumes may produce psychoactive effects and may be harmful to health, sometimes even causing death.

== History ==
The first patent for a unitary, hand-held compressed air dusting tool was filed in 1930 by E C Brown Co, listing Tappan Dewitt as the product's sole inventor. The patent application describes the product as a

Single-unit, i.e. unitary, hand-held apparatus comprising a container and a discharge nozzle attached thereto, in which flow of liquid or other fluent material is produced by the muscular energy of the operator at the moment of use or by an equivalent manipulator independent from the apparatus the spray being effected by a gas or vapour flow from a source where the gas or vapour is not in contact with the liquid or other fluent material to be sprayed, e.g. from a compressible bulb, an air pump or an enclosure surrounding the container designed for spraying particulate material.

== Uses ==
Gas duster can be used for cleaning dust off surfaces such as keyboards, as well as sensitive electronics in which moisture is not desired. When using gas duster, it is recommended to not hold the can upside down, as this can result in spraying liquid on to the surface. The liquid, when released from the can, boils at a very low temperature, rapidly cooling any surface it touches. This can cause mild to moderate frostbite on contact with skin, especially if the can is held upside down. Also, the can gets very cold during extended use; holding the can itself can result in cold burns.

A dust spray can often be used as a freeze spray. Many gas dusters contain HFC-134a (tetrafluoroethane), which is widely used as a propellant and refrigerant. HFC-134a sold for those purposes is often sold at a higher price, which has led to the practice of using gas dusters as a less expensive source of HFCs for those purposes. Adapters have been built for such purposes, although in most cases, the use of such adapters will void the warranty on the equipment they are used with. One example of this practice is the case of airsoft gas guns, which use HFC-134a as the compressed gas. Several vendors sell "duster adapters" for use with airsoft guns, though it is necessary to add a lubricant when using gas dusters to power airsoft guns.

== Health and safety ==
When inhaled, gas duster fumes may produce psychoactive effects and may be harmful to health, sometimes even causing death. Since gas dusters are one of the many inhalants that can be easily abused, many manufacturers have added a bittering agent to deter people from inhaling the product. Some U.S. states, as well as the UK, have made laws regarding the abuse of gas dusters, as well as other inhalants, by criminalizing inhalant abuse or banning the sale of gas dusters and other inhalants to those under 21. Because of the generic name "canned air", it is mistakenly believed that the can only contains normal air or contains a less harmful substance (such as nitrous oxide, for example). However, the gases actually used are denser than air, such as difluoroethane. When inhaled, the gas displaces the oxygen in the lungs and removes carbon dioxide from the blood, which can cause the user to suffer from hypoxia. Contrary to popular belief, the majority of the psychoactive effects of these inhalants is not a result of oxygen deprivation. The euphoric feeling produced stems from cellular mechanisms that are dependent on the molecular structure of the specific inhalant, as is the case with all psychoactive drugs. Their exact mechanisms of action have not been well elucidated, but it is hypothesized that they have much in common with that of alcohol. This type of inhalant abuse can cause a plethora of negative effects including brain and nerve damage, paralysis, serious injury, or death.

Since gas dusters are often contained in pressure vessels, they are considered explosively volatile.

== Environmental impacts ==
=== Global warming ===
1,1 Difluoroethane (HFC-152a), trifluoroethane (HFC-143a), and completely non-flammable tetrafluoroethane (HFC-134a) are potent greenhouse gases. According to the Intergovernmental Panel on Climate Change (IPCC), the global warming potential (GWP) of HFC-152a, HFC-143a, and HFC-134a are 124, 4470, and 1430, respectively. GWP refers to global warming effect in comparison to CO_{2} for unit mass. 1 kg of HFC-152a is equivalent to 124 kg of CO_{2}.

=== Ozone layer depletion ===
Gas dusters sold in many countries are ozone safe as they use "zero ODP" (zero ozone depletion potential) gases. For example, tetrafluoroethane has insignificant ODP. This is a separate issue from the global warming concern.

== Alternatives ==
True "air dusters" using ordinary air are also available in the market. These typically have much shorter run times than a chemical duster, but are easily refillable. Both hand pump and electric compressor models have been marketed. The maximum pressure for an aerosol can is typically 10 bar (145 psi) at 20 °C (68 °F). Therefore, a fully compressed air duster will exhaust air about 10 times the can volume.

Since 2008 electronic versions which only use air have gained popularity; particularly for professional and industrial use due to concerns about hazardous chemicals, environmental impact, potential for abuse and injury from freezing. Lately, battery powered versions for the consumer market have also gained popularity.

== See also ==
- List of cleaning products
- Freeze spray
