= Sources of electrical energy =

This article provides information on the following six methods of producing electric power.

1. Friction: Energy produced by rubbing two material together.
2. Heat: Energy produced by heating the junction where two unlike metals are joined.
3. Light: Energy produced by light being absorbed by photoelectric cells, or solar power.
4. Chemical: Energy produced by chemical reaction in a voltaic cell, such as an electric battery.
5. Pressure: Energy produced by compressing or decompressing specific crystals.
6. Magnetism: Energy produced in a conductor that cuts or is cut by magnetic lines of force.

== Friction ==
Friction is the least-used of the six methods of producing energy. If a cloth rubs against an object, the object will display an effect called friction electricity. The object becomes charged due to the rubbing process, and now possesses an static electrical charge, hence it is also called static electricity. There are two main types of electrical charge: positive and negative. Each type of charge attracts the opposite type and repels the same type. This can be stated in the following way: Like charges repel and unlike charges attract. Static electricity has several applications. Its main application is in Van de Graaff generators, used to produce high voltages in order to test the dielectric strength of insulating materials. Other uses are in electrostatic painting and sandpaper manufacturing. The course grains acquire a negative charge as they move across the negative plate. As unlike charges attract, the positive plate attracts the course grains and their impact velocity enables them to be embedded into the adhesive.

== Heat ==
In 1821 Thomas Seebeck discovered that the junction between two metals generates a voltage that is a function of temperature. If a closed circuit consists of conductors of two different metals, and if one junction of the two metals is at a higher temperature than the other, an electromotive force is created in a specific polarity. An example of this is in the case of copper and iron, the electrons first flow along the iron from the hot junction to the cold one. The electrons cross from the iron to the copper at the hot junction, and from the copper to the iron at the cold junction. This property of electromotive force production is known as the Seebeck effect. This effect is utilized in the most widely employed method of thermometry.

== Light ==
The sun's rays can be used to produce electrical energy. The direct user of sunlight is the solar cell or photovoltaic cell, which converts sunlight directly into electrical energy without the incorporation of a mechanical device. This technology is simpler than the fossil-fuel-driven systems of producing electrical energy. A solar cell is formed by a light-sensitive p-n junction semiconductor, which when exposed to sunlight is excited to conduction by the photons in light. When light, in the form of photons, hits the cell and strikes an atom, photo-ionisation creates electron-hole pairs. The electrostatic field causes separation of these pairs, establishing an electromotive force in the process. The electric field sends the electron to the p-type material, and the hole to the n-type material. If an external current path is provided, electrical energy will be available to do work. The electron flow provides the current, and the cell's electric field creates the voltage. With both current and voltage the silicon cell has power. The greater the amount of light falling on the cell's surface, the greater is the probability of photons releasing electrons, and hence more electric energy is produced.

== Chemical ==
Galvanic Cell

When a zinc electrode and copper electrode are placed in a dilute solution of sulfuric acid, the two metals react to each other's presence within the electrolyte and develop a potential difference of about 1 volt between them. When a conducting path joins the electrodes externally, the zinc electrode dissolves slowly into the acid electrolyte, The zinc molecule goes into the electrolyte in the form of positive ions while its electrons are left on the electrode. The copper electrode on the other hand does not dissolve in the electrolyte. Instead, it gives up its electrons to the positively charged ions of hydrogen in the electrolyte, turning them into molecules of hydrogen gas that bubble up around the electrode. The zinc ion combines with the sulfate ion to form zinc sulfate, and this salt falls to the bottom of the cell. The effect of all this is that the dissolving zinc electrode becomes negatively charged, the copper electrode is left with a positive charge, and electrons from the zinc pass through the external circuit to the copper electrode.

== Pressure ==
The molecules of some crystals and ceramics are permanently polarised: some parts of the molecule are positively charged, while other parts are negatively charged. These materials produce an electric charge when the material changes dimension as a result of an imposed external force. The charge produced is referred to as piezoelectricity. Many crystalline materials such as the natural crystals of quartz and Rochelle salted together with manufactured polycrystalline ceramics such as lead titanate zirconate and barium titanate exhibit piezoelectric effects. Piezoelectric materials are used as buzzers inside pagers, ultrasonic cleaners and mobile phones, and in gas igniters. In addition, these piezoelectric sensors are able to convert pressure, force, vibration, or shock into electrical energy. Being capable only of measuring active events, they are also used in flow meters, accelerometers and level detectors, as well as motor vehicles, to sense changes in the transmission, fuel injection and coolant pressure. When a voltage or an applied electric field stresses a piezo element electrically, its dimensions change. This phenomenon is known as electrostriction, or the reverse piezoelectric effect. This effect enables the element to act as a translating device called an actuator. Piezoelectric materials are used in power actuators, converting electrical energy into mechanical energy, and in acoustic transducers, converting electric fields into sound waves.

== Magnetism ==
The most useful and widely employed application of magnetism is in the production of electrical energy. The mechanical power needed to assist in this production is provided by a number of different sources. These sources are called prime movers, and include diesel, petrol and natural gas engines. Coal, oil, natural gas, biomass and nuclear energy are energy sources that are used to heat water to produce super-heated steam. Non-mechanical prime movers include water, steam, wind, wave motion and tidal current. These non-mechanical prime movers engage a turbine that is coupled to a generator. Generators that employ the principle of electro-magnetic induction carry out the final conversion of these energy sources. In order to do this, three necessary conditions must exist before a voltage is created by magnetism: movement, conductors and a magnetic field.

In accordance with these conditions, when a conductor or conductors move through a magnetic field to cut the lines of force, electrons are enabled to enter the conduction band thereby inducing an electric pressure for the production of alternating current in an external circuit. This may be referred to as an elementary alternator, consisting of a single wire loop called an armature with each end being attached to slip-rings and arranged so as to revolve midway between the magnetic poles. Two copper-graphite brushes connect with the external circuit on the slip-rings in order to collect the alternating current, generated in the conductor when the alternator is in operation. Another machine used for converting mechanical energy into electrical energy by means of electromagnetic induction is called a dynamo or direct current generator.

The key difference between an alternator and a generator is that the alternator delivers AC (alternating current) to the external circuit, while the generator delivers DC (direct current). In both machines alternating current is induced in the armature, but the type of current delivered to the external circuit depends on the way in which the induced current is collected. In an alternator, the current is collected by brushes bearing against slip-rings; in a generator, a form of rotating switch called the commutator is placed between the armature and the external circuit. The commutator is designed to reverse the connections with the external circuit at the instant of each reversal of induced current in the armature, producing rectified current or direct current. This rectified current is not pure like the current of a voltaic cell but is instead a pulsating current that is constant in direction and varying in intensity.
