= Freeze spray =

Aerosol spray for rapid cooling

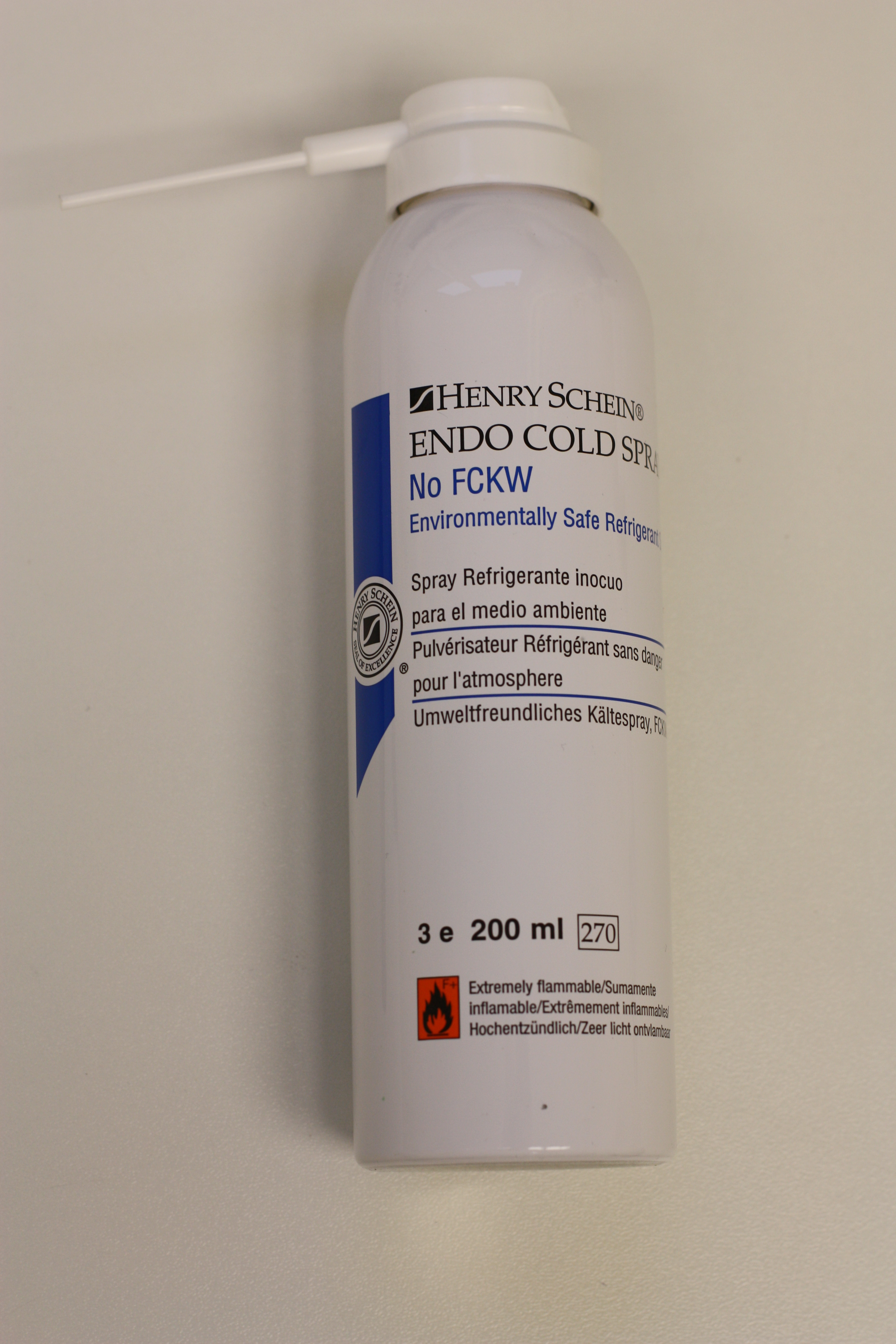
Spray containing propane, butane, and ethanol, for dental applications

Freeze spray (cold spray or vapocoolant) is a type of aerosol spray product containing a liquified gas used for rapidly cooling surfaces, in medical and industrial applications. It is usually sold in hand-held spray cans. It may consist of various substances, which produce different temperatures, depending on the application.

Some of them are highly flammable. Several other types of compressed gas sprays also have a freezing effect: for example, tetrafluoroethane, gas dusters, liquid nitrogen, and carbon dioxide fire extinguishers.

== Applications ==
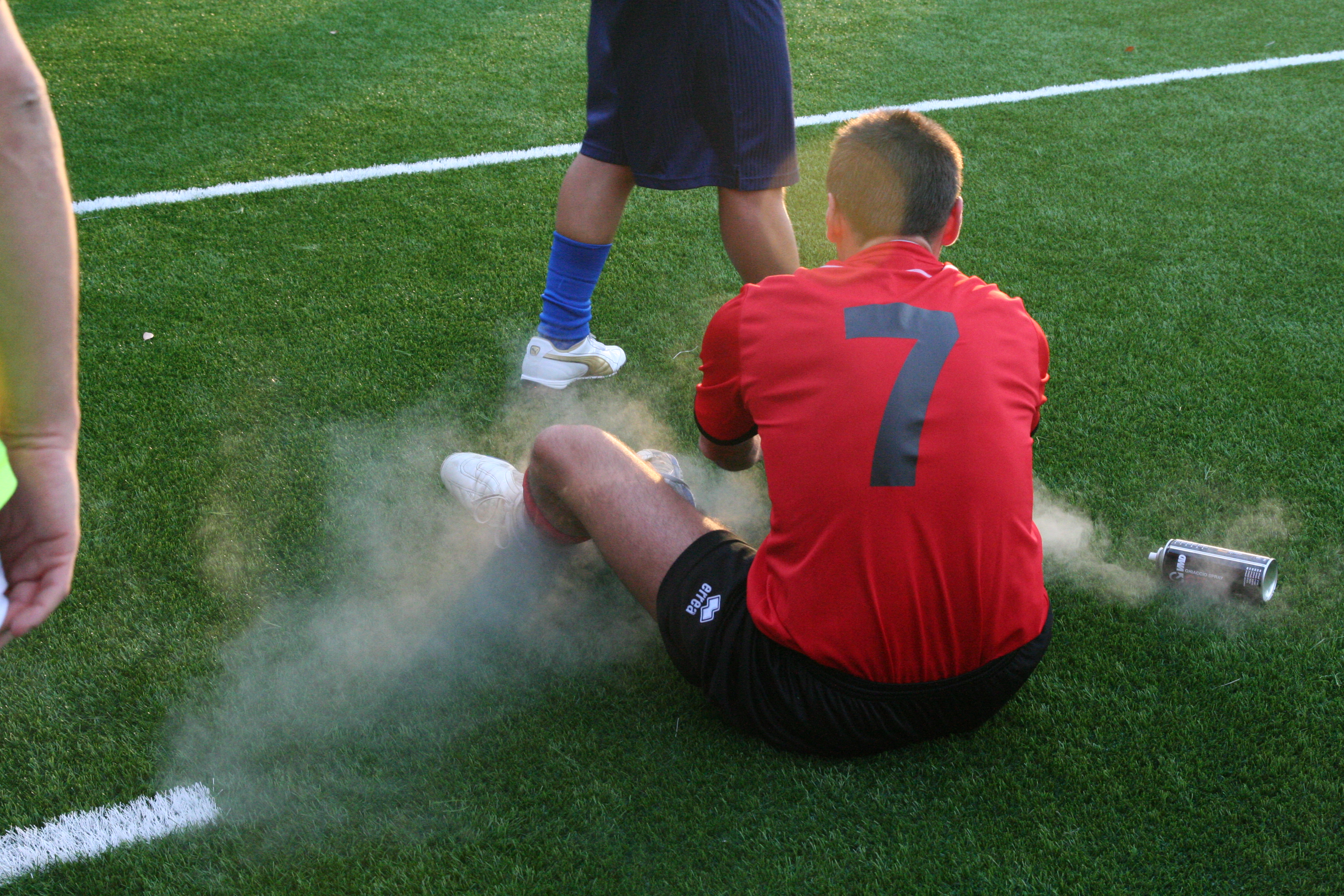
"Magic" ice spray used to treat a sports injury

=== Industrial ===
For spot-cooling of electronic components during troubleshooting, dimethyl ether or tetrafluoroethane may be used.

Freeze sprays are also used to contract metal for assembly or disassembly of interference fit parts.

The extreme temperature can cause viscoelastic materials to change to glass phase. Thus it is useful for removing many types of pressure sensitive adhesives.

=== Medical ===
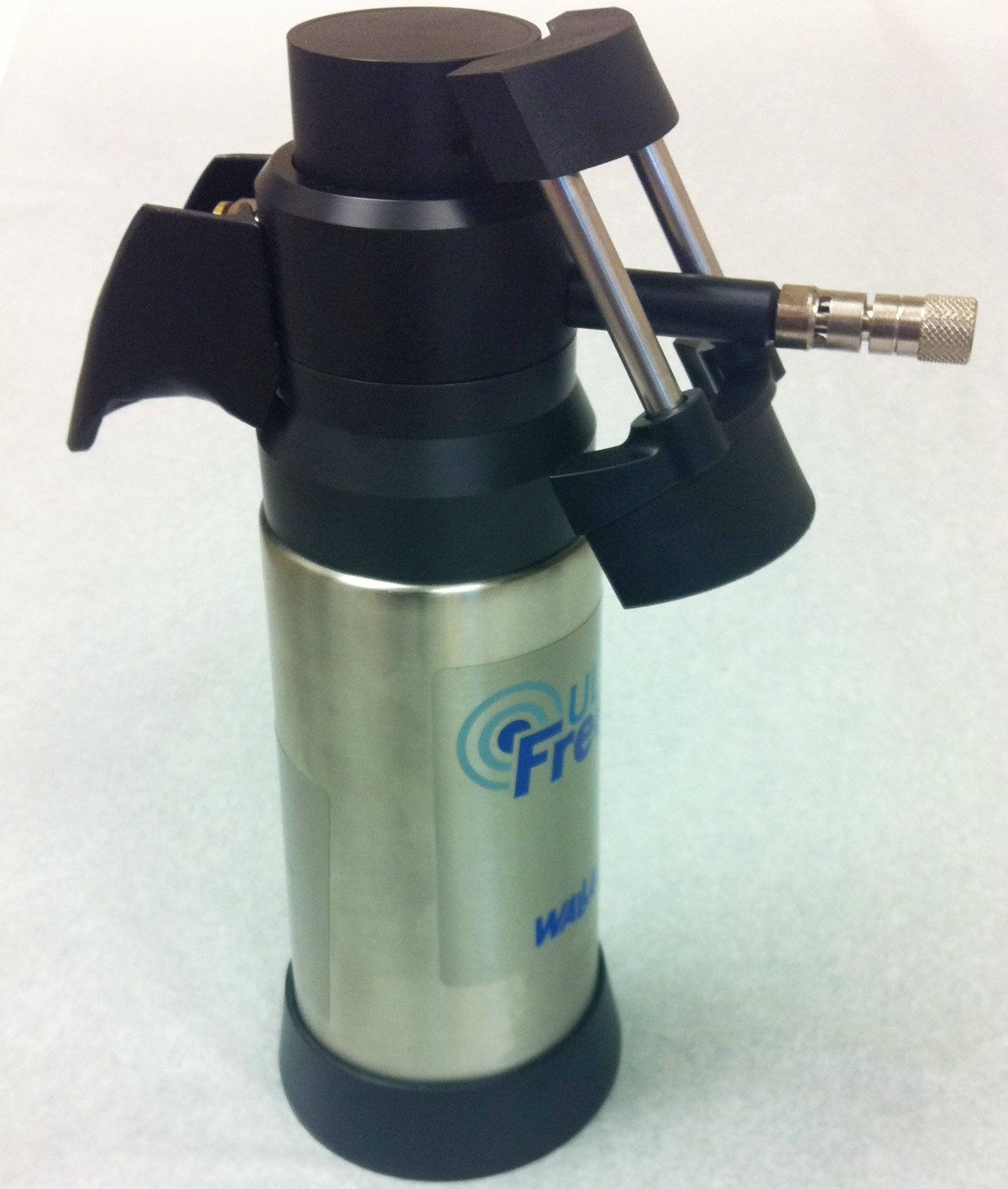
Medical cryotherapy gun with liquid nitrogen

In medical applications, spray cans containing dimethyl ether or tetrafluoroethane may also be used to freeze and destroy tissue, for removal of warts and skin tags, or other uses in cryosurgery. Liquified petroleum gas including propane and butane is sometimes used. These all may also be used as a topical anesthetic, due to the numbing effect of cold, though there is risk of frostbite.

Cold sprays are sometimes used to carefully freeze and kill attached ticks, with successful application often resulting in the dead tick falling off.

Chloroethane may be used as a topical pain reliever, and an alternative to ice pack therapy to reduce inflammation and swelling. Since its boiling point is well above the freezing point of water, there is less risk of freezing the skin, though it can still be dangerous if misused. It may be used to treat sports injuries, where it is sometimes known as ice spray or magic spray.

Freeze sprays are also utilized in frozen section biopsies to rapidly cool or freeze small tissue samples at the microtome or cryostat.

=== Other ===
Freeze spray has been shown useful for the field marking of animals; for example marking the tails of monkeys. Research is continuing to help control the application dosage and time to minimize permanent damage to the animals.

== See also ==
- Gas duster
