= Trifluoroethane =

Trifluoroethane may refer to either of two isomeric fluorocarbons which differ by the location of attachment of the fluorine atoms:

- 1,1,2-Trifluoroethane (R-143)
- 1,1,1-Trifluoroethane (R-143a)

Both are used as refrigerant and propellant gases.
