= Dust off =

Dust off may refer to:

- Dustoff or casualty evacuation, the emergency evacuation of casualties from a combat zone
- Dust-Off, cleaning utensil
