= R134 =

R134, R 134, or R-134 may refer to:

- R-134 (hydrofluorocarbon), or 1,1,2,2-tetrafluoroethane, a chemical
- R134 (star), a star in the Tarantula Nebula; see list of most massive stars and list of most luminous stars
- R134, an R boat, a German naval vessel built during the Second World War
