= Falcon Safety Products =

American cleaning supply and gaming accessory manufacturer

Falcon Safety Products, Inc. is a manufacturer of gas dusters (Dust-Off), horns, computer related cleaning supplies and gaming accessories. The family-owned company operates in the United States and the United Kingdom, with its headquarters in Branchburg, New Jersey. The company was founded in 1953.

== Key Executives ==
- Phil Lapin – Chief Executive Officer and President
- Gregory Mas- Executive Vice President – Finance, Operations & International Sales
- Michael Genner – Sales Director of Falcon UK
- Steve Smith - Senior Vice President of Sales
- Jen Rappaport- Marketing Manager

== Products ==
The company produces a variety of compressed gas lint, debris and dust removers for computers, keyboards and other equipment. They also offer screen cleaning wipes and cloths.

== Critique ==
The company has been included as part of a class action regarding its Dust-off, and Century, Maxell and Insignia dusters. The aerosol inhalant abuse case was filed by the estate of Michael Robins, an inhalant abuser whose death was attributed to sudden sniffing death syndrome and difluoroethane toxicity.
