= Nickel niobate =

Complex oxide based on nickel and niobium

Names
- Other names Nickel niobium oxide

Identifiers
| CAS Number | 12059-60-8 |
| 3D model (JSmol) | Interactive image |
| PubChem CID | 173095412 |
- InChI: InChI=1S/2Nb.Ni.6O/q;;+2;;;;;2*-1 Key: DKNMCUHNFSYQNE-UHFFFAOYSA-N
- SMILES: [Ni+2].O=[Nb](=O)[O-].O=[Nb](=O)[O-]

Properties
| Chemical formula | Nb_{2}NiO_{6} |
| Molar mass | 340.50256 g/mol |
| Appearance | Yellow powder |

Hazards
- GHS labelling
| Pictograms | (GHS07: Exclamation mark) (GHS08: Health hazard) (GHS09: Environmental hazard) |
| Signal word | Danger |
| Hazard statements | H302, H315, H317, H319, H334, H341, H350, H360, H372, H412 |
| Precautionary statements | P202, P260, P264, P270, P271, P272, P273, P280, P284, P301+P312, P302+P352, P304+P340, P305+P351+P338, P308+P311, P342+P311, P362+P364, P405, P501 |
- Except where otherwise noted, data are given for materials in their standard state (at 25 °C [77 °F], 100 kPa). Infobox references

Nickel niobate is a complex oxide which as a solid material has found potential applications in catalysis and lithium batteries.

== Complexes ==
Nickel niobate has been added to other elements forming bismuth nickel niobate (Bi_{2}O_{3}-NiO-Nb_{2}O_{5}), providing a dense ceramic body at low sintering temperatures. Cubic pyrochlore, tetragonal pyrochlore, and other unknown phases were found.

Single-phase perovskite ceramics of Pb(Ni_{1/3}Nb_{2/3})O_{3} (PNN) have been prepared by the columbite precursor method. Dielectric studies showed that ceramic Pb(Ni_{1/3}Nb_{2/3})O_{3} is a typical relaxor ferroelectric with properties like those of its single-crystals.

== Applications ==
Nickel niobate has been examined for use as a catalyst to reduce 4-nitrophenol due to a photo-synergistic effect that exploits the synergy between thermal active sites and photogenerated electrons.

Nickel niobate has also been examined in an "open and regular" crystalline form for use as the anode in a lithium ion battery. It forms a porous, nano-scale structure that eliminates the dendrite formation that can cause short circuits and other problems. The material offers energy density of 244 mAh g−1 and retains 80%+ of its capacity across 20k cycles. The manufacturing process is straightforward and does not require a clean room. The anode offers a diffusion coefficient of 10−12 cm2 s−1 at 300 K, which allows fast charging/dischargine at high current densities, yielding capacities of 140 and 50 mAh g−1 for 10 and 100C respectively.
