= 2-Chloro-1,1-difluoroethane =

Names
- Preferred IUPAC name 2-Chloro-1,1-difluoroethane
- Other names R-142; HCFC-142

Identifiers
CAS Number	338-65-8
3D model (JSmol)	Interactive image
ChemSpider	2018165
ECHA InfoCard	100.214.711
EC Number	688-133-6
PubChem CID	2736499
UNII	49430BPM5B
CompTox Dashboard (EPA)	DTXSID0073164
- InChI: InChI=1S/C2H3ClF2/c3-1-2(4)5/h2H,1H2 Key: ATEBGNALLCMSGS-UHFFFAOYSA-N
- SMILES: C(C(F)F)Cl

Properties
Chemical formula	C_{2}H_{3}ClF_{2}
Molar mass	100.49 g·mol^{−1}
Boiling point	35.1 °C (95.2 °F; 308.2 K)

Related compounds
Related compounds	2-Chloro-1,1-difluoroethylene, 1-Chloro-1,2-difluoroethane, 1-Chloro-1,1-difluoroethane
- Except where otherwise noted, data are given for materials in their standard state (at 25 °C [77 °F], 100 kPa). Infobox references

2-Chloro-1,1-difluoroethane (HCFC-142) is a haloalkane and a hydrochlorofluorocarbon. It is produced as a byproduct of the production of 1-chloro-1,1-difluoroethane (HCFC-142b). According to a 2022 report by the WMO and other agencies, it has an ODP of 0.019 and a 100-year GWP of 189.
