= PVF =

PVF may refer to:

- PVF Football Academy
- Polyvinyl fluoride
- Pro Volleyball Federation
