= Dichloroethane =

Dichloroethane can refer to either of two isomeric organochlorides with the molecular formula C_{2}H_{4}Cl_{2}:

- 1,1-Dichloroethane (ethylidene chloride)
- 1,2-Dichloroethane (ethylene dichloride)

== See also ==
- Dichloroethene
- Difluoroethane
