= 2-Chloro-1,1-difluoroethylene =

Names
- Preferred IUPAC name 2-Chloro-1,1-difluoroethene

Identifiers
CAS Number	359-10-4
3D model (JSmol)	Interactive image
ChemSpider	9283
ECHA InfoCard	100.006.024
EC Number	206-625-7
PubChem CID	9664
UNII	QGF1P560AW
CompTox Dashboard (EPA)	DTXSID3073898
- InChI: InChI=1S/C2HClF2/c3-1-2(4)5/h1H Key: HTHNTJCVPNKCPZ-UHFFFAOYSA-N
- SMILES: C(=C(F)F)Cl

Properties
Chemical formula	C_{2}HClF_{2}
Molar mass	98.48 g·mol^{−1}
Melting point	−138.5 °C (−217.3 °F; 134.7 K)
Boiling point	−17.7 °C (0.1 °F; 255.5 K)

Related compounds
Other anions	2-Bromo-1,1-difluoroethene
Related compounds	1-Chloro-1,2-difluoroethene (Z) and (E) isomers (R 1122a);
- Except where otherwise noted, data are given for materials in their standard state (at 25 °C [77 °F], 100 kPa). Infobox references

2-Chloro-1,1-difluoroethene (also known as R 1122, u-HCFC-1122 or HCFO-1122) is a toxic unsaturated hydrochlorofluorocarbon which can be written as CF_{2}=CHCl. The HCFO portion of the name stands for hydrochlorofluoroolefin. Another constitutional isomer of it, 1-chloro-1,2-difluoroethylene, is known as HCFO-1122a.

== Formation ==
One way to make HCFO-1122 by way of dehydrochlorination, is to heat HCFC-132b to 600 °C, preferably with some carbon tetrachloride to get a 70% yield.

CH_{2}ClCClF_{2} → CHCl=CF_{2} + HCl

A lower yield results if HCFC-132a (1,1-dichloro-2,2-difluoroethane) is used:

CHCl_{2}CHF_{2} → CHCl=CF_{2} + HCl

When trying to make HFC-134a from HCFC-133a, some HCFO-1122 is produced as a side product by way of dehydrofluorination.

CF_{3}CH_{2}Cl → CHCl=CF_{2} + HF (low yield)

== Properties ==
=== Shape and size ===
2-Chloro-1,1-difluoroethene has a flat shape with all atoms in the same plane. The two fluorine atoms can be distinguished by whether one is closer to hydrogen or chlorine F(H) or F(Cl). The bond lengths are: C=C 1.303 Å, C-F(H) 1.321 Å, C-F(Cl) 1.320 Å, C-Cl 1.731 Å, C-H 1.083 Å. For bond angles: ∠CCF(H) 123.4°, ∠CCF(Cl) 126.1°, ∠CCH 128.3°, ∠CCCl 121°.

=== Spectrum ===
The infrared spectrum includes strong absorption bands at v_{10} at 751.1 cm^{−1}, v_{5} at 971.5 and 970.2 cm^{−1}, v_{4} at 1200.7 cm^{−1}, v_{3} at 1341.7 cm^{−1}, and v_{2} at 1747.5 cm^{−1}. Weaker absorption bands are at v7 at 578.0 and 577.4 cm^{−1}, v6 at 844.9and 842.8 cm^{−1} and v1 at 3135.9 cm^{−1}. An estimate for radiative forcing potential is 0.098 W m^{2} ppbv^{−1} and global warming potential is between 1.5 and 4.5 on 100 year time frame. The lifetime in Earth's atmosphere is only 10 to 30 days mitigating the effect of pollution.

== Occurrence ==
2-Chloro-1,1-difluoroethene may be a contaminant in HFC-134a. It can form by the elimination of HCl or HF from other HCFCs such as HCFC-133a:

CF_{3}CH_{2}Cl → CF_{2}=CHCl + HF

It can be removed from the mixture by various physical processes such as absorption, or chemical processes, that fluorinate, reduce or oxidize it. An example specification for medical use of HFC-134a requires under 5 ppm of HCFC-1122.

Humans that have been anesthetized by halothane, convert some in the body to 2-chloro-1,1-difluoroethene and then exhale it.

== Reactions ==
When irradiated by ultraviolet light at 192 nm, 2-Chloro-1,1-difluoroethene splits off hydrogen chloride to make a carbene: (difluorovinylidene) CF_{2}=CHCl → CF_{2}=C: + HCl. Difluorovinylidene does not convert to difluoroacetylene (FC≡CF), but instead survives and reacts with other molecules. Also HF can be eliminated to yield chlorofluoroacetylene (ClC≡CF).

2-Chloro-1,1-difluoroethene can be removed from HFC-134a by oxidation with potassium permanganate. Alternately oxidation can occur with hydrogen peroxide. Fluoridation can occur with HF with a chromium trioxide catalyst, producing CF_{3}CH_{2}Cl. With fluorine around −60°C it forms CF_{3}CHClF.

An argon complex with the molecule is known. The argon atom is out of the plane of the other atoms, on the side with the chlorine atom.

When it is heated with cyclopentadiene at 170 °C, bicyclic norbornene derivatives are produced.

Wen heated with hydrogen, it is dechlorinated, and becomes the saturated 1,1-difluoroethane.

Trichlorosilane reacts by adding across the double bond, mostly yielding trichloro-(2,2-difluoroethyl)silane. As 2-chloro-1,1-difluoroethene levels increase, more of trichloro-(2-chloro-2,2-difluoroethyl)silane and trichloro-(2-chloro-1,1-difluoroethyl)silane are produced.

== Use ==
2-Chloro-1,1-difluoroethene is an intermediate in the manufacture of fluorosurfactants, fluorine-containing textile finishing agents, organic silicon fluorine modified resins and other fine chemicals containing fluorine.
