= Polyvinyl fluoride =

Names
- IUPAC name poly(1-fluoroethylene)
- Other names poly(vinyl fluoride)

Identifiers
CAS Number	24981-14-4
Abbreviations	PVF
ChEBI	CHEBI:53244
ChemSpider	none
MeSH	polyvinyl+fluoride
CompTox Dashboard (EPA)	DTXSID601009764

Properties
Chemical formula	(C_{2}H_{3}F)_{n}
- Except where otherwise noted, data are given for materials in their standard state (at 25 °C [77 °F], 100 kPa). Infobox references

Polyvinyl fluoride (PVF) or –(CH_{2}CHF)_{n}– is a polymer material mainly used in the flammability-lowering coatings of airplane interiors and photovoltaic module backsheets. It is also used in raincoats and metal sheeting. Polyvinyl fluoride is a thermoplastic fluoropolymer with a repeating vinyl fluoride unit, and it is structurally very similar to polyvinyl chloride.

== History ==
The PVF-based film was first commercialised in 1961 by DuPont under the name Tedlar.

== Polymerization ==
The most widely used polymerizations of VF are in aqueous suspensions or emulsions. High pressures are required because of the VF volatility. The high electronegativity of fluorine makes the polymerization more difficult when compared to other vinyl halides. The polymerization temperatures range from 50 °C to 150 °C and can affect the crystallinity, melting point and branching of the product. Initiation is done by peroxides or azo compounds.

The resonance stabilization of the propagating intermediate (VF radical) is poor, which often leads to monomer reversals, branching and chain-transfer reactions. The presence of impurities greatly affects the molecular weight and thermal stability of the product, as the VF radical is highly reactive. This also limits the choice of polymerization mediums, surfactants, initiators or other additives.

=== Suspension polymerization ===
The liquid VF is suspended in water and stabilized either by water-soluble polymers based on cellulose or polyvinyl alcohol. Inorganic salts can also act as stabilizers. The suspension polymerization is usually initiated by organic peroxides (eg diisopropyl peroxydicarbonate), but UV light or ionizing radiation can also be used. However, when there are no radicals present, the UV radiation decomposes the VF into acetylene and HF.

=== Emulsion polymerization ===
Emulsion polymerization can be done at highly reduced pressures and lower temperatures compared to suspension polymerization. The improved process control and reaction heat removal lead to increase in molecular weight, rate of reaction and yield. Fluorinated surfactants such as perfluorinated carboxylic acids maintain a high rate of reaction even after 40% conversion, they are thermally and chemically stable and their incorporation does not impair PVF properties. Other emulsifiers (fatty alcohol sulfates, alkane sulfonates etc) are not as effective.

== Processing ==
PVF is usually converted into thin films and coatings. However, due to its hydrogen bonds and crystallinity, a temperature above 100 °C is necessary to dissolve PVF in latent solvents. The processing by melt extrusion depends on the latent solvation of PVF in highly polar solvents and its subsequent coalescence. The incorporation of additives (plasticizers, pigments, stabilizers etc.) is done by dispersion with PVF in the latent solvent. The solvent is evaporated after extrusion.

To create biaxially oriented films, the PVF dispersed in solvent must be trailed by both transverse directions and biaxial orientations, which results in higher tensile strength. The unoriented films are also slightly stretched after casting. They are more compliant and formable and exhibit higher elongation at break than the oriented films.

== Properties ==
The majority of linkages in PVF are head-to-tail, and only 12-18 % of linkages are head-to-head. These irregularities are probably the cause of the variations in melting point, which ranges from 185 °C to 210 °C. The crystallinity of PVF ranges from 20 to 60%, depending on the polymerization method and thermal history of the polymer. It has been found that lower polymerization temperature leads to a decrease in head-to-head linkages and subsequently increase in melting point since the highly regular structures display higher crystallinity. As for stereoregularity, PVF is mostly atactic, but this does not significantly affect the melting point. The commercial atactic PVF film shows a melting point peak at 190 °C.

Several transition phases occur below the melting point, mainly at lower T_{g} from -15 to ‑20 °C, and at upper T_{g} with the temperature range of 40 to 50 °C.

PVF is insoluble in common solvents below 100 °C. When the temperature is raised, it becomes soluble in polar solvents (amides, ketones etc.). At room temperature, the PVF films are resistant to both acids and bases as well as aliphatic, aromatic and alcohol liquids.

The thermal stability of PVF is better than that of other vinyl halide polymers, reporting backbone cleavage and HF loss in an inert atmosphere at 450 °C, while in air the HF loss occurs at 350 °C.

== Safety ==
Since PVF has exceptional thermal stability, it is far safer than PVC, which degrades more easily. If PVF degradation happens, the highly reactive HF acid is generated but is quickly absorbed into the surrounding materials and dissipates.

The monomer, VF is flammable and highly reactive, forms an explosive mixture with air and is classified as "probably carcinogenic to humans".

PVF has not caused any skin reaction or toxic effects, although after excessive exposure the fluoride content in urine increased. The overheating of PVF products may result in interaction with the additives such as pigments or fillers, which may pose as an additional risk. Some formulations of the Tedlar films may contain heavy metal compounds, which can be present in dust created by secondary operations (eg sanding).

Exterior and interior PVF finishes do not create an additional danger regarding fire in residential and industrial buildings, because the carbon monoxide created by the combustion of other construction materials is far more dangerous.

== Application ==
The main applications of PVF are protective and decorative coatings, thanks to its thermal stability, and general inertness towards chemicals, corrosives and staining agents. There are two ways to apply PVF, either as a preformed film (laminating) or from dispersion (coating). These coatings can be transparent or pigmented.

In the automotive industry, PVF primer is used to improve paint adhesion, while in the aerospace engineering industry, the PVF film is applied to insulating bags containing glass fibre, which are used on exterior airplane walls, in cargo space and air condition ducts.

On the top of photovoltaic cells, the transparent PVF film protects against moisture, while the white-pigmented film is used on their bottom surface.

PVF films are non-adhering to phenolic, acrylic and epoxy resins and can be therefore used as release films, usually in high-temperature processing of these resins.

== Related compounds ==
- Vinyl fluoride
- PVC (polyvinyl chloride)
- PVDF (polyvinylidene fluoride)
- PTFE (polytetrafluoroethylene or Teflon)
