= Lead magnesium niobate =

Identifiers
3D model (JSmol)	Interactive image
Abbreviations	PMN
ChemSpider	17345689
PubChem CID	16218254
UN number	3077
CompTox Dashboard (EPA)	DTXSID601336284
- InChI: InChI=1S/Mg.2Nb.9O.3Pb Key: ZBSCCQXBYNSKPV-UHFFFAOYSA-N
- SMILES: O=[Mg].O=[Nb]12O[Nb](=O)(O1)O2.O=[Pb].O=[Pb].O=[Pb]

Properties
Chemical formula	MgNb_{2}O_{9}Pb_{3}
Molar mass	975.7 g·mol^{−1}
Density	6.1 g/cm^{3}

Hazards
- GHS labelling
Signal word	Danger
Hazard statements	H302, H332, H360, H373, H410
- Except where otherwise noted, data are given for materials in their standard state (at 25 °C [77 °F], 100 kPa). Infobox references

Average cubic perovskite structure of Pb(Mg₁/₃Nb₂/₃)O₃ (PMN). Grey spheres represent Pb and red spheres represent O. The multicoloured central sphere indicates mixed Mg/Nb occupancy of the B site, with average occupancies of 1/3 and 2/3, respectively. The cyan octahedron highlights the oxygen coordination around the B site.

Lead magnesium niobate is a relaxor ferroelectric. It has been used to make piezoelectric microcantilever sensors.

Its binary solid solution with lead titanate is a research field of interest because of its significant dielectric and piezoelectric properties. Several other doped variants of lead magnesium niobate have also been tested for properties such as improved thermal stability and larger unit cell parameter. These doping compounds include lanthanum and lead zirconate titanate.
