= 1,2-Difluoroethylene =

Skeletal formula of cis-1,2-difluoroethene with all explicit hydrogens added
cis-1,2-Difluoroethene (Z)
Skeletal formula of trans-1,2-difluoroethene with all explicit hydrogens added
trans-1,2-Difluoroethene (E)
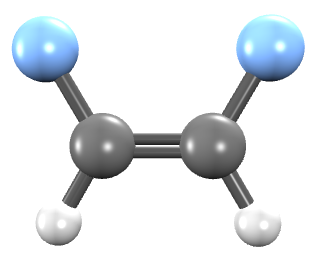
3D structure of Cis-1,2-difluoroethene
cis-1,2-Difluoroethene (Z)
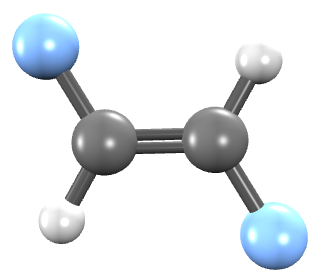
3D structure of Trans-1,2-difluoroethene
trans-1,2-Difluoroethene (E)
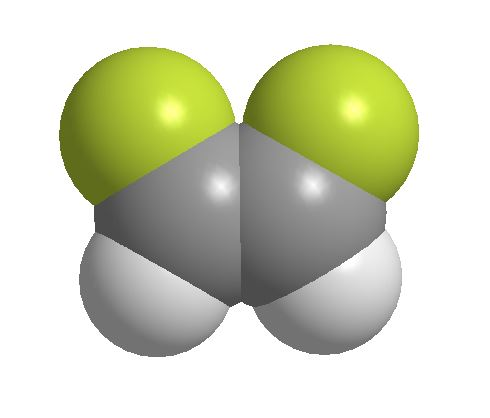
spacefill structure of Cis-1,2-difluoroethene
cis-1,2-Difluoroethene (Z)
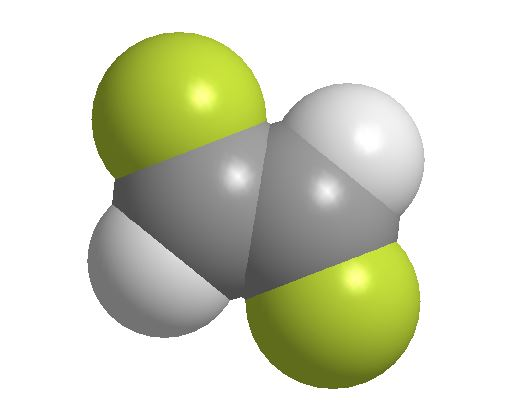
spacefill structure of Tran-1,2-difluoroethene
trans-1,2-Difluoroethene (E)

Names
- Preferred IUPAC name 1,2-Difluoroethene
- Other names 1,2-Difluoroethylene sym-Difluoroethylene; Ethene, 1,2-difluoro-,(Z)- cis-Difluoroethene

Identifiers
CAS Number	1630-77-9 (Z)
3D model (JSmol)	(cis): Interactive image; (trans): Interactive image
ChemSpider	21106435
PubChem CID	5462921
- InChI: InChI=1S/C2H2F2/c3-1-2-4/h1-2H/b2-1- Key: WFLOTYSKFUPZQB-UPHRSURJSA-N
- SMILES: (cis): C(=C/F)/F; (trans): C(=C/F)\F

Properties
Chemical formula	C_{2}H_{2}F_{2}
Molar mass	64.035 g·mol^{−1}
Boiling point	−36.0±8.0 °C
Magnetic susceptibility (χ)	−60.0·10^{−6} cm^{3}/mol
- Except where otherwise noted, data are given for materials in their standard state (at 25 °C [77 °F], 100 kPa). verify (what is ?) Infobox references

1,2-Difluoroethylene, also known as 1,2-difluoroethene, is an organofluoride with the molecular formula C_{2}H_{2}F_{2}. It can exist as either of two geometric isomers, cis-1,2-difluoroethylene or trans-1,2-difluoroethylene.

It is regarded as a hazardous chemical for being toxic by inhalation, and a volatile chemical, and it causes irritation when it comes into contact with the skin and mucous membranes.

== E-Z relative stability ==
For most 1,2-disubstituted compounds that exhibit cis–trans isomerism, the trans (E) isomer is more stable than the cis (Z) isomer. However, 1,2-difluoroethylene has the opposite situation, with the cis more stable than the trans by 0.9 kcal/mol.

== See also ==
- 1,1-Difluoroethylene
- Perfluoroisobutene
