= Tetrafluoroethane =

Tetrafluoroethane is a fluoroalkane with two isomers:

- 1,1,2,2-Tetrafluoroethane (R-134)
- 1,1,1,2-Tetrafluoroethane (R-134a)
