= 1,1-Difluoroethane =

Difluoroethane
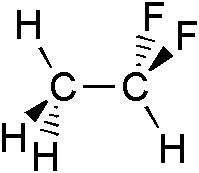
Difluoroethane
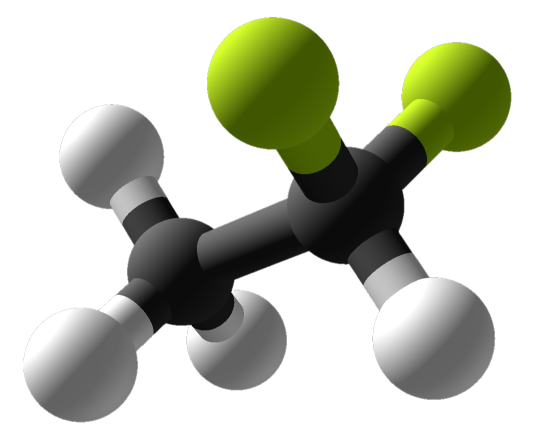
- Difluoroethane

Names
- Preferred IUPAC name 1,1-Difluoroethane
- Other names: Difluoroethane; Freon 152a; Ethylidene difluoride; Ethylidene fluoride; HFC-152a; R-152a; DFE; Tinned Wind

Identifiers
CAS Number	75-37-6
3D model (JSmol)	Interactive image
ChEMBL	ChEMBL325493
ChemSpider	6128
ECHA InfoCard	100.000.788
PubChem CID	6368
RTECS number	KI1410000
UNII	0B1U8K2ME0
CompTox Dashboard (EPA)	DTXSID0024050
- InChI: InChI=1S/C2H4F2/c1-2(3)4/h2H,1H3 Key: NPNPZTNLOVBDOC-UHFFFAOYSA-N; InChI=1/C2H4F2/c1-2(3)4/h2H,1H3 Key: NPNPZTNLOVBDOC-UHFFFAOYAM
- SMILES: FC(F)C

Properties
Chemical formula	C_{2}H_{4}F_{2}
Molar mass	66.051 g·mol^{−1}
Density	900 g/L @ 25 °C
Melting point	−117 °C (−179 °F; 156 K)
Boiling point	−24.7 °C (−12.5 °F; 248.5 K)
Critical point (T, P)	113.45 °C
Solubility in water	0.54% @ 0 °C
Vapor pressure	536 kPa (4020 mmHg) @ 21.1 °C; 510 kPa (5.1 bar) @ 20 °C
Viscosity	8.87 μPa·s (0.00887 cP) @ 25 °C

Hazards
- Occupational safety and health (OHS/OSH)
Main hazards	Extremely flammable
- GHS labelling
Pictograms	(GHS02: Flammable)
Signal word	Danger
NFPA 704 (fire diamond)	1 4 0
Safety data sheet (SDS)	SDS for 1,1-difluoroethane
- Except where otherwise noted, data are given for materials in their standard state (at 25 °C [77 °F], 100 kPa). verify (what is ?) Infobox references

1,1-Difluoroethane, or DFE, is a hydrofluorocarbon with the chemical formula C_{2}H_{4}F_{2} or CH_{3}CHF_{2}. This colorless gas is primarily used as a propellant and foam blowing agent as well as a component in a refrigerant, where it is often listed as R-152a (refrigerant-152a) or HFC-152a (hydrofluorocarbon-152a). It is predominantly used as a propellant for aerosol sprays and in gas duster products. As an alternative to chlorofluorocarbons, it has a global warming potential of 120-140, lower than other hydrofluorocarbons, and a shorter atmospheric lifetime (1.4 years).

== Production ==
1,1-Difluoroethane is a synthetic substance that is produced by the mercury-catalyzed addition of hydrogen fluoride to acetylene:

HCCH + 2 HF → CH_{3}CHF_{2}

The intermediate in this process is vinyl fluoride (C_{2}H_{3}F), the monomeric precursor to polyvinyl fluoride.

35,355 metric tons were produced in the United States in 2024.

== Uses ==
With a relatively low global warming potential (GWP) index of 124 and favorable thermophysical properties, 1,1-difluoroethane has been proposed as an environmentally friendly alternative to R134a. Despite its flammability, R152a also presents operating pressures and volumetric cooling capacity (VCC) similar to R134a, so it can be used in large chillers or in more particular applications like heat pipe finned heat exchangers.

In addition, 1,1-difluoroethane is also commonly used in gas dusters and numerous other retail aerosol products, particularly those subject to stringent volatile organic compound (VOC) requirements.

The molecular weight of difluoroethane is 66, making it a useful and convenient tool for detecting vacuum leaks in gas chromatography–mass spectrometry (GC-MS) systems. The cheap and freely available gas has a molecular weight and fragmentation pattern (base peak at m/z = 51 in typical EI-MS, major peak at m/z = 65) distinct from anything in air. If mass peaks corresponding to 1,1-difluoroethane are observed immediately after spraying a suspect leak point, leaks may be identified.

As of 2005, 80% of HFC-152a produced is used as a propellant, 15% as a foam blowing agent, and remainder for other applications including refrigerant formulations. It began to be used as a propellant in the United States and Europe in the late 1970s.

== Safety ==
1,1 Difluoroethane is an extremely flammable gas, which decomposes rapidly on heating or burning, producing toxic and irritating fumes, including hydrogen fluoride and carbon monoxide.

In a DuPont study, rats were exposed to up to 25,000 ppm (67,485 mg/m^{3}) for six hours daily, five days a week for two years. This has become the no-observed-adverse-effect level for this substance. Prolonged exposure to 1,1-difluoroethane has been linked in humans to the development of coronary disease and angina. Repeated or sufficiently high levels of exposure, particularly purposeful inhalation, can precipitate fatal cardiac arrhythmia.

=== Abuse ===
1,1 Difluoroethane is an intoxicant with abuse potential. At low doses, it can cause drowsiness, lightheadedness, and impaired speech. However, in high doses it can cause hallucinations, distorted vision, ego dissolution, and dissociative effects. It appears to act primarily through GABA_{A} and glutamate receptors.

== Environmental abundance ==
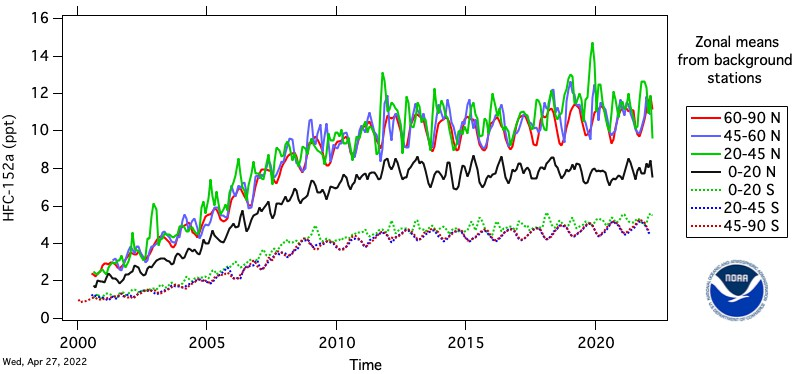
Growth of HFC-152a in Earth's atmosphere since year 2000.

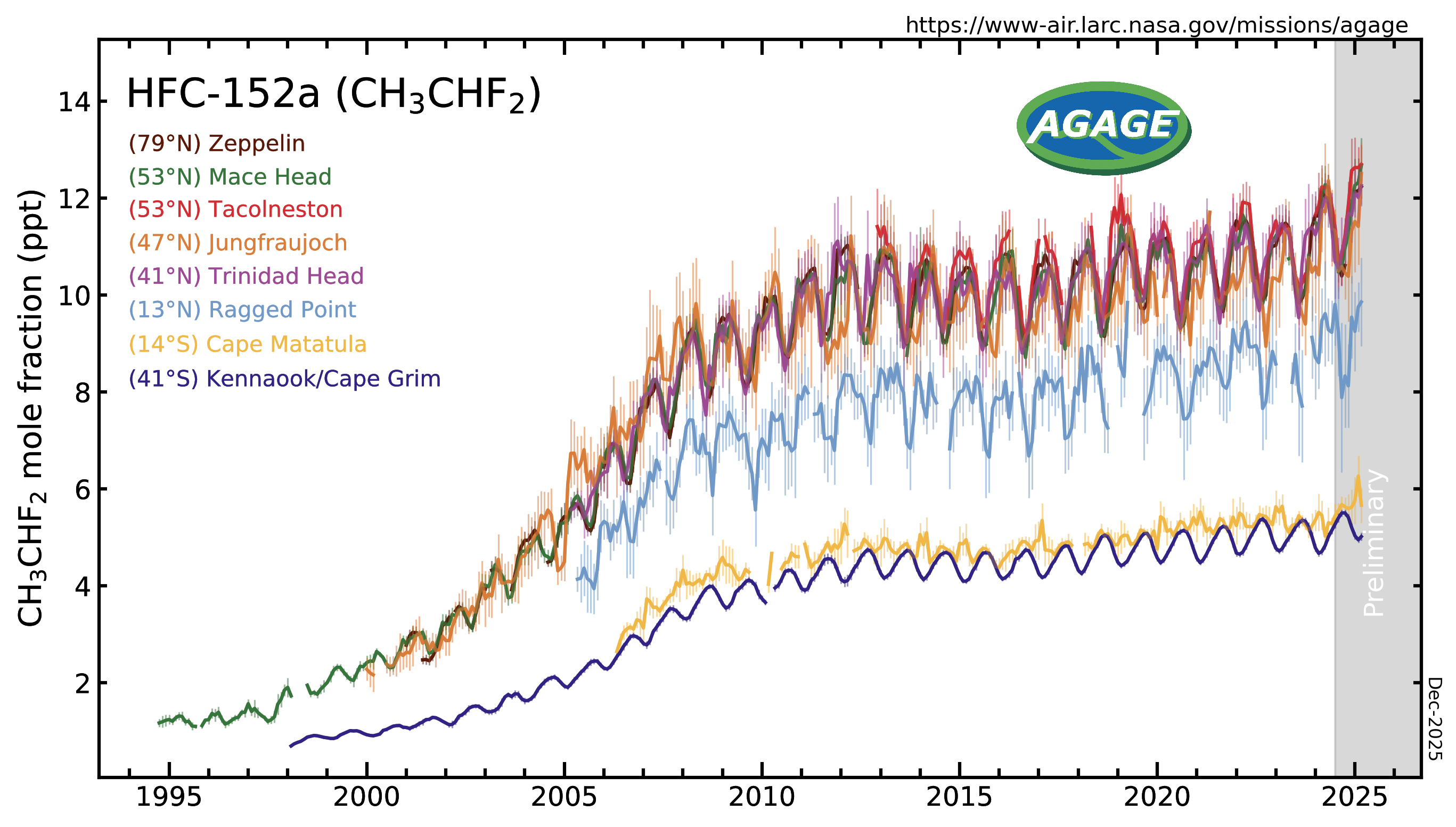
HFC-152a measured by the Advanced Global Atmospheric Gases Experiment (AGAGE) in the lower atmosphere (troposphere) at stations around the world. Abundances are given as pollution free monthly mean mole fractions in parts-per-trillion.

Most production, use, and emissions of HFC-152a have occurred within Earth's more industrialized and populated northern hemisphere following the substance's introduction in the 1990s. Its concentration in the northern troposphere reached an annual average of about 10 parts per trillion by year 2011. The concentration of HFC-152a in the southern troposphere is about 50% lower due to its removal rate (i.e. lifetime) of about 1.5 years being similar in magnitude to the global atmospheric mixing time of one to two years.

== See also ==
- List of refrigerants
- Canned air
- IPCC list of greenhouse gases
