= Difluoroethane =

Difluoroethane may refer to:

- 1,1-Difluoroethane, used as a refrigerant and propellant for aerosol sprays
- 1,2-Difluoroethane, primarily used in refrigerants, foam blowing agents, solvents and fluoropolymers

== See also ==
- Difluoroethene
- Dichloroethane
