= Thermal stability =

Work needed to transform a body of water into one with uniform density

In thermodynamics, thermal stability describes the stability of a water body and its resistance to mixing. It is the amount of work needed to transform the water to a uniform water density. The Schmidt stability "S" is commonly measured in joules per square meter (J/m^{2}).
