= Dichlorodifluoroethylene =

- 1,1-Dichloro-2,2-difluoroethylene

cis-1,2-Dichloro-1,2-difluoroethylene
trans-1,2-Dichloro-1,2-difluoroethylene

Names
- IUPAC names 1,1-Dichloro-2,2-difluoroethene (Z)-1,2-Dichloro-1,2-difluoroethene (E)-1,2-Dichloro-1,2-difluoroethene

Identifiers
CAS Number	79-35-6; 311-81-9 (cis); 381-71-5 (trans)
3D model (JSmol)	Interactive image; Interactive image; Interactive image
ChemSpider	21106435; 2018468; 2297331
ECHA InfoCard	100.001.090
PubChem CID	6592; 2736814; 3032334
UNII	WC503FP86Y
CompTox Dashboard (EPA)	DTXSID6073150
- InChI: InChI=1S/C2Cl2F2/c3-1(4)2(5)6 Key: QDGONURINHVBEW-UHFFFAOYSA-N; InChI=1S/C2Cl2F2/c3-1(5)2(4)6/b2-1- Key: UPVJEODAZWTJKZ-UPHRSURJSA-N; InChI=1S/C2Cl2F2/c3-1(5)2(4)6/b2-1+ Key: UPVJEODAZWTJKZ-OWOJBTEDSA-N
- SMILES: ClC(Cl)=C(F)F; Cl/C(F)=C(\Cl)F; Cl/C(F)=C(/Cl)F

Properties
Chemical formula	C_{2}Cl_{2}F_{2}
Molar mass	132.92 g·mol^{−1}
Magnetic susceptibility (χ)	−60.0·10^{−6} cm^{3}/mol
- Except where otherwise noted, data are given for materials in their standard state (at 25 °C [77 °F], 100 kPa). verify (what is ?) Infobox references

A dichlorodifluoroethylene (systematically named dichlorodifluoroethene) is one of three compounds with the chemical formula C_{2}Cl_{2}F_{2}. Dichlorodifluoroethylenes are colourless gases, and are some of the simplest chlorodifluoroalkenes.

The structural isomers are used as intermediates or precursors in the production of other industrial chemicals.

== 1,1-Dichloro-2,2-difluoroethylene ==
1,1-Dichloro-2,2-difluoroethylene is a low-boiling liquid that is used a refrigerant. It may also be used as a solvent, but has practical limitations as such, because of its low boiling point (commercial listings, 19 °C; lit. 17 °C).

It is regarded as a hazardous chemical for being toxic by inhalation (see MSDS), and a low-boiling liquid, and it causes irritation when it comes into contact with the skin and mucous membranes. Its ASHRAE number is R-1112a, and its CAS number is 79-35-6. Concentrated 1,1-dichloro-2,2-difluoroethylene can be ignited with ease in the laboratory.

== cis- and trans-1,2-dichloro-1,2-difluoroethylene ==
The diastereomers were co-isolated first in 1965, by using a combination of fractional melting and fractional distillation. The cis isomer's ASHRAE number is R-1112c, and its CAS number is 311-81-9. Its melting point is −119.6 °C (−183.3 °F). The trans isomer's ASHRAE number is R-1112t, and its CAS number is 381-71-5. Its melting point is −93.3 °C (−135.9 °F). The diastereomers are commercially only available as a mixtures of varying proportions.
