= Trifluoroethylene =

Names
- IUPAC name Trifluoroethene

Identifiers
CAS Number	359-11-5
3D model (JSmol)	Interactive image
ChemSpider	9284
ECHA InfoCard	100.006.025
EC Number	206-626-2
PubChem CID	9665
UNII	Z2866M3Z1A
CompTox Dashboard (EPA)	DTXSID4059887
- InChI: InChI=1S/C2HF3/c3-1-2(4)5/h1H Key: MIZLGWKEZAPEFJ-UHFFFAOYSA-N
- SMILES: C(=C(F)F)F

Properties
Chemical formula	C_{2}HF_{3}
Molar mass	82.025 g·mol^{−1}
Appearance	Colourless gas
Density	1.26 g/cm^{3} (liquid, at –70 °C)
Boiling point	−51 °C (−60 °F; 222 K)
Solubility	soluble in ether, slightly soluble in ethanol

Hazards
- GHS labelling
Pictograms	(GHS02: Flammable) (GHS04: Compressed Gas)
Signal word	Danger
Hazard statements	H220, H280
Precautionary statements	P203, P210, P222, P280, P377, P381, P403, P410+P403

Related compounds
Related Vinyl halides	Vinyl fluoride, vinylidene fluoride, tetrafluoroethylene, trichloroethylene
- Except where otherwise noted, data are given for materials in their standard state (at 25 °C [77 °F], 100 kPa). Infobox references

Trifluoroethylene (abbreviated as TrFE) is an organofluoride compound with the chemical formula C_{2}HF_{3}. It is a colourless gas. TrFE can polymerise to form poly(trifluoroethylene) (PTrFE). It can also form copolymers with other monomers, such as vinylidene fluoride to form a co-polymer that is used to produce ferroelectric materials.
