= Initiation (chemistry) =

Chemical reaction that triggers one or more secondary reactions

In chemistry, initiation is a chemical reaction that triggers one or more secondary reactions. Initiation creates a reactive centre on a molecule which produces a chain reaction. The reactive centre generated by initiation is usually a radical, but can also be cations or anions. Once the reaction is initiated, the species goes through propagation where the reactive species reacts with stable molecules, producing stable species and reactive species. This process can produce very long chains of molecules called polymers, which are the building blocks for many materials. After propagation, the reaction is then terminated. There are different types of initiation, with the two main ways being thermal initiation and photo-initiation (light).

== Thermal initiation ==
Thermal initiation involves initiating a reaction in the presence of heat, usually at very high temperatures. Heating a reaction can result in radical initiation of the substrate(s). In the presence of heat, a monomer can self-initiate and react with other monomers or pairs of monomers. This process is called spontaneous polymerization and requires a lot of heat to occur (up to 200 °C). For monomers to initiate and polymerize with the same type of monomer (called Homopolymerization), ~180 °C is needed for the monomers to initiate. Copolymerization, which is when different kinds of monomers are initiated and react with each other, is more stable and can happen at lower temperatures than Homopolymerization. Self-initiation between homo-monomers is a difficult mechanism to observe because species that are initiated aren't always the same kind of monomer. Sometimes impurities found in the reaction flask with the monomers get initiated and polymerize with monomers, instead of the monomer getting initiated.

Simple thermal initiation reaction of dimethyl peroxide

== Photoinitiation (light) ==
Photo-initiation occurs when monomers get initiated by light irradiation. LED light passes through the reaction flask which excites the monomers turning them into reactive species, mainly radicals and ions, which can then polymerize. There are two mechanistic classifications of photo-initiation reactions, being either a photoredox process or intramolecular photochemical process. This type of initiation can happen at much lower temperatures, mainly room temperature, then thermal initiation. This makes photo-initiation much more practical than thermal initiation. Photo-initiation also produces less side reactions than thermal and has less impurities. Though thermal initiation is hard to maintain, photo-initiation provides an easy way to initiate monomers to polymerize. Photo-initiation is even used in application such as making various coatings, adhesives, inks, and microelectronics.

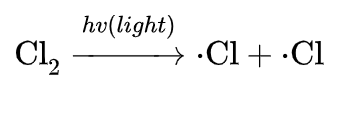
Simple initiation reaction of dichlorine into two chlorine radicals; initiated by light.

== See also ==
- Free radical addition

== Sources ==
1. R. G., Compton.1992. Mechanism and Kinetics of Addition Polymerizations, 30, 75-162.
2. Britannica, The Editors of Encyclopaedia. "chain reaction". Encyclopedia Britannica, 2 May. 2017, https://www.britannica.com/science/chain-reaction. Accessed 29 March 2023.
3. Britannica, The Editors of Encyclopaedia. "polymer". Encyclopedia Britannica, 2 Jan. 2023, https://www.britannica.com/science/polymer. Accessed 31 March 2023.
4. Graeme, Moad and David H., Solomon. 1989. Comprehensive Polymer Science and Supplements. 141-146.
5. Yagçi, Y., Jockusch, S., Turro, N.J. Photoinitiated Polymerization: Advances, Challenges, and Opportunities. Macromolecules 2010, 43, 6245–6260.
6. Gijsman, P., Hensen, G., Manon, M. Thermal initiation of the oxidation of thermoplastic polymers (Polyamides, Polyesters and UHMwPE). Polymer Degradation and Stability 2021, 183.
7. Chen, M., Zhong, M., Johnson, J. A. Light-Controlled Radical Polymerization: Mechanisms, Methods, and Applications. Chemical Reviews, 2016,116(17), 10167–1021.
8. Khojczyk (2011-20-09), English: Hofmann-Löffler-Freytag reaction mechanism, retrieved 2023-03-31.
