= Alliance for Consumer Education =

- Abbreviation: ACE
- Formation: 2000
- Purpose: To promote responsible and beneficial use of products to ensure a safer, healthier and cleaner environment in homes, businesses and the community
- Location: Washington, D.C.
- Website: consumered.org

The Alliance for Consumer Education (ACE) is a 501(c)(3), non-profit foundation based in Washington, D.C., dedicated to advancing community health and well-being.

Since its founding over a decade ago, ACE has designed and implemented three core programs: Inhalant Abuse Prevention, Disease Prevention, and Heroes of the Health League.

== History ==
ACE first emerged in early 2000 when a small group of leaders from the household product industry combined forces with several nonprofit organizations to form a partnership committed to ensuring the health of children, families, and communities across the United States. ACE was formed to promote the responsible and beneficial use of products to ensure a cleaner, safer, and healthier environment, and it officially became a 501(c)(3) nonprofit organization on May 30, 2001.

On October 25, 2011, U.S. Senator Herb Kohl (D-WI) was named as honorary chair. In 2016, Ann Marie Buerkle was named as honorary chair.

== Programs ==
=== Inhalant Abuse Prevention ===
ACE's flagship program, Inhalant Abuse Prevention, is designed to provide parents with practical information about inhalant abuse so they can include it in substance abuse discussions with their children. At the core of this program are the Inhalant Abuse Prevention Kits and Inhalant Abuse Prevention Facilitators Guide and Lesson Plan, which are currently being sent to thousands of schools and communities across the country.

=== Disease Prevention ===
The goal of ACE's Disease Prevention Program is to strengthen and promote a healthier environment within homes, businesses, and the community by providing information necessary to break the cycle of disease transmission. The program uses its mascots Ace Clean and Professor Grime as aids to educate people on simple steps to keep themselves and their families safe and healthy.

=== Heroes of the Health League ===
Heroes of the Health League was launched in 2011. It offers an all-encompassing look at the home, covering topics relating to poison prevention, proper disposal and storage, pet safety, fire safety, and sustainability concepts.

== Partnerships ==
- On October 1, 2010, Ace Clean, ACE's disease-fighting superhero mascot, appeared in Times Square with Iron Man to host a hand washing demonstration. In 2011, the Alliance for Consumer Education received a Media Relations honorable mention at the PR News' Nonprofit PR Awards for this event.
- In 2011, ACE partnered with the Minnesota Twins to launch "Strike Out Inhalant Abuse in Minnesota", an event to provide information about inhalant abuse prevention.
- In September 2012 the Alliance for Consumer Education partnered with Marvel to craft a new poster of Iron Man and Ace Clean, the Alliance for Consumer Education mascot, along with Ace Clean's nemesis Professor Grime. The poster featured the action heroes accompanied by facts on germ prevention and games to entertain kids of all ages.
- In 2012, the Alliance for Consumer Education partnered with six minor league baseball teams: Portland Sea Dogs, Vermont Lake Monsters, Lowell Spinners, New Britain Rock Cats, Pawtucket Red Sox, and New Hampshire Fischer Cats as part of their "Strike-Out Inhalant Abuse" campaign to raise awareness of inhalant abuse. The teams worked with their local chapters of SADD to conduct school assemblies and each team held an "Awareness Night" baseball game to spread awareness of Inhalant Abuse to fans.
- In March 2013 the Alliance for Consumer Education partnered with the YMCA, The American Association of Poison Control Centers and Superheroes for Kids for their "Be A Superhero in Your Home" event on March 22, 2013. The event took place during National Inhalant and Poison Awareness Week at the Arlington YMCA and focused on educating children about inhalant abuse and poison prevention.
