= Electrostriction =

Ability of non-conductive materials to change shape under an electric field

In electromagnetism, electrostriction is a property of all electrical non-conductors or dielectrics. Electrostriction causes these materials to change their shape under the application of an electric field. It is the dual property to magnetostriction.

== Explanation ==
Electrostriction is a property of all dielectric materials, and is caused by displacement of ions (and the associated changes to the electrons) in the crystal lattice upon being exposed to an external electric field. The cause of electrostriction is linked to anharmonic effects. Positive ions will be displaced in the direction of the field, while negative ions will be displaced in the opposite direction. This displacement will accumulate throughout the bulk material and result in an overall strain (elongation) in the direction of the field. The thickness will be reduced in the orthogonal directions characterized by Poisson's ratio. All insulating materials consisting of more than one type of atom will be ionic to some extent due to the difference of electronegativity of the atoms, and therefore exhibit electrostriction.

The resulting strain (ratio of deformation to the original dimension) is proportional to the square of the polarization. Reversal of the electric field does not reverse the direction of the deformation.

More formally, the electrostriction coefficient is a rank four tensor ($Q_{ijkl}$), relating the rank two strain tensor ($\varepsilon_{ij}$) and the electric polarization density vector (i.e. rank one tensor; $P_k$)

$$\varepsilon_{ij} = Q_{ijkl}P_k P_l.$$

The electrostrictive tensor satisfies

$$Q_{ijkl} = \frac{1}{2}\frac{\partial^2\varepsilon_{ij}}{\partial P_k \partial P_l}.$$

The related piezoelectric effect occurs only in a particular class of dielectrics. Electrostriction applies to all crystal symmetries, while the piezoelectric effect only applies to the 20 piezoelectric point groups. Piezoelectricity is equivalent to the electrostrictive displacement of ions in ferroelectric materials. Electrostriction is a quadratic effect, unlike piezoelectricity, which is a linear effect.

== Materials ==
Although all dielectrics exhibit some electrostriction, certain engineered ceramics, known as relaxor ferroelectrics, have extraordinarily high electrostrictive constants. The most commonly used are

- lead magnesium niobate (PMN)
- lead magnesium niobate-lead titanate (PMN-PT)
- lead lanthanum zirconate titanate (PLZT)

== Magnitude of effect ==
Electrostriction can produce a strain on the order of 0.1% for some materials. This occurs at a field strength of 2 million volts per meter (2 MV/m) for the material PMN-15. Electrostriction exists in all materials, but is generally negligible.

== Applications ==
- Sonar projectors for submarines and surface vessels
- Actuators for small displacements
- Sensors, provided a bias electric field or pre-stress is present.

== See also ==
- Magnetostriction
- Photoelasticity
- Piezomagnetism
- Piezoelectricity
- Relaxor ferroelectric
