= 2-Chloro-1,1,1-trifluoroethane =

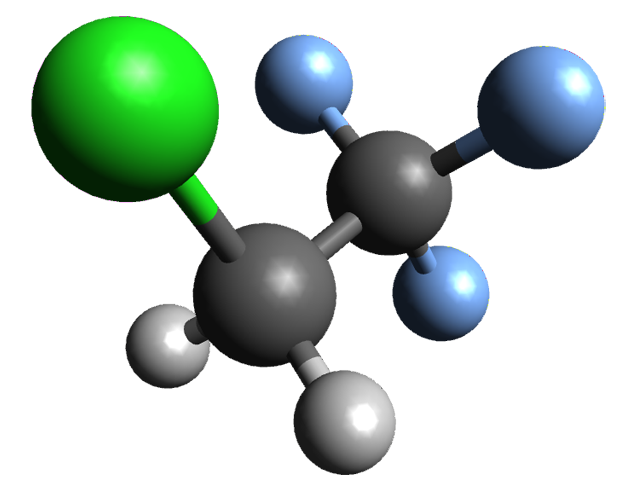

Names
- Preferred IUPAC name 2-Chloro-1,1,1-trifluoroethane
- Other names: 1,1,1-Trifluoro-2-chloroethane; Chlorotrifluoroethane; Freon 133a; HCFC 133a; R133a

Identifiers
CAS Number	75-88-7
3D model (JSmol)	Interactive image
ChEBI	CHEBI:82423
ChemSpider	6168
ECHA InfoCard	100.000.830
EC Number	200-912-0200-912-0
PubChem CID	6408
RTECS number	KH8008500
UNII	H86O899T9B
UN number	1983
CompTox Dashboard (EPA)	DTXSID5020289
- InChI: InChI=1S/C2H2ClF3/c3-1-2(4,5)6/h1H2 Key: CYXIKYKBLDZZNW-UHFFFAOYSA-N
- SMILES: C(C(F)(F)F)Cl

Properties
Chemical formula	C_{2}H_{2}ClF_{3}
Molar mass	118.48 g/mol
Appearance	Gas
Density	1.389 g/cm3 (liquid at 0 °C)
Melting point	−105.3 °C (−157.5 °F; 167.8 K)
Boiling point	6.1 °C (43.0 °F; 279.2 K)
Solubility in water	0.89 g/l
Refractive index (n_{D})	1.3092 (liquid at 0 °C)
- Except where otherwise noted, data are given for materials in their standard state (at 25 °C [77 °F], 100 kPa). (what is ?) Infobox references

2-Chloro-1,1,1-trifluoroethane, also known as 1,1,1-trifluoro-2-chloroethane or Freon 133a, is an alkyl halide belonging to the category of hydrochlorofluorocarbons, having chemical formula F_{3}C-CH_{2}-Cl. Under standard conditions, it appears as a colorless gas, partially soluble in water. It is used as a refrigerant, as a solvent and as a reagent in organic synthesis.

It can be made by the reaction of trichloroethylene and hydrogen fluoride.

== Gallery ==
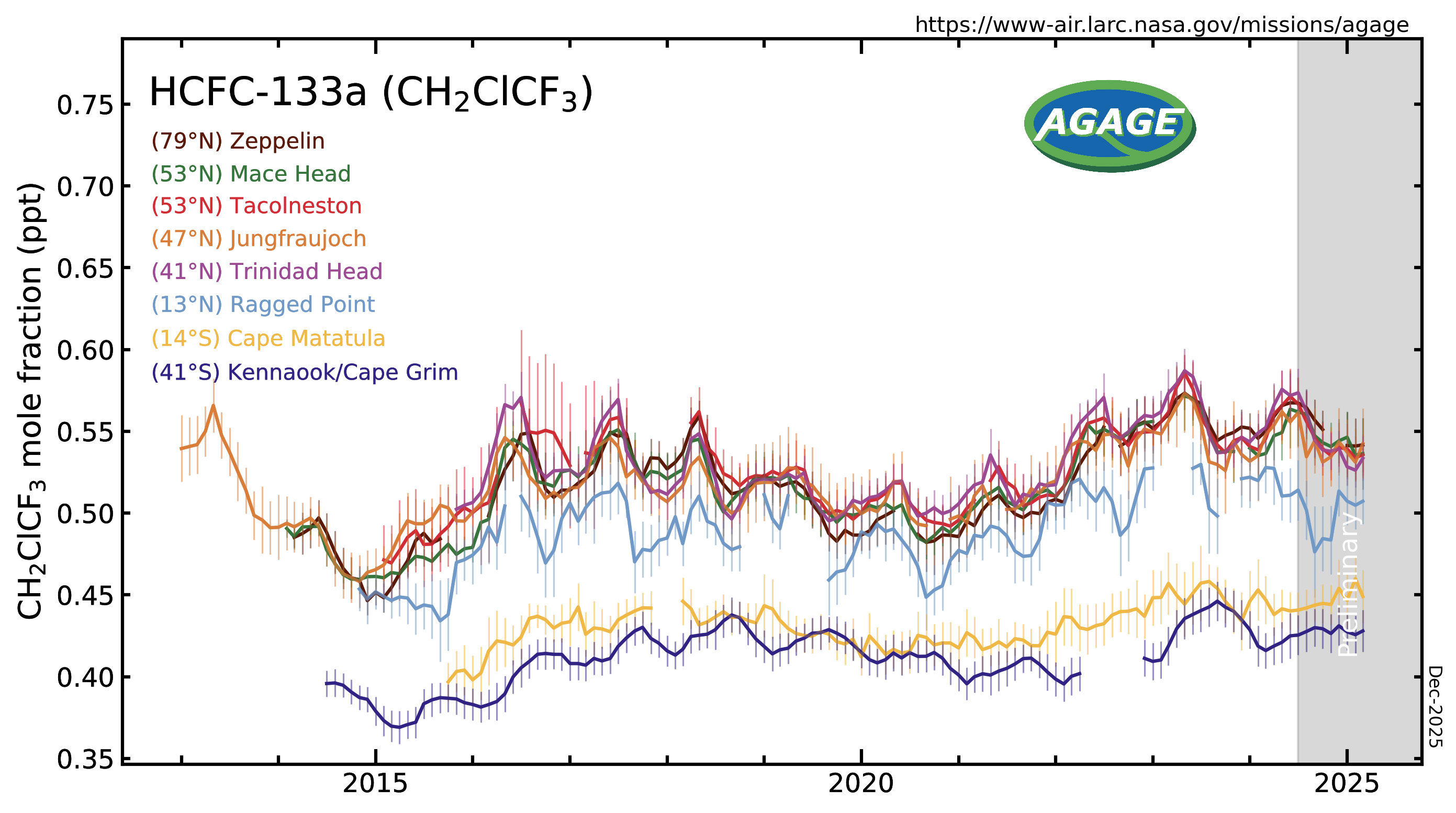
HCFC-133a measured by the Advanced Global Atmospheric Gases Experiment (AGAGE) in the lower atmosphere (troposphere) at stations around the world. Abundances are given as pollution free monthly mean mole fractions in parts-per-trillion.
