= 1-Chloro-1,1-difluoroethane =

Names
- Preferred IUPAC name 1-Chloro-1,1-difluoroethane
- Other names Freon 142b; R-142b; HCFC-142b; Chlorodifluoroethane

Identifiers
CAS Number	75-68-3
3D model (JSmol)	Interactive image
ChemSpider	6148
ECHA InfoCard	100.000.811
PubChem CID	9625
UNII	FUC3XHA6GY
CompTox Dashboard (EPA)	DTXSID9023960
- InChI: InChI=1S/C2H3ClF2/c1-2(3,4)5/h1H3 Key: BHNZEZWIUMJCGF-UHFFFAOYSA-N
- SMILES: CC(F)(F)Cl

Properties
Chemical formula	C_{2}H_{3}ClF_{2}
Molar mass	100.49 g·mol^{−1}
Appearance	Colorless gas
Melting point	−130.8 °C (−203.4 °F; 142.3 K)
Boiling point	−9.6 °C (14.7 °F; 263.5 K)
Solubility in water	Slight

Hazards
- Occupational safety and health (OHS/OSH)
Main hazards	Asphyxiant
Autoignition temperature	632 °C (1,170 °F; 905 K)
- Except where otherwise noted, data are given for materials in their standard state (at 25 °C [77 °F], 100 kPa). verify (what is ?) Infobox references

1-Chloro-1,1-difluoroethane (HCFC-142b) is a haloalkane with the chemical formula CH_{3}CClF_{2}. It belongs to the hydrochlorofluorocarbon (HCFC) family of man-made compounds that contribute significantly to both ozone depletion and global warming when released into the environment. It is primarily used as a refrigerant where it is also known as R-142b and by trade names including Freon-142b.

== Physiochemical properties ==
1-Chloro-1,1-difluoroethane is a highly flammable, colorless gas under most atmospheric conditions. It has a boiling point of −10 °C. Its critical temperature is near 137 °C.

== Applications ==
HCFC-142b is used as a refrigerant, as a blowing agent for foam plastics production, and as feedstock to make polyvinylidene fluoride (PVDF). It was introduced to replace the chlorofluorocarbons (CFCs) that were initially undergoing a phase-out per the Montreal Protocol, but HCFCs still have a significant ozone-depletion ability. As of year 2020, HCFC's are replaced by non ozone depleting HFCs within many applications.

In the United States, the EPA stated that HCFCs could be used in "processes that result in the transformation or destruction of the HCFCs", such as using HCFC-142b as a feedstock to make PVDF. HCFCs could also be used in equipment that was manufactured before January 1, 2010. The point of these new regulations was to phase-out HCFCs in much the same way that CFCs were phased out. HCFC-142b production in non article 5 countries like the United States was banned on January 1, 2020, under the Montreal Protocol.

== Production history ==
According to the Alternative Fluorocarbons Environmental Acceptability Study (AFEAS), in 2006 global production (excluding India and China who did not report production data) of HCFC-142b was 33,779 metric tons and an increase in production from 2006 to 2007 of 34%.

For the most part, concentrations of HCFCs in the atmosphere match the emission rates that were reported by industries. The exception to this is HCFC-142b which had a higher concentration than the emission rates suggest it should.

== Environmental effects ==
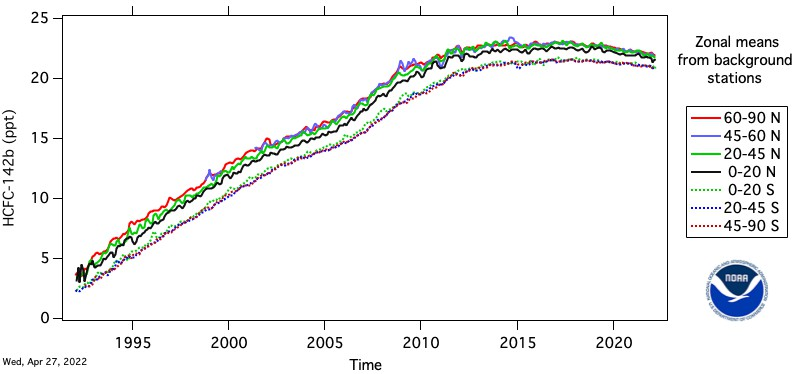
Growth of HCFC-142b in Earth's atmosphere since year 1992.

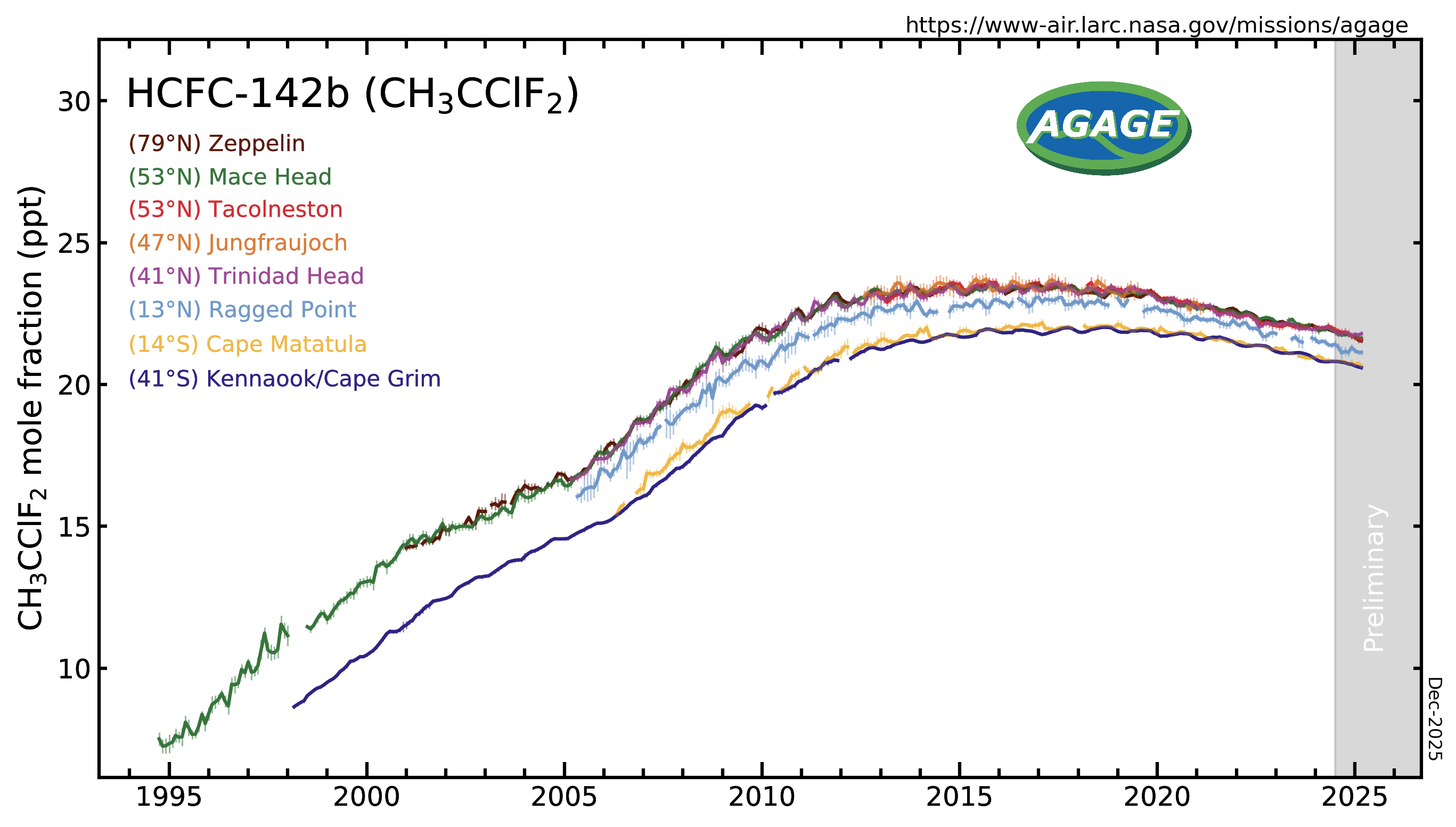
HCFC-142b measured by the Advanced Global Atmospheric Gases Experiment (AGAGE) in the lower atmosphere (troposphere) at stations around the world. Abundances are given as pollution free monthly mean mole fractions in parts-per-trillion.

The concentration of HCFC-142b in the atmosphere grew to over 20 parts per trillion by year 2010. It has an ozone depletion potential (ODP) of 0.07. This is low compared to the ODP=1 of trichlorofluoromethane (CFC-11, R-11), which also grew about ten times more abundant in the atmosphere by year 1985 (prior to introduction of HCFC-142b and the Montreal Protocol).

HCFC-142b is also a minor but potent greenhouse gas. It has an estimated lifetime of about 17 years and a 100-year global warming potential ranging 2300 to 5000. This compares to the GWP=1 of carbon dioxide, which had a much greater atmospheric concentration near 400 parts per million in year 2020.

== See also ==
- IPCC list of greenhouse gases
- List of refrigerants
