= Relaxor ferroelectric =

Relaxor ferroelectrics are ferroelectric materials that exhibit high electrostriction. As of 2015, although they have been studied for over fifty years, the mechanism for this effect is still not completely understood, and is the subject of continuing research.

Examples of relaxor ferroelectrics include:

- lead magnesium niobate (PMN)
- lead magnesium niobate-lead titanate (PMN-PT)
- lead lanthanum zirconate titanate (PLZT)
- lead scandium niobate (PSN)
- Barium Titanium-Bismuth Zinc Niobium Tantalum (BT-BZNT)
- Barium Titanium-Barium Strontium Titanium (BT-BST)

== Applications ==
Relaxor Ferroelectric materials find application in high efficiency energy storage and conversion as they have high dielectric constants, orders-of-magnitude higher than those of conventional ferroelectric materials. Like conventional ferroelectrics, Relaxor Ferroelectrics show permanent dipole moment in domains. However, these domains are on the nano-length scale, unlike conventional ferroelectrics domains that are generally on the micro-length scale, and take less energy to align. Consequently, Relaxor Ferroelectrics have very high specific capacitance and have thus generated interest in the fields of energy storage. Furthermore, due to their slim hysteresis curve with high saturated polarization and low remnant polarization, Relaxor ferroelectrics have high discharge energy density and high discharge rates. BT-BZNT Multilayer Energy Storage Ceramic Capacitors (MLESCC) were experimentally determined to have very high efficiency(>80%) and stable thermal properties over a wide temperature range.
