= 1,1,2,2-Tetrafluoroethane =

Structure
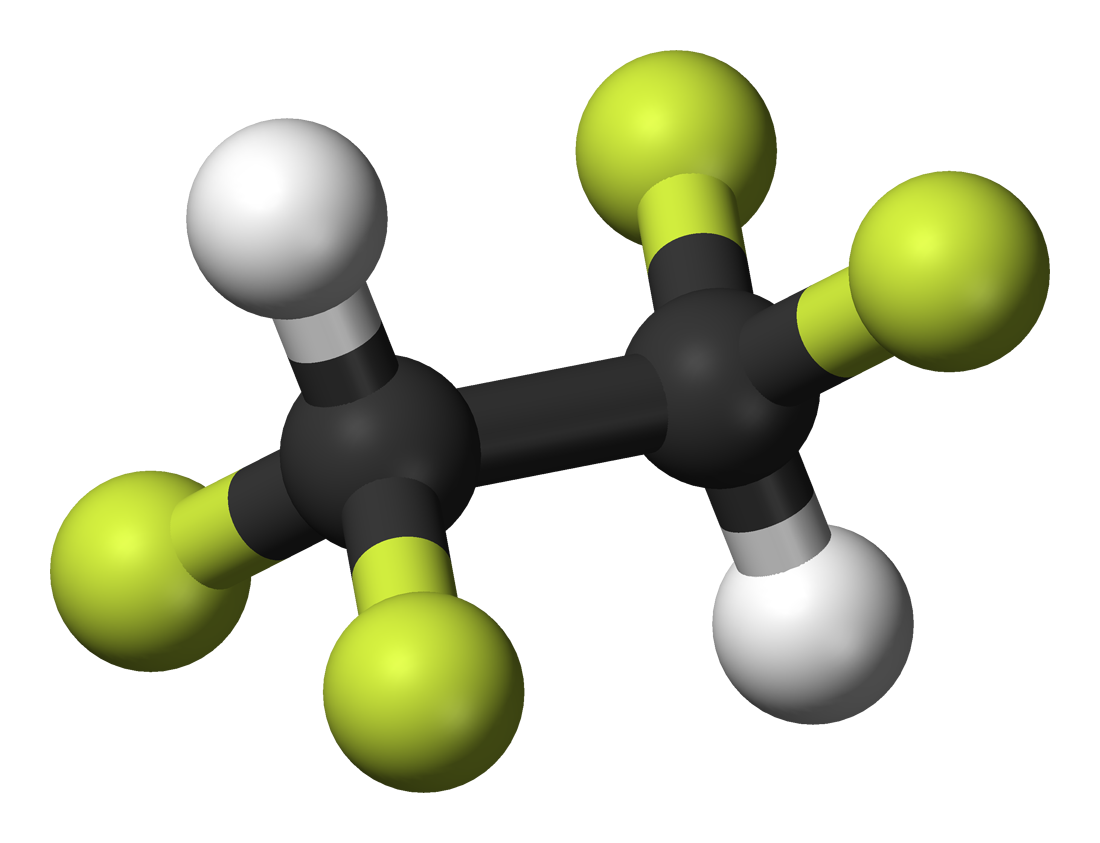
3-D structure

Names
- Preferred IUPAC name 1,1,2,2-tetrafluoroethane
- Other names R-134, HFC-134, Freon 134

Identifiers
CAS Number	359-35-3
3D model (JSmol)	Interactive image
ChemSpider	9286
ECHA InfoCard	100.006.027
EC Number	206-628-3
PubChem CID	9667
UNII	X2I96B6OVW
CompTox Dashboard (EPA)	DTXSID60883371
- InChI: InChI=1S/C2H2F4/c3-1(4)2(5)6/h1-2H Key: WXGNWUVNYMJENI-UHFFFAOYSA-N
- SMILES: C(C(F)F)(F)F

Properties
Chemical formula	C_{2}H_{2}F_{4}
Molar mass	102.032 g·mol^{−1}
Appearance	Colorless gas
Melting point	−89 °C (−128 °F; 184 K)
Boiling point	−19.9 °C (−3.8 °F; 253.2 K)
- Except where otherwise noted, data are given for materials in their standard state (at 25 °C [77 °F], 100 kPa). Infobox references

1,1,2,2-Tetrafluoroethane (also called R-134 or HFC-134) is a hydrofluorocarbon, a fluorinated alkane. It is an isomer of the more-used 1,1,1,2-tetrafluoroethane (R-134a). It is used as a foam expansion agent and heat transfer fluid.
