= Vinyl fluoride =

Names
- Preferred IUPAC name Fluoroethene
- Other names Vinylfluoride, Fluoroethylene, Monofluoroethylene, Vinyl fluoride monomer, VF, R 1141, UN 1860 (inhibited)

Identifiers
CAS Number	75-02-5
3D model (JSmol)	Interactive image
Beilstein Reference	1731574
ChEBI	CHEBI:51314
ChemSpider	6099
ECHA InfoCard	100.000.757
EC Number	200-832-6
Gmelin Reference	130238
KEGG	C19185
PubChem CID	6339
RTECS number	YZ7351000
UNII	2598465ICX
CompTox Dashboard (EPA)	DTXSID3021435
- InChI: InChI=1S/C2H3F/c1-2-3/h2H,1H2 Key: XUCNUKMRBVNAPB-UHFFFAOYSA-N; InChI=1/C2H3F/c1-2-3/h2H,1H2
- SMILES: FC=C

Properties
Chemical formula	C_{2}H_{3}F
Molar mass	46.04 g/mol
Appearance	Colorless gas
Odor	faint, ethereal
Density	0.636 g/cm^{3}
Melting point	−160.5 °C (−256.9 °F; 112.6 K)
Boiling point	−72.2 °C (−98.0 °F; 201.0 K)
Solubility in water	Slightly soluble
Vapor pressure	25.2 atm (370.4 psi)

Hazards
- GHS labelling
Pictograms	(GHS02: Flammable) (GHS08: Health hazard)
Signal word	Danger
Hazard statements	H220, H341, H350, H373
Precautionary statements	P201, P202, P210, P260, P281, P308+P313, P314, P377, P381, P403, P405, P410+P403, P501
NFPA 704 (fire diamond)	1 4 2
Autoignition temperature	385 °C (725 °F; 658 K)
Explosive limits	2.6–21.7%
- NIOSH (US health exposure limits)
PEL (Permissible)	none
REL (Recommended)	TWA 1 ppm C 5 ppm
IDLH (Immediate danger)	N.D.
- Except where otherwise noted, data are given for materials in their standard state (at 25 °C [77 °F], 100 kPa). verify (what is ?) Infobox references

Vinyl fluoride is an organic halide with the chemical formula C_{2}H_{3}F. It is a colorless gas with a faint ether-like odor. It is used as the monomeric precursor to the fluoropolymer polyvinylfluoride.

== Production ==
It was first prepared in 1901 by Frédéric Swarts, the Belgian chemist who was the first to prepare chlorofluorocarbons in 1892. Swarts used the reaction of zinc with 1,1-difluoro-2-bromoethane. It is produced industrially by two routes, one being the mercury-catalyzed reaction of acetylene and hydrogen fluoride:

HC≡CH + HF → CH_{2}=CHF

It is also prepared from 1,1-chlorofluoroethane:

CH_{3}CHClF → CH_{2}=CHF + HCl

== Safety ==
Vinyl fluoride is classified as an IARC Group 2A carcinogen (likely to cause cancer in humans).

== Additional data ==
Its critical point is at 54.8 °C (328 K) and 5.24 MPa. Its molecular dipole moment is 1.4 Debye and heat of vaporization is 361 kJ/kg.

== See also ==
- Polyvinyl fluoride
- Vinyl chloride
- Vinyl bromide
