= 1,1,1-Trifluoroethane =

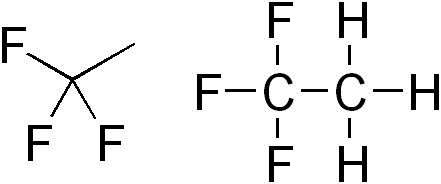

Names
- Preferred IUPAC name 1,1,1-Trifluoroethane
- Other names Methylfluoroform, 1,1,1-Trifluoroform, R-143a, HFC-143a, UN 2035

Identifiers
| CAS Number | 420-46-2 |
| 3D model (JSmol) | Interactive image |
| ChemSpider | 9484 |
| ECHA InfoCard | 100.006.361 |
| EC Number | 206-996-5 |
| PubChem CID | 9868 |
| UNII | 84581C5PRN |
| UN number | 2035 |
| CompTox Dashboard (EPA) | DTXSID101336253 DTXSID9042047, DTXSID101336253 |
- InChI: InChI=1S/C2H3F3/c1-2(3,4)5/h1H3 Key: UJPMYEOUBPIPHQ-UHFFFAOYSA-N; InChI=1/C2H3F3/c1-2(3,4)5/h1H3 Key: UJPMYEOUBPIPHQ-UHFFFAOYAD
- SMILES: FC(F)(F)C

Properties
| Chemical formula | C_{2}H_{3}F_{3} |
| Molar mass | 84.04 g/mol |
| Appearance | Colourless gas |
| Density | 3.7 kg/m^{3} (gas) |
| Melting point | −111 °C (−168 °F; 162 K) |
| Boiling point | −47.6 °C (−53.7 °F; 225.6 K) |
| Vapor pressure | 11 200 hPa (20 °C) |

Hazards
- GHS labelling
| Pictograms | (GHS02: Flammable) |
| Signal word | Danger |
| Hazard statements | H220, H224 |
| Precautionary statements | P210, P233, P240, P241, P242, P243, P280, P303+P361+P353, P370+P378, P377, P381, P403, P403+P235, P410+P403, P501 |
- Except where otherwise noted, data are given for materials in their standard state (at 25 °C [77 °F], 100 kPa). verify (what is ?) Infobox references

1,1,1-Trifluoroethane, or R-143a or simply trifluoroethane, is a hydrofluorocarbon (HFC) compound that is a colorless gas. It should not be confused with the much more commonly used HFC gas R-134a, nor confused with the isomeric compound 1,1,2-trifluoroethane. 1,1,1-Trifluoroethane has a critical temperature of 73 °C.

== Applications ==
Trifluoroethane is used as a refrigerant either by itself or more commonly as a component of blended mixtures. It is also used as a propellant in canned air products used to clean electronic equipment.

== Environmental effects ==
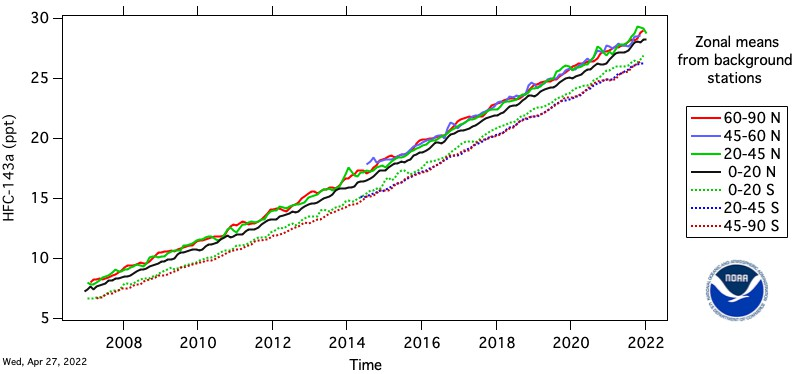
Growth of R-143a concentration in Earth's atmosphere since 2007.

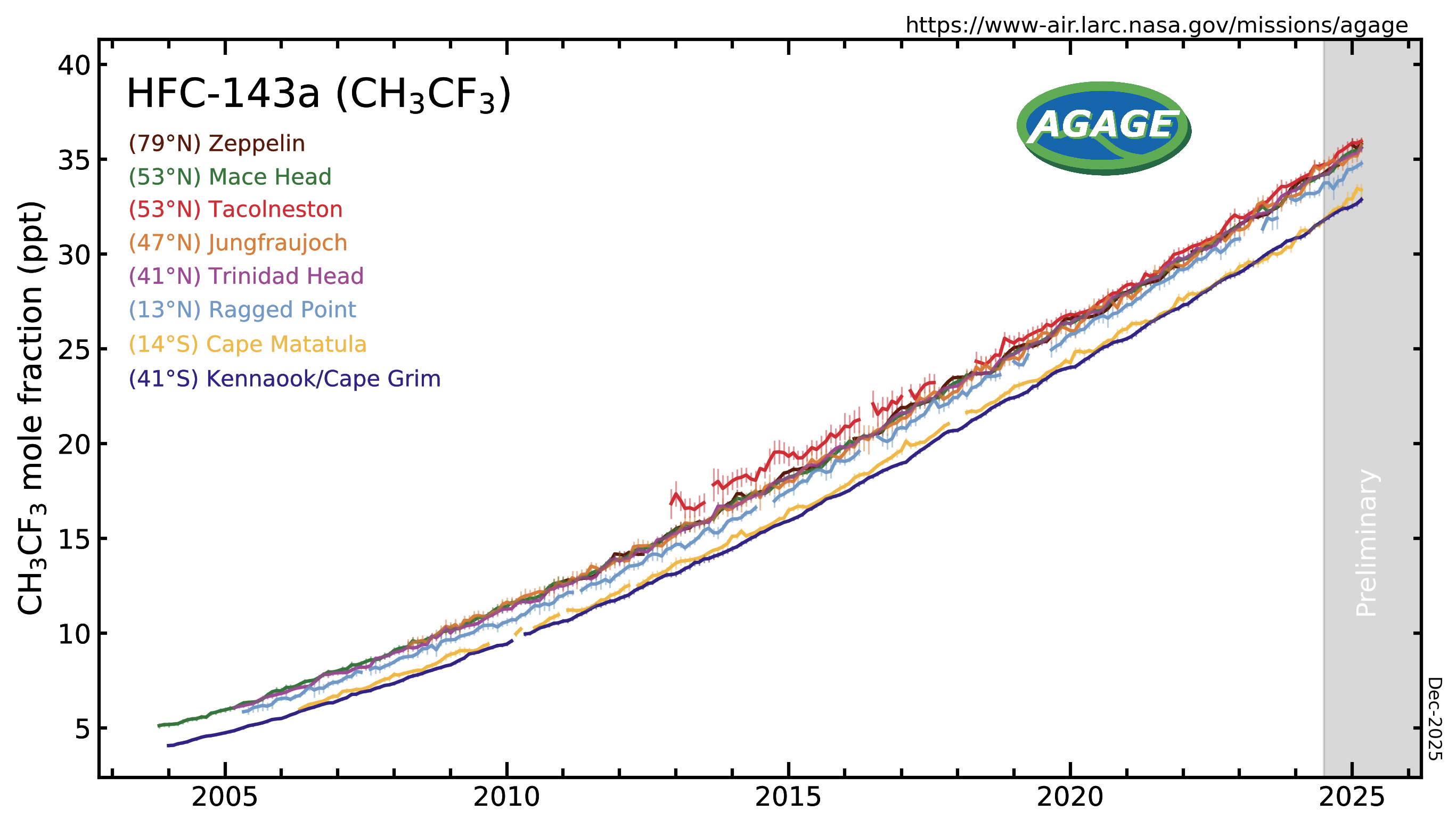
HFC-143a measured by the Advanced Global Atmospheric Gases Experiment (AGAGE) in the lower atmosphere (troposphere) at stations around the world. Abundances are given as pollution free monthly mean mole fractions in parts-per-trillion.

Unlike CFCs used as refrigerants, trifluoroethane has no chlorine atoms and therefore is not ozone-depleting. Its high chemical stability and infra-red absorbency make it a potent greenhouse gas with a lifetime of about 50 years and a global warming potential of 4300, which are at the high end compared to many other commonly used HFC refrigerants. Its abundance in the atmosphere more than doubled from about 10 parts per trillion (ppt) in 2010 to near 25 ppt in 2020.

== See also ==
- List of refrigerants
- IPCC list of greenhouse gases
- inhalants
