= List of gases =

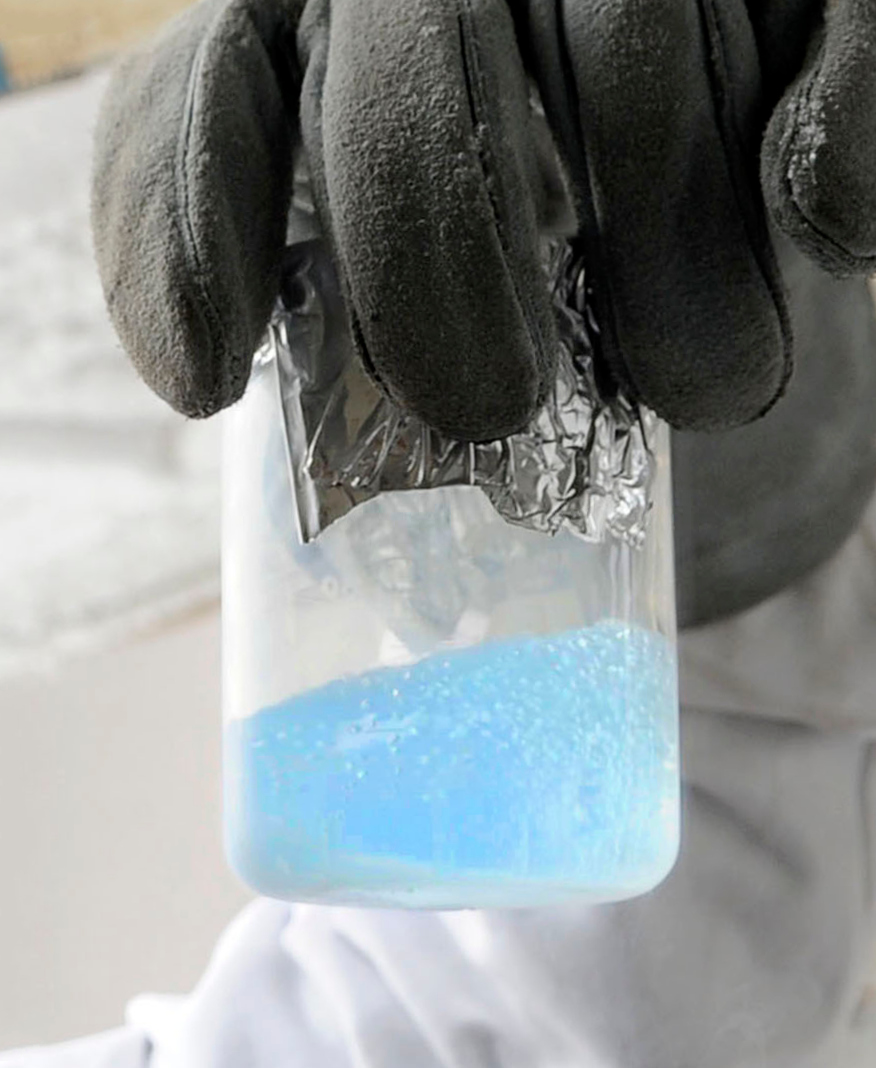
Boiling liquid oxygen

This is a list of gases at standard conditions, which means substances that boil or sublime at or below 25 °C (77 °F) and 1 atm pressure and are reasonably stable.

== List ==
This list is sorted by boiling point of gases in ascending order, but can be sorted on different values. "sub" and "triple" refer to the sublimation point and the triple point, which are given in the case of a substance that sublimes at 1 atm; "dec" refers to decomposition. "~" means approximately. Blue type items have an article available by clicking on the name.

Name	Formula	Boiling pt (°C)	Melting pt (°C)	Molecular weight	CAS No
Helium-3	^{3}He	−269.96	N/A	3	14762-55-1
Helium-4	^{4}He	−268.928	N/A	4	7440-59-7
Hydrogen	H_{2}	−252.879	−259.16	2	1333-74-0
Deuterium	D_{2}	−249.49	−254.43	4	7782-39-0
Tritium	T_{2}	−248.12	−254.54	6	10028-17-8
Neon	Ne	−246.046	−248.59	20	7440-01-9
Nitrogen	N_{2}	−195.795	−210.0	28	7727-37-9
Carbon monoxide	CO	−191.5	−205.02	28	630-08-0
Fluorine	F_{2}	−188.11	−219.67	38	7782-41-4
Argon	Ar	−185.848	−189.34	40	7440-37-1
Oxygen	O_{2}	−182.962	−218.79	32	7782-44-7
Methane	CH_{4}	−161.5	−182.50	16	74-82-8
Krypton	Kr	−153.415	−157.37	84	7439-90-9
Nitric oxide	NO	−151.74	−163.6	30	10102-43-9
Oxygen difluoride	F_{2}O	−144.3	−223.8	54	7783-41-7
Tetrafluoromethane	CF_{4}	−127.8	−183.6	88	75-73-0
Nitrogen trifluoride	NF_{3}	−128.74	−206.79	71	7783-54-2
Silane	SiH_{4}	−111.9	−185	32	7803-62-5
trans-Dinitrogen difluoride	N_{2}F_{2}	−111.45	−172	66	13776-62-0
Ozone	O_{3}	−111.35	−193	48	10028-15-6
Xenon	Xe	−108.099	−111.75	131	7440-63-3
cis-Dinitrogen difluoride	N_{2}F_{2}	−105.75	−195	66	13812-43-6
Ethylene	CH_{2}=CH_{2}	−103.7	−169.2	28	74-85-1
Phosphorus trifluoride	PF_{3}	−101.8	−151.5	88	7783-55-3
Chlorine monofluoride	ClF	−101.1	−155.6	54.5	7790-89-8
Boron trifluoride	BF_{3}	−99.9	−126.8	68	7637-07-2
Fluorosilane	SiH_{3}F	−98.6		50	13537-33-2
Trifluorosilane	SiHF_{3}	−95	−131	86	13465-71-9
Trifluoromethyl hypofluorite	CF_{3}OF	−95	−215	104	373-91-1
Diborane	B_{2}H_{6}	−92.49	−164.85	28	19287-45-7
3,3-Difluorodiazirine	c-CF_{2}N_{2}	−91.3		78	693-85-6
Ethane	CH_{3}CH_{3}	−88.5	−182.8	30	74-84-0
Nitrous oxide	N_{2}O	−88.48	−90.8	44	10024-97-2
Germane	GeH_{4}	−88.1	−165	77	7782-65-2
Phosphine	PH_{3}	−87.75	−133.8	34	7803-51-2
Trifluoramine oxide	NOF_{3}	−87.5	−161	87	13847-65-9
Tetrafluorosilane	SiF_{4}	−86	−90.2	104	7783-61-1
1,1-Difluoroethene	CF_{2}=CH_{2}	−85.5	−144	64	75-38-7
Trifluoronitrosomethane	CF_{3}NO	−85	−196.6	99	334-99-6
Azidotrifluoromethane	CF_{3}N_{3}	−85	−152	111	3802-95-7
Hydrogen chloride	HCl	−85	−114.17	36.5	7647-01-0
Difluorodioxirane	F_{2}COO	≈−85	≤−160	82	96740-99-7
Acetylene	CH≡CH	−84.7	−81.5	26	74-86-2
Phosphorus pentafluoride	PF_{5}	−84.6	−93.8	126	7647-19-0
Carbonyl fluoride	COF_{2}	−84.5	−111.2	66	353-50-4
Difluorodiazomethane	CF_{2}N_{2}	−83		78.02	693-85-6
Fluoroform	CHF_{3}	−82.1	−155.2	70	75-46-7
Chlorotrifluoromethane	CClF_{3}	−81.5	−181	104.5	75-72-9
Bis(difluoroboryl)methane	BF_{2}CF_{2}BF_{2}	−81.4 ?		148	55124-14-6
Trifluoroisocyanomethane	CF_{3}NC	−80		95	105879-13-8
Difluoromethylborane	CH_{3}BF_{2}	−78.5		64	373-64-8
Carbon dioxide	CO_{2}	−78.464 sub	−56.561 triple	44	124-38-9
Fluoromethane	CH_{3}F	−78.4	−137.8	34	593-53-3
Hexafluoroethane	CF_{3}CF_{3}	−78.1	−100.015	138	76-16-4
Pentafluoromethanamine	CF_{3}NF_{2}	−78	−130	121	335-01-3
Difluorosilane	SiH_{2}F_{2}	−77.8	−122	68	13824-36-7
Tetrafluoroethene	CF_{2}=CF_{2}	−76	−131.14	100	116-14-3
Fluoroacetylene	FCCH	−74	−196	44	2713-09-9
Tetrafluorohydrazine	N_{2}F_{4}	−74	−164.5	104	10036-47-2
Nitryl fluoride	NO_{2}F	−72.4	−166	65	10022-50-1
Fluoroethene	CH_{2}CHF	−72	−160.5	46	75-02-5
Chlorotrifluorosilane	SiClF_{3}	−70	−138	120.5	14049-36-6
Trifluoroacetonitrile	CF_{3}CN	−68.8		95	353-85-5
Chlorodifluoroamine	NClF_{2}	−67	−195	87.5	13637-87-1
Hydrogen bromide	HBr	−66.38	−86.80	81	10035-10-6
Difluorophosphine	PHF_{2}	−65	−124	70	14984-74-8
Borane carbonyl	BH_{3}CO	−64	−137	42	13205-44-2
Fluoroperoxytrifluoromethane	CF_{3}OOF	−64		120	
Bis(fluoroxy)difluoromethane	CF_{2}(OF)_{2}	−64		120	16282-67-0
Sulfur hexafluoride	SF_{6}	−63.8	−49.596 triple	146	2551-62-4
Tetrafluorooxirane	C_{2}F_{4}O	−63.5		116	694-17-7
Arsine	AsH_{3}	−62.5	−166	78	7784-42-1
Thiocarbonyl fluoride	CSF_{2}	−62.1	−163.5	82	420-32-6
Radon	Rn	−61.7	−71	222	10043-92-2
Difluorocyanamide	NF_{2}CN	−61	−196	78	7127-18-6
Nitrosyl fluoride	ONF	−59.9	−132.5	49	7789-25-5
Hydrogen sulfide	H_{2}S	−59.55	−85.5	34	7783-06-4
Trifluoroacetyl fluoride	CF_{3}COF	−59	−159.5	116	354-34-7
Hexafluorodimethyl ether	CF_{3}OCF_{3}	−59		154	333-36-8
Bromotrifluoromethane	CBrF_{3}	−57.75	−167.78	149	75-63-8
Difluoroaminooxyperfluoromethane	CF_{3}ONF_{2}	−57.63		137	4217-93-0
Methylsilane	CH_{3}SiH_{3}	−57.5	−156.5	46	992-94-9
Dioxygen difluoride	F_{2}O_{2}	−57 dec	−163.5	70	7783-44-0
Ethenone	CH_{2}=C=O	−56.1	−151	42	463-51-4
Sulfuryl fluoride	SO_{2}F_{2}	−55.4	−135.8	102	2699-79-8
Dichlorofluorosilane	SiHCl_{2}F	−54.3		119	19382-74-2
trans-1,2-Difluoroethene	CHF=CHF	−53.1		64	1630-78-0
Trifluoroethene	CF_{2}=CHF	−53		82	359-11-5
Arsenic pentafluoride	AsF_{5}	−52.8	−79.8	170	7784-36-3
Phosphorothioic trifluoride	PSF_{3}	−52.25	−148.8	120	2404-52-6
Difluoromethane	CH_{2}F_{2}	−52	−136	52	75-10-5
Difluorocarbamyl fluoride	F_{2}NCOF	−52	−152.2	99	2368-32-3
Stannane	SnH_{4}	−51.8	−146	123	2406-52-2
Tetrafluoropropyne	CF_{3}C≡CF	−50.39		112	20174-11-2
Carbonyl sulfide	OCS	−50.2	−138.8	60	463-58-1
Pentafluoroethyl hypofluorite	C_{2}F_{5}OF	−50		154	
Chlorodifluorosilane	SiHClF_{2}	~−50		102.5	80003-43-6
Digallane	Ga_{2}H_{6}	0 dec	−50 sub	145.494	12140-58-8
Thionyl tetrafluoride	SOF_{4}	−48.5	−99.6	124	13709-54-1
3,3,3-Trifluoro-1-propyne	CF_{3}CCH	−48.3		94	661-54-1
Pentafluoroethane	CF_{3}CHF_{2}	−48.1	−100.6	120	354-33-6
Propene	C_{3}H_{6}	−47.6	−185.2	42	115-07-1
Chlorodifluorophosphine	PClF_{2}	−47.3	−164.8	104.5	14335-40-1
Carbonyl chloride fluoride	COClF	−47.2	−148	82.5	353-49-1
1,1,1-Trifluoroethane	CF_{3}CH_{3}	−47	−111.8	84	420-46-2
Trifluoromethyl hypochlorite	CF_{3}OCl	−47	−164	120.5	22082-78-6
Perchloryl fluoride	ClO_{3}F	−46.75	−147	102.5	7616-94-6
Selenium hexafluoride	SeF_{6}	−46.6 sub	−34.6 triple	193	7783-79-1
Cyanogen fluoride	FCN	−46	−82	45	1495-50-7
Fluorine nitrate	FNO_{3}	−46	−175	81	7789-26-6
Pentafluoronitrosoethane	C_{2}F_{5}NO	−45.7		137	354-72-3
Difluoromethylene dihypofluorite	CF_{2}(OF)_{2}	−45.8	−142	120	16282-67-0
cis-1,2-Difluoroethene	CHF=CHF	−45		64	1630-77-9
1,1-Difluoro-1-propene	CH_{3}CH=CF_{2}	−44		78	430-63-7
Dimethylfluoroborane	(CH_{3})_{2}BF	−44		60	353-46-8
Fluoro(trifluoromethyl)silane	CF_{3}SiH_{2}F	−44		118	
Thionyl fluoride	SOF_{2}	−43.8	−110.5	86	7783-42-8
Phosphorus chloride tetrafluoride	PClF_{4}	−43.4	−132	142.5	13498-11-8
Methyldiborane	CH_{3}B_{2}H_{5}	−43		42	23777-55-1
Difluoro(trifluoromethyl)phosphine	CF_{3}PF_{2}	−43		138	1112-04-5
N,N,1,1-Tetrafluoromethylamine	CHF_{2}NF_{2}	−43		103	24708-53-0
Propane	C_{3}H_{8}	−42.25	−187.7	44	74-98-6
Trifluoro(trifluoromethyl)silane	CF_{3}SiF_{3}	−42		154	335-06-8
Bromotrifluorosilane	BrSiF_{3}	−41.7	−70.5	169	14049-39-9
Hydrogen selenide	H_{2}Se	−41.25	−65.73	81	7783-07-5
Chlorodifluoromethane	CHClF_{2}	−40.7	−175.42	86.5	75-45-6
Sulfur tetrafluoride	SF_{4}	−40.45	−125	108	7783-60-0
Hexafluorodiazomethane cis	CF_{3}NNCF_{3}	−40	−127	166	73513-59-4
Phosphoryl fluoride	POF_{3}	−39.7 sub	−39.1 triple	104	13478-20-1
Chloropentafluoroethane	CF_{3}CClF_{2}	−39.1	−99	135.5	76-15-3
Trifluoromethyl difluoroarsine	CF_{3}AsF_{2}	−39		181.93	420-53-1
Tetrafluoro(trifluoromethyl)phosphorane	CF_{3}PF_{4}	−39	−113	176	1184-81-2
tetrafluorophosphorane	PHF_{4}	−39.0	−100	108	13659-66-0
Tellurium hexafluoride	TeF_{6}	−38.9	−37.6 triple	242	7783-80-4
Vinyldifluoroborane	CH_{2}=CHBF_{2}	−38.8	−133.4	76	358-95-2
(Trifluoromethyl)silane	CF_{3}SiH_{3}	−38.3	−124	100	10112-11-5
Heptafluoroethanamine	C_{2}F_{5}NF_{2}	−38.1	−183	171	354-80-3
Tetrafluoroallene	CF_{2}=C=CF_{2}	−38		112	461-68-7
Hexafluorooxetane	C_{3}F_{6}O	−38		166	425-82-1
Trifluoromethanethiol	CF_{3}SH	−37.99	−157.11	102	1493-15-8
Fluoroethane	CH_{3}CH_{2}F	−37.7	−143.2	48	353-36-6
Bis(trifluoromethyl)peroxide	CF_{3}OOCF_{3}	−37		170	927-84-4
Pentafluoropropanenitrile	C_{2}F_{5}CN	−37		145	422-04-8
Perfluorodimethylamine	(CF_{3})_{2}NF	−37		171	359-62-6
Perfluoropropane	C_{3}F_{8}	−36.8	−147.7	188	76-19-7
Germanium tetrafluoride	GeF_{4}	−36.5	−15 triple	149	7783-58-6
Deuterium iodide	DI	−36.15	−51.639 triple		14104-45-1
Cyclopropene	C_{3}H_{4}	−36		40	2781-85-3
Trifluoromethyl fluoroformate	CF_{3}OC(O)F	−36	≈−120	132	3299-24-9
Trifluoromethyl isocyanate	CF_{3}NCO	−36		111	460-49-1
Tetrafluoro-1,2-diazetidine	C_{2}F_{4}N_{2}H_{2}	−36		130	
Hydrogen iodide	HI	−35.5	−50.76	128	10034-85-2
Pentafluorosulfur hypofluorite	SOF_{6}	−35.1	−86	162	15179-32-5
Difluoromethoxy(trifluoro)methane	CF_{3}OCHF_{2}	−35.0	−157	136	3822-68-2
Propadiene	CH_{2}=C=CH_{2}	−34.8	−136	40	463-49-0
Chlorine	Cl_{2}	−34.04	−101.5	71	7782-50-5
Trifluoromethyl fluoroformate	CF_{3}OC(O)F	−34		132	3299-24-9
Diboron tetrafluoride	B_{2}F_{4}	−34	−56	98	13965-73-6
Ammonia	NH_{3}	−33.33	−77.73	17	7664-41-7
Perfluorocyclopropane	-CF_{2}CF_{2}CF_{2}-	−33	−80	150	931-91-9
Trifluoronitromethane	CF_{3}NO_{2}	−32		115	335-02-4
Dichlorodifluorosilane	SiCl_{2}F_{2}	−32	−44	137	18356-71-3
(Difluoroamino)difluoroacetonitrile	NF_{2}CF_{2}CN	−32		128	5131-88-4
Hexafluoromethanediamine	(NF_{2})_{2}CF_{2}	−31.9	−161.9	154	4394-93-8
Fluorine fluorosulfate	FSO_{3}F	−31.3	−158.5	118	13536-85-1
Bis(trifluoromethyl)diazene trans	CF_{3}NNCF_{3}	−31.1		166	372-63-4
Cyclopropane	C_{3}H_{6}	−31	−127.6	42	75-19-4
Chlorosilane	SiH_{3}Cl	−30.4	−118	66.5	13465-78-6
Hexafluoropropylene	CF_{2}=CFCF_{3}	−30.2	−156.6	150	116-15-4
Chloroacetylene	HCCCl	−30	−126	60.5	593-63-5
Methyltrifluorosilane	CH_{3}SiF_{3}	−30	−73	100	373-74-0
Fluorine azide	FN_{3}	−30	−139	61.019	14986-60-8
Dichlorodifluoromethane	CCl_{2}F_{2}	−29.8	−157.7	121	75-71-8
2,3,3,3-Tetrafluoropropene	CF_{3}CF=CH_{2}	−29.5	−152.2	114	754-12-1
Tetrafluorodiaziridine	CF_{4}N_{2}	−29		116	17224-09-8
fluoroxypentafluoroselenium	F_{5}SeOF	−29	−54	209	27218-12-8
Perfluorooxetane	C_{3}OF_{6}	−28.6	−117	166	425-82-1
Chlorotrifluoroethene	CClF=CF_{2}	−28.3	−158.14	116.5	79-38-9
Methyldifluorophosphine	CH_{3}PF_{2}	−28	−110	84	753-59-3
Perfluoroacetone	CF_{3}COCF_{3}	−27.4	−125.45	166	684-16-2
Trifluoro(trifluoromethyl)oxirane	C_{2}OF_{3}CF_{3}	−27.4	−144	166	428-59-1
Thiazyl trifluoride	N≡SF_{3}	−27.1	−72.6	103	15930-75-3
Trifluoroacetyl chloride	CF_{3}COCl	−27	−146	132.5	354-32-5
3,3,3-Trifluoropropene	CF_{3}CH=CH_{2}	−27		96	677-21-4
Phosphonium chloride	PH_{4}Cl	−27 sub		70.5	24567-53-1
Formyl fluoride	HCOF	−26.5	−142.2	48	1493-02-3
1,1,1,2-Tetrafluoroethane	CF_{3}CH_{2}F	−26.1	−103.296	102	811-97-2
Trifluoromethyl trifluorovinyl ether	CF_{3}OCF=CF_{2}	−26		166	1187-93-5
Methyl trifluoromethyl ether	CF_{3}OCH_{3}	−25.2	−149.1	100	421-14-7
Bis(trifluoromethyl)nitroxide	(CF_{3})_{2}NO	−25	−70	168	2154-71-4
Sulfur cyanide pentafluoride	SF_{5}CN	−25	−107	153	1512-13-6
Dimethyl ether	CH_{3}OCH_{3}	−24.8	−141.49	46	115-10-6
1,1,1,4,4,4-Hexafluoro-2-butyne	CF_{3}C≡CCF_{3}	−24.6	−117.4	162	692-50-2
1-Chloro-1-fluoroethene	CClF=CH_{2}	−24.1		80.5	2317-91-1
1,1-Difluoroethane	CHF_{2}CH_{3}	−24.05	−118.6	66	75-37-6
2-Fluoropropene	CH_{3}CF=CH_{2}	−24		60	1184-60-7
Borirane	C_{2}H_{4}BH	−24	−129	40	39517-80-1
Chloromethane	CH_{3}Cl	−23.8	−97.4	50.5	74-87-3
Trifluoronitrosoethylene	CF_{2}=CFNO	−23.7		111	2713-04-4
Pentafluoro(trifluoromethoxy)ethane	C_{2}F_{5}OCF_{3}	−23.6		204	665-16-7
Difluoramine	NHF_{2}	−23.6	−116	53	10405-27-3
1,1-Difluorocyclopropane	CF_{2}CH_{2}CH_{2}	−23.5		78	558-29-2
Propyne or methylacetylene	CH_{3}CCH	−23.2	−103.0	40	74-99-7
Diazomethane	CH_{2}N_{2}	−23	−145	42	334-88-3
Methylgermane	CH_{3}GeH_{3}	−23	−158	91	1449-65-6
Prop-1-en-1-one or methylketene	CH_{3}CH=CO	−23	−80	56	6004-44-0
Vinylsilane	CH_{2}=CHSiH_{3}	−22.8		58	7291-09-0
Trifluoroiodomethane	CF_{3}I	−22.5	−110	196	2314-97-8
Ethynylsilane	HC≡CSiH_{3}	−22.5		56	1066-27-9
Bis(trifluoromethyl) sulfide	(CF_{3})_{2}S	−22.2		170.08	371-78-8
Hexafluoro-1,3-dioxolane	c-CF_{2}OCF_{2}OCF_{2}-	−22.1		182.02	21297-65-4
Chloromethane sulfonyl chloride	CH_{2}ClS(O)(O)Cl	−22		149	3518-65-8
Trifluoromethyl peroxychloride	CF_{3}OOCl	−21.9	−132	136.5	32755-26-3
Carbonyl selenide	COSe	−21.7	−124.4	107	1603-84-5
Trifluoromethanesulfonyl fluoride	CF_{3}SOF	−21.7		136	335-05-7
Chlorine trifluoride dioxide	ClO_{2}F_{3}	−21.6	−81.2	124.5	38680-84-1
Carbonyl bromide fluoride	COBrF	−21		127	753-56-0
Bromopentafluoroethane	C_{2}BrF_{5}	−21		199	354-55-2
Cyanogen	NCCN	−21	−27.83	52	460-19-5
Methoxysilane	CH_{3}OSiH_{3}	−21	−98.5	62	2171-96-2
1,1,3,3,3-Pentafluoropropene	CF_{2}=CHCF_{3}	−21	-153	132	690-27-7
Carbonyl bromide fluoride	CBrFO	−20.6		127	753-56-0
Trifluoromethylsulfur pentafluoride	CF_{3}SF_{5}	−20.4	−87	196	373-80-8
Chlorotrifluorogermane	GeClF_{3}	−20.3	−66.2	165.5	14188-40-0
Trimethylborane	(CH_{3})_{3}B	−20.2	−159.93	56	593-90-8
Dimethylsilane	(CH_{3})_{2}SiH_{2}	−20	−150	60	1111-74-6
Perfluorovinylacetylene	F_{2}C=CF−C≡CF	−20		126.03	667-28-7
1,1,2,2-Tetrafluoroethane	CHF_{2}CHF_{2}	−19.9	−89	102	359-35-3
Formaldehyde	H_{2}CO	−19.1	−92	30	50-00-0
Hexafluorodisilane	SiF_{3}SiF_{3}	−19.1	−18.7 triple	170	13830-68-7
Sulfur chloride pentafluoride	SClF_{5}	−19.05	−64	158.5	13780-57-9
1-Chloro-2,2-difluoroethene	CHCl=CF_{2}	−18.8	−138.5	98.5	359-10-4
E-1,2,3,3,3-Pentafluoropropene	CFH=CFCF_{3}	−18.7		132	5595-10-8
1,1,1,2,2-Pentafluoropropane	CF_{3}CF_{2}CH_{3}	−18		133	1814-88-6
Fluoral	CF_{3}CHO	−18		98	75-90-1
2-Chloro-1,1-difluoroethylene	CF_{2}=CHCl	−17.7	−138.5	98	359-10-4
Difluoroamino sulfur pentafluoride	NF_{2}SF_{5}	−17.5		179	13693-10-2
Stibine	SbH_{3}	−17	−88	125	7803-52-3
1,1,2,2,3,3,3-Heptafluoropropane	CF_{2}HCF_{2}CF_{3}	−17	−148.5	170	2252-84-8
1,1,1,2,3,3,3-Heptafluoropropane	CF_{3}CHFCF_{3}	−16.34	−126.8	170	431-89-0
Phosphorus(III) bromide difluoride	PBrF_{2}	−16.1	−133.8	149	15597-40-7
Methylphosphine	CH_{3}PH_{2}	−16		48	593-54-4
Fluorine perchlorate	FOClO_{3}	−16	−167.3	118.5	10049-03-3
Bis(trifluoromethyl) trioxide	CF_{3}OOOCF_{3}	−16	−138	186	
1,3,3,3-Tetrafluoropropene	CF_{3}CH=CHF	−16	−104.53	114	1645-83-6
N,N-Difluoromethanamine	CH_{3}NF_{2}	−15.9	−114.8	67	753-58-2
1-Trifluoromethyl-1,2,2-trifluorocyclopropane	CF_{3}C_{3}H_{2}F_{3}	−15.8		152	
Disiloxane	(SiH_{3})_{2}O	−15.2	−144	78	13597-73-4
cis-1-Fluoropropene	CH_{3}CH=CHF	−15		60	19184-10-2
trans-1-Fluoropropene	CH_{3}CH=CHF	−15?		60	20327-65-5
Nitryl chloride	NO_{2}Cl	−15	−145	81.5	13444-90-1
Chlorazide	ClN_{3}	−15	−100	77.47	13973-88-1
Disilane	Si_{2}H_{6}	−14.8	−129.4	62	1590-87-0
Z-1,2,3,3,3-Pentafluoropropene	CHF=CFCF_{3}	−14.7		132	5528-43-8
Bromodifluoromethane	CHBrF_{2}	−14.6	−145	131	1511-62-2
Chloroethene	CH_{2}=CHCl	−13.8	−153.84	62.5	75-01-4
Monoethylsilane	CH_{3}CH_{2}SiH_{3}	−13.7	−180	60	2814-79-1
Chlorine pentafluoride	ClF_{5}	−13.1	−103	130.5	13637-63-3
Perfluorocyclopropene	-CF=CFCF_{2}-	−13	−60	112	19721-29-0
1,1,1-Trifluoropropane	CF_{3}CH_{2}CH_{3}	−13		98	421-07-8
1-Chloro-1,1,2,2-tetrafluoroethane	CClF_{2}CHF_{2}	−13	−117	135.5	354-25-6
Carboimidic difluoride	CF_{2}NH	−13 dec	−90	65	2712-98-3
Plumbane	PbH_{4}	−13		211	15875-18-0
Methyl nitrite	CH_{3}NO_{2}	−12	−16	61	624-91-9
Trifluoromethylarsine	CF_{3}AsH_{2}	−12		146	420-42-8
1-Chloro-1,2,2,2-tetrafluoroethane	CHClFCF_{3}	−11.96	−199.15	136.5	2837-89-0
Isobutane	(CH_{3})_{2}CHCH_{2}	−11.7	−159.42	58	75-28-5
Trifluoromethoxy sulfur pentafluoride	CF_{3}OSF_{5}	−11	−143	212	1873-23-0
Trifluoromethylarsenic tetrafluoride	CF_{3}AsF_{4}	−11		219.93	1519-13-7
Thiothionyl fluoride	SSF_{2}	−10.6	−164.6	102	101947-30-2
Sulfur dioxide	SO_{2}	−10.05	−75.5	64	7446-09-5
Pentafluorocyclopropane	-CHFCF_{2}CF_{2}-	−10	−10	132	872-58-2
2-Fluoropropane	CH_{3}CHFCH_{3}	−10		62	420-26-8
Pentafluoroethyl hypochlorite	C_{2}F_{5}OCl	−10±		170.5	22675-67-8
Fluoroformyl sulfurpentafluoride	SF_{5}C(O)F	−10		174	
Trifluoromethyl fluoroformyl peroxide	CF_{3}OOC(O)F	~−10		148	16118-40-4
Perfluorodimethoxymethane	CF_{3}OCF_{2}OCF_{3}	−10	−161	220	53772-78-4
1-Chloro-1,1-difluoroethane	CClF_{2}CH_{3}	−9.6	−130.8	100.5	75-68-3
Chlorofluoromethane	CH_{2}ClF	−9.1	−133.0	68.5	593-70-4
Pentafluoroethyl isocyanate	C_{2}F_{5}NCO	−9		157	356-74-1
Bis(trifluoromethyl)chloramine	(CF_{3})_{2}NCl	−9		187.5	
Selenium dioxydifluoride	SeO_{2}F_{2}	−8.4	−99.5	149	14984-81-7
Fluoro(trifluoro-methyl)diazine	CF_{4}N_{2}O	−7.63		132	815-10-1
Isobutene	(CH_{3})_{2}C=CH_{2}	−7.0	−140.7	56	115-11-7
3-Fluoropropene	CH_{2}=CHCH_{2}F	−7		60	818-92-8
Bis(trifluoromethyl)amine	(CF_{3})_{2}NH	−7		153	371-77-7
Ethoxytrifluorosilane	CH_{3}H_{2}OSiF_{3}	−7	−122	118	460-55-9
Trifluoromethylsulfur trifluoride	CF_{3}SF_{3}	−7	−110	158	374-10-7
Perfluoro-2-methyl-1,2-oxazetidine	(CF_{3}-N)CF_{2}CF_{2}O	−6.8		199	
Tris(trifluoromethyl)-amine	(CF_{3})_{3}N	−6.5		221	432-03-1
Methylamine	CH_{3}NH_{2}	−6.4	−93.42	31	74-89-5
1-Butene	CH_{2}=CHCH_{2}CH_{3}	−6.3	−185.33	56	106-98-9
Diphosphorus tetrafluoride	P_{2}F_{4}	−6.2	−86.5	138	13824-74-3
Chloryl fluoride	ClO_{2}F	−6	−115	86.5	13637-83-7
Trifluoromethyl iminosulfur difluoride	CF_{3}N=SF_{2}	−6		153	1512-14-7
Perfluorocyclobutane	-CF_{2}CF_{2}CF_{2}CF_{2}-	−5.91	−40.16	200	115-25-3
Perfluoro-2-butene	CF_{3}CCF=CF_{3}	−5.9		200	360-89-4 trans
Nitrosyl chloride	ONCl	−5.55	−59.4	65.5	2696-92-6
Difluorocarbamoyl chloride	CClF_{2}NO	−5.5		115.5	16847-30-6
Hexafluoro 1,2-dioxolane	-CF_{2}CF_{2}CF_{2}OO-	−5	−115.5	182.02	
2,3,3,3-tetrafluoro-2-(trifluoromethyl)-propanenitrile	N≡CCF(CF_{3})_{2}	−4.7	−118	195.038	42532-60-5
1,3-Butadiene	CH_{2}=CHCH=CH_{2}	−4.6	−108.9	54	106-99-0
Ethyltrifluorosilane	CH_{3}CH_{2}SiF_{3}	−4.4	−105	114	353-89-9
Difluoro-N-fluoromethanimine	F_{2}C=NF	−4		83	338-66-9
Perfluoro-1,2-butadiene	CF_{3}CF=C=CF_{2}	−4		162.03	550-44-7
1,1-Dimethyldiborane	(CH_{3})_{2}B(μ-H)_{2}BH_{2}	−4	−150.2	56	16924-32-6
trans-1-Chloro-2-fluoroethene	CHCl=CHF	−4		80.5	2268-32-8
Bromochlorodifluoromethane	CF_{2}ClBr	−3.7	−159.5	165.5	353-59-3
N-Nitroso-bis(trifluoromethyl)amine	ONN(CF_{3})_{2}	−3.5		182	
Trifluoromethyl 1,1,2,2-tetrafluoroethyl ether	CF_{3}OCF_{2}CF_{2}H	−3.3	−141	186	2356-61-8
1-Fluoropropane	CH_{2}FCH_{2}CH_{3}	−3.2	−159	62	460-13-9
3-Fluoropropene	CH_{2}CHCH_{2}F	−3		60	818-92-8
Dimethylperoxide	CH_{3}OOCH_{3}	−3	−100	62	690-02-8
Trifluoromethyl thionitrite	CF_{3}SNO	−3		131	
Hydrogen astatide	HAt (theoretical)	−3		211	13464-71-6
Dichlorodifluorogermane	GeCl_{2}F_{2}	−2.8	−51.8	182	24422-21-7
Bromotrifluoroethene	CBrF=CF_{2}	−2.5		161	598-73-2
Trifluoromethane sulfinyl fluoride	CF_{3}SOF	−2.5		136	812-12-4
Perfluorobutane	C_{4}F_{10}	−2.1	−129	238	355-25-9
Hydrogen telluride	H_{2}Te	−2	−49	130	7783-09-7
1-Chloroheptafluoropropane	CF_{3}CF_{2}CF_{2}Cl	−2		204.5	422-86-6
2-Chloroheptafluoropropane	CF_{3}CFClCF_{3}	−2		204.5	76-18-6
Bis(trifluoromethyl)selenium	(CF_{3})_{2}Se	−2		217	371-79-9
Trifluoromethyl sulfinyl fluoride	CF_{3}S(O)F	−1.6		136	812-12-4
1,1,1,2,2,3-Hexafluoropropane	CF_{3}CF_{2}CFH_{2}	−1.44	−98.38	152	677-56-5
1,1,1,3,3,3-Hexafluoropropane	CF_{3}CH_{2}CF_{3}	−1.4	−93.6	152	690-39-1
Pentafluoroguanidine	CF_{5}N_{3}	−1		149	10051-06-6
Trifluoromethyl sulfenyl chloride	CF_{3}SCl	−1	−137	136.52	421-17-0
1,1,2,2-Tetrafluoropropane	CHF_{2}CF_{2}CH_{3}	−0.8	−121.1	116	40723-63-5
Heptafluoronitrosopropane	C_{3}F_{7}NO	−0.7		199	354-72-3
1,1,1,2-Tetrafluoropropane	CF_{3}CHFCH_{3}	−1-0		116	421-48-7
1,1,2,2,3,3-Hexafluoropropane	CHF_{2}CF_{2}CHF_{2}	−0.3	−98.38	152	680-00-2
Butane	C_{4}H_{10}	0	−140	58	106-97-8
2,2-Difluoropropane	CH_{3}CF_{2}CH_{3}	0	−104.8	80	420-45-1
Perfluoroisobutane	C_{4}F_{10}	0		238	354-92-7
Nitrosyl bromide	NOBr	0	−56	110	13444-87-6
Xenon tetroxide	XeO_{4}	0 dec	−35.9	195	12340-14-6
Trifluoromethylsulfonyl hypofluorite	CF_{3}SO_{2}OF	0	−87	168	
Trifluoromethyl chloroformate	CF_{3}OC(O)Cl	0		148.5	23213-83-4
Decafluorodiethyl ether	CF_{3}CF_{2}OCF_{2}CF_{3}	0		254	358-21-4
Perfluorocyclobutanone	-CF_{2}CF_{2}CF_{2}C(O)-	0		178	699-35-4
Trifluoromethyl peroxonitrate	CF_{3}OONO_{2}	0.4		147	50311-48-3
Thiazyl fluoride	NSF	0.4	−89	65.07	18820-63-8
Perfluorotetrahydrofuran	-OCF_{2}CF_{2}CF_{2}CF_{2}-	0.6	−85	216	773-14-8
pentafluorotellurium hypofluorite	F_{5}TeOF	0.6			
Tetrafluoro(trifluoromethylimino)-λ^{6}-sulfane	F_{4}S=NCF_{3}	0.75±0.25		191	
trans-2-Butene	CH_{3}CH=CHCH_{3}	0.9	−43.3	56	624-64-6
Methylcyclopropane	CH_{3}CHCH_{2}CH_{2}	1	−177.2	56	594-11-6
Bis(trifluoromethyl)phosphine	(CF_{3})_{2}PH	1		170	460-96-8
Oxalyl fluoride	CFOCFO	1±1	−12.42	94	359-40-0
Methylstannane	CH_{3}SnH_{3}	1.4		137	1631-78-3
Azomethane	CH_{3}N=NCH_{3}	1.5	−78	58	503-28-6
1,1,2,3,3-Pentafluoropropene	CF_{2}=CFCHF_{2}	1.5	−101.2	132	433-66-9
Bromosilane	SiH_{3}Br	1.9	−94	111	13465-73-1
Methylarsine	CH_{3}AsH_{2}	2	−143	92	593-52-2
Perfluorocyclobutene	(CF_{2})_{2}(CF)_{2}	2	−60	162	697-11-0
Dichlorine monoxide	Cl_{2}O	2.2	−120.6	87	7791-21-1
Cyclobutene	C_{4}H_{6}	2.5		54	822-35-5
Difluorodimethylsilane	(CH_{3})_{2}SiF_{2}	2.5	−87.5	96	353-66-2
1,1,1-Trifluoroazomethane	CF_{3}NNCH_{3}	2.5		112	690-21-1
dichorotrifluorophosphorane	PCl_{2}F_{3}	2.5	−124	159	13659-65-9
Trimethylamine	(CH_{3})_{3}N	2.8	−117.1	59	75-50-3
1,1-Dichloro-1,2,2,2-tetrafluoroethane	CCl_{2}FCF_{3}	3	−56.6	152	374-07-2
Sulfur bromide pentafluoride	SBrF_{5}	3.1	−79	207	15607-89-3
1,1,2-Trifluoroethane	CHF_{2}CH_{2}F	3.5	−84	84	430-66-0
1,2-Dichloro-1,1,2,2-tetrafluoroethane	CClF_{2}CClF_{2}	3.6	−92.52	171	76-14-2
cis-2-Butene	CH_{3}CH=CHCH_{3}	3.72	−138.9	56	590-18-1
Phosphorus dihydride trifluoride	PH_{2}F_{3}	3.9	−52	90	
Bromomethane	CH_{3}Br	4	−93.66	95	74-83-9
1,2-Dimethyldiborane	[(CH_{3})BH_{2}]_{2}	4	−124.9	56	17156-88-6
Selenium chloride pentafluoride	SeClF_{5}	4.5	−19	209.5	34979-62-9
1,1,4,4-Tetrafluoro-1,3-butadiene	CF_{2}=CFCF=CF_{2}	4.5±		162	407-70-5
Trifluoromethyl phosphorodifluoridate	CF_{3}OP(O)F_{2}	4.6	−96.2	170	39125-43-4
Bromoacetylene	C_{2}HBr	4.7		105	593-61-3
Iodine heptafluoride	IF_{7}	4.8	6.5 triple	250	16921-96-3
Dimethylchloroborane	(CH_{3})_{2}BCl	4.9	−39.9	76.5	1803-36-7
Perfluoro-1-butene	CF_{3}CF_{2}CF=CF_{2}	5		200	357-26-6
Pentafluorosulfanyl cyanate	F_{5}SOCN	5-5.5	−60	169	
1,1,2,3,4,4-Hexafluoro-1,3-butadiene	CF_{2}CFCFCF_{2}	5.4	−132	162	685-63-2
Bis(difluoromethyl) ether	CHF_{2}OCHF_{2}	5.5		118	1691-17-4
Methyl pentafluoroethyl ether	CH_{3}OC_{2}F_{5}	5.6		140	22410-44-2
Tris(difluoroamine)fluoromethane	(NF_{2})_{3}CF	5.6	−136.9	187	14362-68-6
Perfluoro ethyl methyl ether	C_{2}F_{5}OCF_{3}	5.61		204	
1-Bromo-2,2-difluoro-ethylene	CHBr=CF_{2}	5.7		143	
Perfluoro-1,3-butadiene	CF_{2}=CFCF=CF_{2}	5.8	−132	162	685-63-2
Methanethiol	CH_{3}SH	5.95	−123	48	74-93-1
Vinylacetylene	H_{2}C=CH−C≡CH	6		54	689-97-4
Methoxyethane	CH_{3}OC_{2}H_{5}	6	−113	60	540-67-0
Methyl vinyl ether	CH_{3}OCH=CH_{2}	6	−122	58	107-25-5
1,1,1-Trifluoro-2-chloroethane	CF_{3}CH_{2}Cl	6.1	−105.5	118.5	75-88-7
1,1,1,2,3,3-Hexafluoropropane	CF_{3}CH_{2}CF_{3}	6.2		152	431-63-0
Phosphorothioic chloride difluoride	PSClF_{2}	6.3	−155.2	136.5	2524-02-9
Perfluoro-2-methoxypropionylfluoride	CF_{3}OCF(CF_{3})C(O)F	5-8		232	
Trimethylsilane	(CH_{3})_{3}SiH	6.7	−153.9	74	993-07-7
Carbon suboxide	OCCCO	6.8	−111.3	68	504-64-3
2-Chloropentafluoropropene	CF_{3}CCl=CF_{2}	6.8		166.5	2804-50-4
dimethylgermane	CH_{3}GeH_{2}CH_{3}	7.0		104.72	1449-64-5
Perfluoroisobutene	(CF_{3})_{2}C=CF_{2}	7	−130	200	382-21-8
Pentafluoroethyl trifluorovinyl ether	CF_{3}CF_{2}OCFCF_{2}	7		216	10493-43-3
1,1-Difluoropropane	CHF_{2}CH_{2}CH_{3}	7-8		80	430-61-5
1,1,1,2,4,4,4-Heptafluoro-2-butene	CF_{3}CF=CHCF_{3}	7-8		182	
Chloromethylsilane	CH_{3}ClSi	7	−135	78.5	993-00-0
Fluoromethyldifluoroborane	CH_{2}FBF_{2}	7	−47	82	
Nitryl cyanide	NCNO_{2}	7	−85	72	105879-05-8
Silylgermane	GeH_{3}SiH_{3}	7.0	−119.7	107	13768-63-3
Phosphorus(V) dichloride trifluoride	PCl_{2}F_{3}	7.1	−125	159	13454-99-4
Sulfuryl chloride fluoride	SO_{2}ClF	7.1	−124.7	118.5	13637-84-8
Dimethylamine	(CH_{3})_{2}NH	7.3	−93	45	124-40-3
3-Chloropentafluoropropene	CF_{2}ClCF=CF_{2}	7.4		166.5	79-47-0
Phosgene	COCl_{2}	7.5	−127.77	99	75-44-5
Chloropentafluoroacetone	CClF_{2}COCF_{3}	7.8	−133	182.5	79-53-8
1-Butyne	CH_{3}CH_{2}C≡CH	8.08	−125.7	54	107-00-6
Dichlorosilane	SiH_{2}Cl_{2}	8.3	−122	101	4109-96-0
trans-1,1,1,4,4,4-hexafluoro-2-butene	CF_{3}CH=CHCF_{3}	8.5		164	407-60-3
2-Bromo-1,1,1,2-tetrafluoroethane	CF_{3}CHFBr	8.65		181	124-72-1
Methyl chlorosilane	CH_{3}SiH_{2}Cl	8.7	−134.1	80.5	993-00-0
Pentafluorosulfanyl hypochlorite	SF_{5}OCl	8.9		178.5	
Dichlorofluoromethane	CHCl_{2}F	8.92	−135	103	75-43-4
ethylgermane	CH_{3}CH_{2}GeH_{3}	9.2		104.66	1747-99-5
Neopentane	(CH_{3})_{4}C	9.5	−16.5	72	463-82-1
Trifluoromethylperchlorate	CF_{3}OClO_{3}	9.5		168.5	52003-45-9
1,3-Butadiyne	HC≡CC≡CH	10	−35	50	460-12-8
N-Nitroso-O,N-bis(trifluoromethyl)-hydroxylamine or O-Nitroso-bis(trifluoromethy1)hydroxylamine	CF_{3}(CF_{3}O)NNO or (CF_{3})_{2}NONO	10		198	367-54-4
Ethylene oxide	CH_{2}OCH_{2}	10.4	−112.46	44	75-21-8
1,2-Difluoroethane	CH_{2}FCH_{2}F	10.5	−118.6	66	624-72-6
1,2-Butadiene	CH_{3}CH=C=CH_{2}	11	−136.20	54	590-19-2
Dichloromethylborane	CH_{3}BCl_{2}	11		97	7318-78-7
Chlorine dioxide	ClO_{2}	11	−59	67.5	10049-04-4
2-Chloro-2,3,3,3-tetrafluoropropanoyl fluoride	CF_{3}CFClC(O)F	11		182.5	28627-00-1
Methyl trifluorovinyl ether	CH_{3}OCF=CF_{2}	11		112	3823-94-7
Trifluoromethyl hydroperoxide	CF_{3}OOH	11.3		102	16156-36-8
Methyl trifluoromethyl sulfide	CH_{3}SCF_{3}	11.5		116	421-16-9
Chlorine trifluoride	ClF_{3}	11.75	−76.34	92.5	7790-91-2
1-bromoheptafluoropropane	CF_{3}CF_{2}CF_{2}Br	12		249	422-85-5
Tert-butyl fluoride	(CH_{3})_{3}CF	12		76	353-61-7
Bis(trifluoromethyl)diazomethane	(CF_{3})_{2}CN_{2}	12	−132	178.04	371-77-7
1,1,1,2,2,3,3,4,4-Nonafluorobutane	CF_{3}CF_{2}CF_{2}CF_{2}H	12		220	375-17-7
2-Fluoro-2-methylpropane	CH_{3}(CH_{3})CFCH_{3}	12.1		76	353-61-7
Trichlorofluorosilane	SiCl_{3}F	12.25		153.5	14965-52-7
Chloroethane	CH_{3}CH_{2}Cl	12.27	−138	64.5	75-00-3
Pentafluoroiodoethane	CF_{3}CF_{2}I	12.5	−92	246	354-64-3
Cyclobutane	C_{4}H_{8}	12.5	−90.7	56	287-23-0
1,1-difluoro-N-(pentafluoro-λ^{6}-sulfanyl)methanimine	F_{5}SN=CF_{2}	12.5±0.5		191	
2-diazo-1,1,1,3,3,3-hexafluoropropane	(CF_{3})_{2}CN_{2}	12.5±0.5		178	684-23-1
Silylphosphine	SiH_{3}PH_{2}	12.7		64	14616-47-8
Cyanogen chloride	ClCN	13	−6.55	61.5	506-77-4
trans-1-Bromo-1,2-difluoroethylene	CBrF=CFH	13		143	358-99-6
Trifluoromethyl phosphine	CF_{3}PH_{2}	13.1		102	420-52-0
2,2,2-Trifluorodiazoethane	CF_{3}CHNN	13.2		91	371-67-5
2-Chloro-1,1,1,2-tetrafluoropropane HCFC-244bb	CF_{3}CClFCH_{3}	13.23		150.5	421-73-8
Pentafluoroethyl sulfur pentafluoride	C_{2}F_{5}SF_{5}	13.5		246	
Phosphorus(III) dichloride fluoride	PCl_{2}F	13.85	−144	121	15597-63-4
2-Chloro-1,1,1,3,3,3-hexafluoropropane	CF_{3}CHClCF_{3}	14	−120.8	186.5	51346-64-6
2-Chloro-3,3,3-trifluoroprop-1-ene	CH_{2}=CClCF_{3}	14		130.5	2730-62-3
2-(Pentafluorothio)-3,3-difluorooxaziridine	SF_{5}(-NCF_{2}O-)	14.0		207	73002-62-7
Difluoro(difluorochloromethyl)amine	CClF_{2}NF_{2}	14.14		137.5	13880-71-2
Nitrosyl bromide	ONBr	14.5		110	13444-87-6
Hexafluoroisobutylene	(CF_{3})_{2}C=CH_{2}	14.5		164	382-10-5
N,N-Difluoroethylamine	CH_{3}CH_{2}NF_{2}	14.9	−150.3	81	758-18-9
Disulfur difluoride	FSSF	15	−133	102	13709-35-8
cis-1-Chloro-2-fluoroethene	CHCl=CHF	15		80.5	2268-31-7
(Z)-1-chloro-2,3,3,3-tetrafluoropropene	CHCl=CFCF_{3}	15		148.5	111512-60-8
1,1,1,3,3-Pentafluoropropane	CF_{3}CH_{2}CHF_{2}	15.14	−102.10	134	460-73-1
Trifluoromethyl phosphorodifluoroperoxoate	CF_{3}OOP(O)F_{2}	15.5	−88.6	167	39125-42-3
(Trifluoroacetyl)sulfur pentafluoride	CF_{3}C(O)SF_{5}	15.6	−112	224	82390-51-0
Vinyl bromide	CH_{2}=CHBr	15.8	−137.8	107	593-60-2
Bis(fluorocarbonyl) peroxide	CF(O)OOCFO	15.9	−42.5	126	692-74-0
1-Chloro-1,1,2-trifluoroethane	CClF_{2}CH_{2}F	16		118.5	421-04-5
cis-1-Bromo-1,2-difluoroethylene	CBrF=CHF	16		143	
1-Fluoro-2-methylpropane	CH_{2}FCHCH_{3}CH_{3}	16		76	359-00-2
Difluoromethyl 1,1,2-trifluoroethyl ether	CHF_{2}OCF_{2}CH_{2}F	16.14		150	69948-24-9
1-Chloro-1-fluoroethane	CHClFCH_{3}	16.15		82.5	1615-75-4
Fluorotrimethylsilane	(CH_{3})_{3}SiF	16.4	−74.3	92	420-56-4
Bis(trifluoromethyl)nitramine	(CF_{3})_{2}NNO_{2}	16.4		198	
Hexafluoroacetone imine	CF_{3}C(=NH)CF_{3}	16.5±	−47	165	1645-75-6
Dichloro(trifluoromethyl)amine	CF_{3}NCl_{2}	16.6		154	13880-73-4
Ethylamine	CH_{3}CH_{2}NH_{2}	16.6	−81	45	75-04-7
1,1,1-Trifluorobutane	CF_{3}CH_{2}CH_{2}CH_{3}	16.74	−114.79	112	460-34-4
Bismuthine	BiH_{3}	17	−67	212	18288-22-7
2,2,3,3-Tetrafluorobutane	CH_{3}CF_{2}CF_{2}CH_{3}	17		130	421-74-9
tris(trifluoromethyl)phosphine	(CF_{3})_{3}P	17		238	432-04-2
Tungsten hexafluoride	WF_{6}	17.1	1.9	294	7783-82-6
1-Chloro-1,2,2-trifluoroethane	CHClFCHF_{2}	17.3		99.5	431-07-2
Ethyl nitrite	C_{2}H_{5}NO_{2}	17.5		75	109-95-5
Tetraborane(10)	B_{4}H_{10}	18	−120	54	18283-93-7
trifluoro-(sulfinylamino)methane	CF_{3}N=S=O	18		131	10564-49-5
F-2,3-dihydro-1,4-dioxin (2,2,3,3,5,6-Hexafluoro-2,3-dihydro-1,4-dioxine)	-CF_{2}CF_{2}OCF=CFO-	18.5		158	56625-38-8
Bromofluoromethane	CH_{2}BrF	19 (CRC=23)		113	373-52-4
Bis(trifluoromethyl)arsine	(CF_{3})_{2}AsH	19		214	
1,1-Dichloro-2,2-difluoroethene	CCl_{2}=CF_{2}	19	−116	135	79-35-6
Perfluorovinylsulphur pentafluoride	CF_{2}=CFSF_{5}	19		208	1186-51-2
Difluorotris(trifluoromethyl)phosphorane	(CF_{3})_{3}PF_{2}	19		276	661-45-0
trans-1-Chloro-3,3,3-trifluoropropene	CHCl=CHCF_{3}	19		130.5	102687-65-0
Fluoroformic acid anhydride	FC(O)OC(O)F	19.2	−46.2	110	177036-04-3
Trifluorovinyl isocyanate	CF_{2}=CFNCO	19.5		123	41594-57-4
Hydrogen fluoride	HF	20	−83.36	20	7664-39-3
Bis(trifluoromethyl)carbamoyl fluoride	(CF_{3})_{2}NC(O)F	20		199.03	359-54-6
Bromine monofluoride	BrF	20 dec	−33	99	13863-59-7
Perbromyl fluoride	BrO_{3}F	20 dec	−110	147	25251-03-0
1-Chloro-1,1,2,2-tetrafluoropropane	CF_{2}ClCF_{2}CH_{3}	20		150.5	421-75-0
Perfluorooxaspiro[2.3]hexane	C_{5}F_{8}O	18-21		228	
pentafluoroethylsulfinyl fluoride	C_{2}F_{5}S(O)F	20		186	20621-31-2
3-Methyl-1-butene	CH_{2}=CHCH(CH_{3})_{2}	20.1	−168.41	70	563-45-1
Acetaldehyde	CH_{3}CHO	20.2	−123.37	44	75-07-0
Chlorotetrafluoro(trifluoromethyl)sulfur	CF_{3}SClF_{4}	20.2		212.5	42179-04-4
trans-Bis(trifluoromethyl)sulfur tetrafluoride	CF_{3}SF_{4}CF_{3}	20.5		246	42179-02-2
1,1-Dimethylcyclopropane	(CH_{3})_{2}CCH_{2}CH_{2}	21	−109.0	70	1630-94-0
Acetyl fluoride	CH_{3}C(O)F	21	−84	62	557-99-3
Perfluoro-N-methyloxazolidine	CF_{3}-NCF_{2}OCF_{2}CF_{2}-	21		237	
Bis(trifluoromethyl)cyanoamine	(CF_{3})_{2}NCN	21		178	
Bis(trifluoromethyl)sulfur difluoride	(CF_{3})_{2}SF_{2}	21		198	30341-38-9
Methaneselenol	CH_{3}SeH	21		95	6486-05-1
Perfluoroethyldimethylamine	C_{2}F_{5}(CF_{3})_{2}N	21±1		271	815-28-1
cis-1,2-Dichloro-1,2-difluoroethene	CClF=CClF	21.1	−119.6	133	598-88-9
Trifluoromethyl trifluoromethanesulfonate	CF_{3}SO_{2}OCF_{3}	21.2	−108.2	218	3582-05-6
Nitrogen dioxide	NO_{2}	21.15	−9.3	46	10102-44-0
Difluoroiodomethane	CHF_{2}I	21.5	−122	178	1493-03-4
Trifluoromethylcyclopropane	C_{3}H_{5}CF_{3}	21.6		110	381-74-8
1,1,1-Trifluoroacetone	CF_{3}C(O)CH_{3}	21.9	−78	112	421-50-1
trans-1,2-Dichloro-1,2-difluoroethene	CClF=CClF	22	−93.3	133	27156-03-2
Heptafluoroisopropyl hypochlorite	(CF_{3})_{2}CFOCl	22		220.5	22675-68-9
Perfluoroazoethane	C_{2}F_{5}N=NC_{2}F_{5}	22		266	
1,2,2-Trifluoropropane	CH_{2}FCF_{2}CH_{3}	22		98	811-94-9
Bis(trifluoromethyl)bromamine	(CF_{3})_{2}NBr	22		232	
Perfluorocyclopentane	CF_{2}CF_{2}CF_{2}CF_{2}CF_{2}	22.5	−80	250.04	376-77-2
Bis(trifluoromethyl)tellurium	(CF_{3})_{2}Te	22.5	−123		55642-42-7
1,1,1,3,3-Pentafluorobutane	CF_{3}CH_{3}CF_{2}CH_{3}	22.6	−34.1	149	406-58-6
octafluoro-1,4-dioxane	(-CF_{2}CF_{2}OCF_{2}CF_{2}O-)	22.75±0.25		232	32981-22-9
Cyanic acid	HNCO	23	−86	43	420-05-3
2-Chloropropene	CH_{3}CCl=CH_{2}	23	−137.4	76.5	557-98-2
1,2,2,2-Tetrafluoroethyl difluoromethyl ether	CF_{3}CHFOCHF_{2}	23		168	57041-67-5
1,1,1,2,3-Pentafluoropropane	CF_{3}CHFCH_{2}F	23		134	431-31-2
2,2,3,3,4,4,5-Heptafluoro oxolane	-CF_{2}CF_{2}CF_{2}CHFO-	23		179	
Pentafluoroethyl iminosulfur difluoride	CF_{3}CF_{2}N=SF_{2}	23±1		203	
Methoxyacetylene	CH_{3}OC≡CH	23±0.5		56	6443-91-0
Carbonyl fluoride iodide	COFI	23.4		174	1495-48-3
1,2,2,2-Tetrafluoroethyl difluoromethyl ether	CF_{3}CHFOCHF_{2}	23.4		168	57041-67-5
Propylsilane	CH_{3}CH_{2}CH_{2}SiH_{3}	23.5±		78	13154-66-0
Trichlorofluoromethane	CCl_{3}F	23.77	−110.48	137.5	75-69-4
1-Chloro-1,3,3,3-tetrafluoropropene	CF_{3}CH=CFCl	24		148.5	460-71-9
1,1,2,2-Tetrafluoro-1-nitro-2-nitrosoethane	NO_{2}CF_{2}CF_{2}NO	24.2		176	679-08-3
Germyl methyl ether	GeH_{3}OCH_{3}	24.3		107	5910-93-0
Dibromodifluoromethane	CBr_{2}F_{2}	24.45	−141.5	210	75-61-6
Heptafluoro-N-propyl isocyanate	C_{3}F_{7}NCO	24.5		211	87050-96-2
Trifluoromethyl fluoroacetate	FCH_{2}COOCF_{3}	24.5		146.04	425-24-1
1,1,1,4,4,4-Hexafluorobutane	CF_{3}CH_{2}CH_{2}CF_{3}	24.6		166	407-59-0
Chloroheptafluorocyclobutane	C_{4}ClF_{7}	25	−39.1	216.5	377-41-3
Dimethylphosphine	(CH_{3})_{2}PH	25		62	676-59-5
Ethylphosphine	CH_{3}CH_{2}PH_{2}	25		62	593-68-0
Perfluorocyclopentene	(CF_{2})_{3}(CF)_{2}	25		212	559-40-0
2-Fluorobutane	CH_{3}CHFCH_{2}CH_{3}	25	−121	76	359-01-3

Number of entries: 551

== Known as gas ==
The following list has substances known to be gases, but with an unknown boiling point.

- Fluoroamine
- Trifluoromethyl trifluoroethyl trioxide CF_{3}OOOCF_{2}CF_{3} boils between 10 and 20°
- Bis-trifluoromethyl carbonate boils between −10 and +10° possibly +12, freezing −60°
- Difluoroaminosulfinyl fluoride F_{2}NS(O)F is a gas but decomposes over several hours
- Trifluoromethylsulfinyl chloride CF_{3}S(O)Cl
- Nitrosyl cyanide ?−20° blue-green gas 4343-68-4
- Thiazyl chloride NSCl greenish yellow gas; trimerises.

== Possible ==
This list includes substances that may be gases. However reliable references are not available.

- cis-1-Fluoro-1-propene
- trans-1-Chloropropene ?
- cis-1-Chloropropene ?
- Perfluoro-1,2-butadiene
- Perfluoro-1,2,3-butatriene −5 polymerizes
- Perfluoropent-2-ene
- Perfluoropent-1-ene 29-30°
- Trifluoromethanesulfenylfluoride CF_{3}SF
- N-Sulfinyltrifluoromethaneamine CF_{3}NSO 18°
- (Chlorofluoromethyl)silane 373-67-1 274.37 K (1.22 °C)
- Difluoromethylsilane 420-34-8 237.56 K (−35.59 °C)
- Trifluoromethyl sulfenic trifloromethyl ester
- Pentafluoro(penta-fluorethoxy)sulfur 900001-56-6 15°
- Ethenol 557-75-5 10.5° = vinyl alcohol (tautomerizes)
- 1,1,1,2,2,3,4,4,4-nonafluorobutane 2-10° melt −129°
- trans-2H-Heptafluoro-2-butene
- Pentafluoroethylhypochlorite around −10°
- Trifluoromethyl pentafluoroethyl sulfide 6° 33547-10-3
- 1,1,1-Trifluoro-N-(trifluoromethoxy)methanamine 671-63-6 0.6°
- 1-Chloro-1,1,2,2,3,3-hexafluoropropane 422-55-9 16.7
- 1-Chloro-1,1,2,3,3,3-hexafluoropropane 359-58-0 17.15
- 2-Chloro-1,1,1,2,3,3-hexafluoropropane 51346-64-6 16.7°
- 3-Chloro-1,1,1,2,2,3-hexafluoropropane 422-57-1 16.7°
- Trifluormethyl 1,2,2,2-tetrafluoroethyl ether 2356-62-9 11°
- 2-Chloro-1,1,1,3,3-pentafluoropropane HFC-235da 134251-06-2 8°
- 1,1,2,3,3-Pentafluoropropane 24270-66-4 −3.77
- 2,2,3,3,4,5,5-Heptafluoro oxolane
- (Heptafluoropropyl)carbonimidic difluoride 378-00-7
- Pentafluoroethyl carbonimidic difluoride 428-71-7
- (Trifluoromethyl)carbonimidic difluoride 371-71-1 CF_{3}N=CF_{2}
- Perfluoro[N-methyl-(propylenamine)] 680-23-9
- Perfluoro-N,N-dimethylvinylamine 13821-49-3
- 3,3,4-Trifluoro-2,4-bis-trifluoromethyl-[1,2]oxazetidine 714-52-3
- Bis(trifluoromethyl) 2,2-difluoro-vinylamine 13747-23-4
- Bis(trifluoromethyl) 1,2-difluoro-vinylamine 13747-24-5
- 1,1,2-Trifluoro-3-(trifluoromethyl)cyclopropane 2967-53-5
- Bis(trifluoromethyl) 2-fluoro-vinylamine 25211-47-6
- 2-Fluoro-1,3-butadiene 381-61-3
- Trifluormethylcyclopropane 381-74-8
- cis-1-Fluoro-1-butene 66675-34-1
- trans-1-Fluoro-1-butene 66675-35-2
- 2-Fluoro-1-butene
- 3-Fluoro-1-butene
- trans-1-Fluoro-2-butene
- cis-2-fluoro-2-butene
- trans-2-fluoro-2-butene
- 1-Fluoro-2-methyl-1-propene
- 3-Fluoro-2-methyl-1-propene
- Perfluoro-2-methyl-1,3-butadiene 384-04-3
- 1,1,3,4,4,5,5,5-Octafluoro-1,2-pentadiene 21972-01-0

== Near misses ==
This list includes substances that boil just above standard condition temperatures. Numbers are boiling temperatures in °C.

- 1,1,2,2,3-Pentafluoropropane 25–26 °C
- Dimethoxyborane 25.9 °C
- 1,4-Pentadiene 25.9 °C
- 2-Bromo-1,1,1-trifluoroethane 26 °C
- 1,2-Difluoroethane 26 °C
- Hydrogen cyanide 26 °C
- Trimethylgermane 26.2 °C
- 1,H-Pentafluorocyclobut-1-ene
- 1,H:2,H-hexafluorocyclobutane
- Tetramethylsilane 26.7 °C
- Chlorosyl trifluoride 27 °C
- 2,2-Dichloro-1,1,1-trifluoroethane 27.8 °C
- Perfluoroethyl 2,2,2-trifluoroethyl ether 27.89 °C
- Perfluoroethyl ethyl ether 28 °C
- Perfluorocyclopentadiene C_{5}F_{6} 28 °C
- 2-Butyne 29 °C
- Digermane 29 °C
- Perfluoroisopropyl methyl ether 29 °C
- Trifluoromethanesulfonyl chloride 29–32 °C
- Perfluoropentane 29.2 °C
- Rhenium(VI) fluoride 33.8 °C
- Chlorodimethylsilane 34.7 °C
- Dimethylarsine 36 °C
- Polonium hydride 36.1 °C
- Spiro[2.2]pentane 39 °C
- Ruthenium(VIII) oxide 40 °C
- 1,3-Difluoropropane 40-42 °C
- Nickel carbonyl 42.1 °C
- 1,2-Difluoropropane 43 °C
- Trimethylphosphine 43 °C

== Unstable substances ==
- Gallane liquid decomposes at 0 °C.
- Nitroxyl and diazene are simple nitrogen compounds known to be gases but they are too unstable and short lived to be condensed.
- Methanetellurol CH_{3}TeH 25284-83-7 unstable at room temperature.
- Sulfur pentafluoride isocyanide isomerises to sulfur pentafluoride cyanide.
