= Silylgermane =

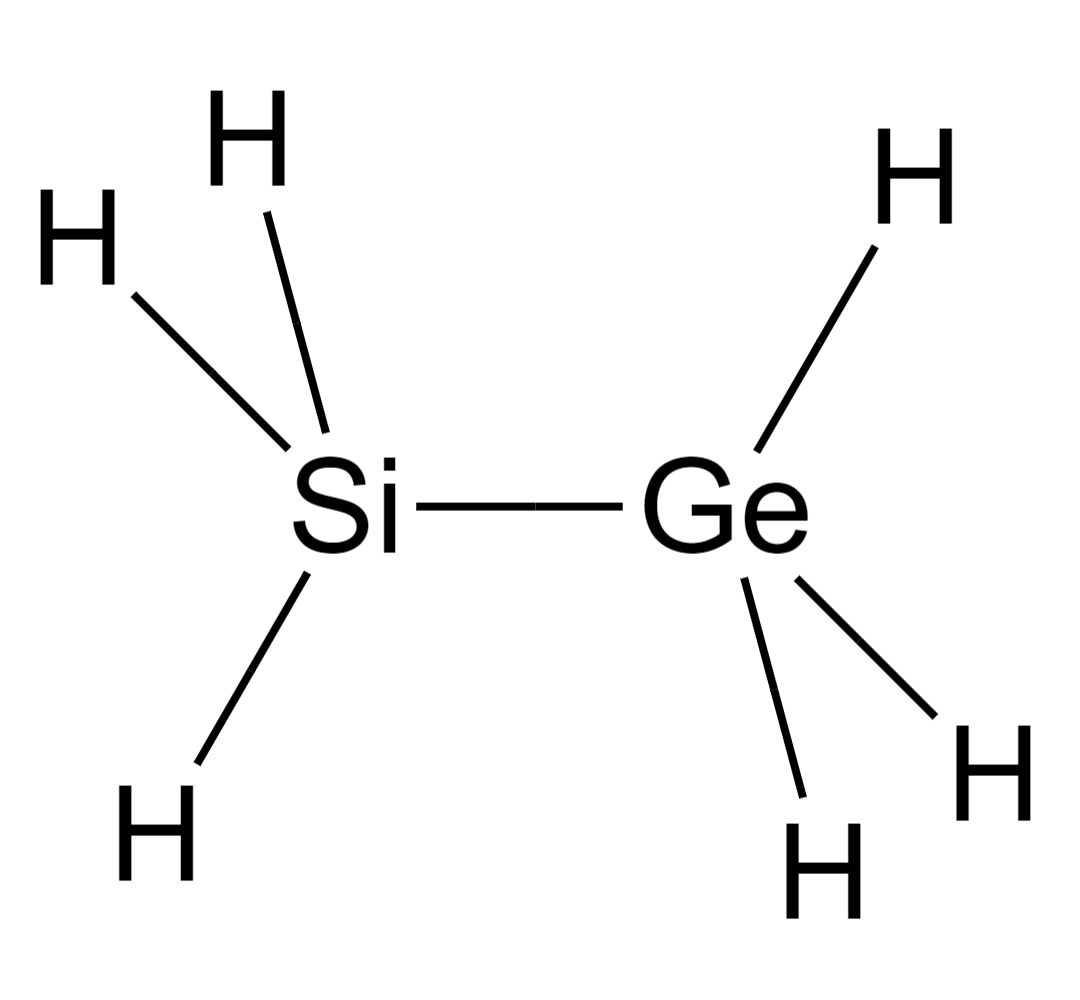

Names
- IUPAC name Silylgermane
- Other names: Germyl - silyl (1:1); Germylsilane

Identifiers
CAS Number	13768-63-3
3D model (JSmol)	Interactive image
ChemSpider	4885751
ECHA InfoCard	100.219.580
EC Number	691-745-6
PubChem CID	6327222
- InChI: InChI=1S/GeH3.H3Si/h2*1H3 Key: CBEQHMYZJXLLJO-UHFFFAOYSA-N
- SMILES: [SiH3][GeH3]

Properties
Chemical formula	SiH_{3}GeH_{3}
Molar mass	106.763 g·mol^{−1}
Appearance	Colorless gas
Odor	Unpleasant, irritating
Melting point	−119.7 °C (−183.5 °F; 153.5 K)
Boiling point	7.0 °C (44.6 °F; 280.1 K)

Structure
Molecular shape	Ethane-like

Hazards
- Occupational safety and health (OHS/OSH)
Main hazards	Extremely flammable, toxic and corrosive, may cause severe and permanent eye damage, fatal if inhaled
Inhalation hazards	Fatal
Eye hazards	Permanent eye damage
Skin hazards	Corrosive injuries
- GHS labelling
Pictograms	(GHS02: Flammable) (GHS05: Corrosive) (GHS06: Toxic)
Signal word	Danger
Hazard statements	H220, H314, H330
Precautionary statements	P210, P222, P230, P260, P264, P271, P280, P284, P301+P330+P331, P302, P304+P340, P305, P316, P320, P321, P338, P361, P363, P377, P381, P403, P403+P233, P405, P410+P403, P501

Related compounds
Related compounds	Ethane; Disilane; Digermane; Methylsilane; Methylgermane
- Except where otherwise noted, data are given for materials in their standard state (at 25 °C [77 °F], 100 kPa). Infobox references

Silylgermane is an inorganic compound with the chemical formula SiH_{3}GeH_{3}. It is a colorless gas with an unpleasant odor. It is unstable in air. It is very flammable, very toxic and corrosive. It reacts with alkali liberating hydrogen.

== History ==
Silylgermane was prepared in 1962 by Alan MacDiarmid and his coworkers by a silent electric discharge through an equimolar mix of silane and germane gases for a total of 28 hours. This method produces other hydrides of silicon and germanium as well.

== Preparation ==
One of the most common methods of preparation of silylgermane is the reaction of germane (GeH_{4}) and chlorosilane (SiH_{3}Cl) in the presence of a catalyst. Another method is the reaction of germane and silicon tetrachloride in the presence of a reducing agent. Silylgermane can also be produced by the reaction between hydrochloric acid and magnesium or calcium germanides-silicides, and by the reaction between hydrofluoric acid and a mixture of silicon monoxide and germanium monoxide. The synthesis of silylgermane requires careful handling due to its extreme toxicity and flammability.

== Structure ==
The structure of silylgermane's molecule is H_{3}Si−GeH_{3}, in other words, silyl and germyl groups are connected together by a single bond. Silylgermane molecule contains both silicon and germanium atoms. The molecule of silylgermane can be viewed as a silyl group replacing one of the hydrogen atoms of the germane molecule. According to the VSEPR theory, the molecule structure is like ethane, with a tetrahedral molecular geometry on silicon and germanium atoms. Silylgermane is a group 14 hydride.

== Uses ==
Silylgermane is useful in scientific research applications, for example in research of the properties of silicon and germanium compounds. Silylgermane is used as a precursor for the synthesis of germanium compounds, as well as in electronics such as germanium quantum dots, germanium nanowires, and in the production of solar cells and semiconductors.

== Safety ==
Silylgermane is extremely flammable and may explode, especially upon heating closed bottles containing this chemical. Silylgermane is known to be very toxic, thus, it is important to handle this chemical with cautiousness and to use appropriate protective equipment. It irritates skin, eyes and respiratory system. It is corrosive both to materials and living tissues (e.g. skin, mucous membrane, lungs and eyes). May cause severe and permanent skin and eye damage. Inhalation of silylgermane and its fumes may cause death.

== Derivatives ==
Derivatives of the general formula X_{3}Si−GeX_{3} (X = hydrogen, halogen, alkyl, aryl, and mixtures of these groups) are called silylgermanes as well.

Organic silylgermanes R_{3}Si−GeR'_{3} can be prepared by the reaction between silylpotassium R_{3}SiK and chlorogermane R'_{3}GeCl, or by the reaction between germylpotassium R'_{3}GeK and chlorosilane R_{3}SiCl.

R_{3}SiK + R'_{3}GeCl → R_{3}SiGeR'_{3} + KCl
R'_{3}GeK + R_{3}SiCl → R_{3}SiGeR'_{3} + KCl

The way to obtain fully alkylated silylgermanes is reaction between trialkylsilyl halide R_{3}SiX, trialkylgermyl halide R'_{3}GeX and the sodium metal (typically, the R and R' groups are ethyl and the X is bromine Br).

R_{3}SiX + R'_{3}GeX + 2 Na → R_{3}SiGeR'_{3} + 2 NaX
