= Dehydrohalogenation =

Chemical reaction which removes a hydrogen halide from a substrate

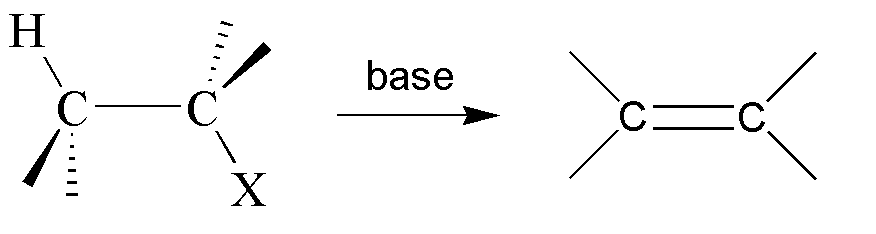
Dehydrohalogenation to give an alkene

In chemistry, dehydrohalogenation is an elimination reaction which removes a hydrogen halide from a substrate. The reaction is usually associated with the synthesis of alkenes, but it has wider applications.

== Dehydrohalogenation from alkyl halides ==
Traditionally, alkyl halides are substrates for dehydrohalogenations. The alkyl halide must be able to form an alkene, thus halides having no C–H bond on an adjacent carbon are not suitable substrates. Aryl halides are also unsuitable. Upon treatment with strong base, chlorobenzene dehydrohalogenates to give phenol via a benzyne intermediate.

=== Base-promoted reactions to alkenes ===
When treated with a strong base many alkyl chlorides convert to corresponding alkene. It is also called a β-elimination reaction and is a type of elimination reaction. Some prototypes are shown below:

$$\begin{align}
\ce{\underset{Ethyl Chloride}{^{\beta}CH3-^{\alpha}CH2Cl} + KOH}\ &\ce{-> \underset{Ethylene}{CH2=CH2} + {KCl} + H2O} \\
\ce{\underset{1-Chloropropane}{CH3-CH2-CH2Cl} + KOH}\ &\ce{ -> \underset{Propene}{CH3-CH=CH2} + {KCl} + H2O} \\
\ce{\underset{2-Chloropropane}{CH3-CHCl-CH3} + KOH}\ &\ce{ -> \underset{Propene}{CH3-CH=CH2} + {KCl} + H2O}
\end{align}$$

Here ethyl chloride reacts with potassium hydroxide, typically in a solvent such as ethanol, giving ethylene. Likewise, 1-chloropropane and 2-chloropropane give propene.

Zaitsev's rule helps to predict regioselectivity for this reaction type.

In general, the reaction of a haloalkane with potassium hydroxide can compete with an S_{N}2 nucleophilic substitution reaction by OH^{−} a strong, unhindered nucleophile. Alcohols are however generally minor products. Dehydrohalogenations often employ strong bases such as potassium tert-butoxide (K^{+} [CH_{3}]_{3}CO^{−}).

=== Base-promoted reactions to alkynes ===
Upon treatment with strong base, vicinal dihalides convert to alkynes.

=== Thermal cracking ===
On an industrial scale, base-promoted dehydrohalogenations as described above are disfavored. The disposal of the alkali halide salt is problematic. Instead thermally-induced dehydrohalogenations are preferred. One example is provided by the production of vinyl chloride by heating 1,2-dichloroethane:

CH_{2}Cl-CH_{2}Cl → CH_{2}=CHCl + HCl

The resulting HCl can be reused in oxychlorination reaction.

Thermally induced dehydrofluorinations are employed in the production of fluoroolefins and hydrofluoroolefins. One example is the preparation of 1,2,3,3,3-pentafluoropropene from 1,1,2,3,3,3-hexafluoropropane:

CF_{2}HCH(F)CF_{3} → CHF=C(F)CF_{3} + HF

== Other dehydrohalogenations ==
=== Epoxides ===
Chlorohydrins, compounds with the connectivity R(HO)CH-CH(Cl)R', undergo dehydrochlorination to give epoxides. This reaction is employed industrially to produce millions of tons of propylene oxide annually from propylene chlorohydrin:

CH_{3}CH(OH)CH_{2}Cl + KOH → CH_{3}CH(O)CH_{2} + H_{2}O + KCl

=== Isocyanides ===
The carbylamine reaction for the synthesis of isocyanides from the action of chloroform on a primary amine involves three dehydrohalogenations. The first dehydrohalogenation is the formation of dichlorocarbene:

KOH + CHCl_{3} → KCl + H_{2}O + CCl_{2}

Two successive base-mediated dehydrochlorination steps result in formation of the isocyanide.

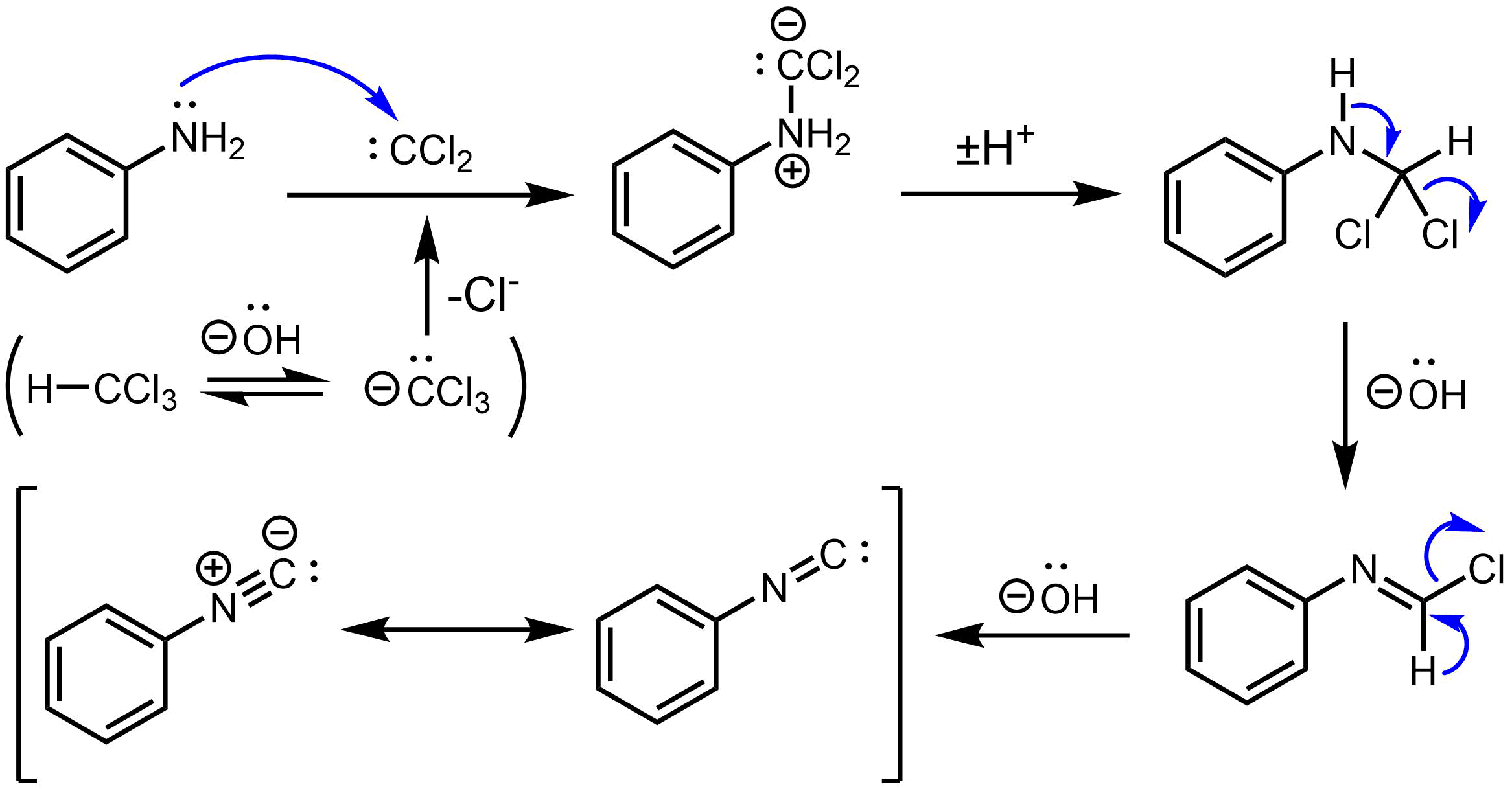

=== Coordination compounds ===
Dehydrohalogenation is not limited to organic chemistry. Some metal-organic coordination compounds can eliminate hydrogen halides, either spontaneously, thermally, or by mechanochemical reaction with a solid base such as potassium hydroxide.

For example, salts that contain acidic cations hydrogen bonded to halometallate anions will often undergo dehydrohalogenation reactions reversibly:

[B–H]^{+}···[X–ML_{n}]^{−} ⇌ [B–ML_{n}] + HX

where B is a basic ligand such as a pyridine, X is a halogen (typically chlorine or bromine), M is a metal such as cobalt, copper, zinc, palladium or platinum, and L_{n} are spectator ligands.
