= Germyl =

Names
- IUPAC name Germanide
- Other names Trihydridogermanate(1-); Trihydridogermanate(IV); Trihydrogen germanide Trihydrogermanide; Trihydridogermyl

Identifiers
CAS Number	radical: 13765-45-2
3D model (JSmol)	anion: Interactive image; radical: Interactive image
ChEBI	anion: CHEBI:30552
ChemSpider	anion: 21865063; radical: 4573980
Gmelin Reference	305156
- InChI: anion: InChI=1S/GeH3/h1H3/q-1 Key: SCCCLDWUZODEKG-UHFFFAOYSA-N; radical: InChI=1S/GeH3/h1H3 Key: WHYHZFHCWGGCOP-UHFFFAOYSA-N
- SMILES: anion: [GeH3-]; radical: [GeH3]

Properties
Chemical formula	GeH^{−}_{3}
Molar mass	75.654 g·mol^{−1}

Related compounds
Other cations	Silanide (-SiH_{3}); Stannyl (-SnH_{3})
- Except where otherwise noted, data are given for materials in their standard state (at 25 °C [77 °F], 100 kPa). Infobox references

Germyl, trihydridogermanate(1-), trihydrogermanide, trihydridogermyl or according to IUPAC Red Book: germanide is an anion containing germanium bounded with three hydrogens, with formula GeH^{−}_{3}. Germyl is the IUPAC term for the –GeH_{3} group. For less electropositive elements the bond can be considered covalent rather than ionic as "germanide" indicates. Germanide is the base for germane when it loses a proton.

GeH_{4} → GeH^{−}_{3} + H^{+}

The first germyl compound to be discovered was sodium germyl. Germane was reacted with sodium dissolved in liquid ammonia to produce sodium germyl. Other alkali metal germyl compounds are known. There are also numerous transition metal complexes that contain germyl as a ligand.

== Formation ==
Alkali metal germyl compounds have been made by reacting germane with the alkali metal dissolved in liquid ammonia, or other non-reactive solvent.

Transition metal complexes cam be made by using lithium aluminium hydride to reduce a trichlorogermyl complex (−GeCl_{3}), which in turn can be made from the transition metal complex chloride and GeCl_{2}.

Salt elimination can be used in a reaction with monochlorogermane and a sodium salt of a transition metal anion:

GeClH_{3} + NaMn(CO)_{5} → NaCl + Mn(GeH_{3})(CO)_{5}.

In the gas phase, the germyl anion GeH^{−}_{3} can be made from germane by capturing an electron with more than 8 eV of energy:

GeH_{4} + e^{−} → GeH^{−}_{3} + H^{•}

The germyl radical can be produced and immobilised in molecular form by exposing germane to vacuum ultraviolet light in a solid argon matrix. On heating, digermane is formed:

2 GeH_{3}^{•} → GeH_{3}GeH_{3}

== Properties ==
Germyl compounds react with water, so water cannot be used as a solvent. Liquids that have been used as solvents include liquid ammonia, ethyl amine, diglyme, or hexamethylphosphoramide. The choice of solvent depends on the temperature desired, whether alkali metals are going to be dissolved, whether the solvent needs to be distilled, and also if it reacts with the solute.

The bond between the metal ion and the germyl ion may be purely ionic, but may also be bonded via two bridging hydrogen atoms.

The energy to rip a hydrogen atom off germane to make the neutral radical is 82.0 ± 2 kcal/mol (343.1 ± 8.4 kJ/mol). GeH_{4} → GeH_{3}^{•} + H^{•}. Electron affinity for the radical is 1.6 eV: GeH_{3}^{•} + e^{−} → GeH_{3}^{−}.

Gas phase acidity of germane is ΔG^{°}_{acid} is 350.8 ± 1.3 kcal/mol (1,467.7 ± 5.4 kJ/mol); ΔH^{°}_{acid} is 358.9 kcal/mol (1,502 kJ/mol) for GeH_{4} → GeH^{−}_{3} + H^{+}.

Both the anion GeH^{−}_{3} and radical GeH^{•}_{3} have C_{3v} symmetry, and are shaped as a triangular pyramid with germanium at the top, and three hydrogen atoms at the bottom. In the radical, the H-Ge-H angle is 110°. In the anion the H-Ge-H angle is about 93°.

== Reactions ==
Germyl compounds gradually decompose at room temperature by releasing hydrogen and forming a metal germide.

Germyl compounds react with alkyl halides to substitute the germyl −GeH_{3} group for the halogen. With aromatic halide compounds, dihalomethanes, or neopentyl haldes they replace the halogen with hydrogen. Organogermanium compounds that can be produced include methyl germane, dimethyl germane, digermyl methane, digermyl ethane, digermyl propane.

The germyl ion reacts with water to yield germane:

GeH^{−}_{3} + H_{2}O → GeH_{4} + OH^{−}

Sodium germyl reacts with oxygen to form an orthogermanate:

NaGeH_{3} + O_{2} → NaOGe(OH)_{3}

This loses water at room temperature.

K[η^{5}-C_{5}H_{5})Mn(CO)_{2}GeH_{3}] reacts with acid to yield [η^{5}-C_{5}H_{5})Mn(CO)_{2}]_{2}Ge which has a Mn=Ge=Mn linkage in it.

== List ==
formula	name	mw	system	space group	unit cell	volume	density	comments	ref
LiGeH_{3}									
LiGeH_{3}•2NH_{3}									
NaGeH_{3}	Sodium Trihydrogermanide							white	
NaGeH_{3}•2NH_{3}									
NaGeH_{3}•4.5NH_{3}									
NaGeH_{3}•6NH_{3}									
P(GeH_{3})_{3}									
KGeH_{3}			cubic		a=7.235		2.003	NaCl structure	
K([18]crown-6)(thf)GeH_{3}		451.13	monoclinic	Pc	a=13.8587 b=9.9670 c=16.9439 β=107.206 Z=4	2235.7	1.34	colourless	
K([15]crown-5)_{2}GeH_{3}		555.23	tetrahedral	I4̅	a=12.685 c=16.985 Z=4	2733.0	1.349	colourless	
K([12]crown-4)_{2}GeH_{3}		467.13	monoclinic	C2/c	a=40.7694 b=6.623 c=29.6746 β=97.450 Z=16	9144.9	1.357	colourless	
K[V(CO)_{3}(η^{5}-C_{5}H_{5})GeH_{3}]									
[PPh_{4}][V(CO)_{3}(η^{5}-C_{5}H_{5})GeH_{3}]			orthorhombic	Pcab	a=17.47 b=15.68 c=21.49 Z=8	5886	1.39	yellow	
K[Cr(CO)_{5}GeH_{3}]									
[PPh_{4}][Cr(CO)_{5}GeH_{3}]			monoclinic	C2/c	a=22.301 b=6.989 c=18.002 β=? Z=4	2788.5	1.45	yellow	
Mn(GeH_{3})(CO)_{5}									
Mn(GeH_{3})(CO)_{2}(PPh(OEt)_{2})_{3}								pale yellow	
Mn(GeH_{3})(CO)_{3}(PPh(OEt)_{2})_{2}		610.96	triclinic	P1̅	a=10.118 b=11.060 c=13.009 α=97.859 β=98.612 γ=92.856 Z=2	1422.3	1.427	pale yellow	
Mn(GeH_{3})(CO)_{2}(P(OEt)_{3})_{3}								pale yellow	
Mn(GeH_{3})(CO)_{3}(P(OEt)_{3})_{2}								pale yellow	
K[η^{5}-C_{5}H_{5})Mn(CO)_{2}GeH_{3}]									
[(CH_{3})_{4}N][η-CH_{3}C_{5}H_{4}Mn(CO)_{2}GeH_{3}]			triclinic	P1̅	a=6.948 b=9.658 c=11.784 α=89.57 β=77.37 γ=88.05 Z=2	772	1.45		
[(CH_{3})_{4}N][η-CH_{3}C_{5}H_{4}Mn(CO)_{2}GeH_{3}]			triclinic	P1̅	a=6.958 b=9.658 c=11.784 α=89.57 β=77.37 γ=88.05 Z=2	772	1.46		
(GeH_{3})_{2}Fe(CO)_{4}	digermyltetracarbonyliron							mp 71 °C colourless	
GeH_{3}(H)Fe(CO)_{4}	monogermylhydridotetracarbonyliron							mp −30 °C colourless	
GeH_{3}Fe(C_{5}H_{5})(CO)_{2}	Germyl(cyclopentadienyl)dicarbonyliron							mp 81 °C yellow	
Fe(CO)_{4}(GeH_{2}GeH_{3})(GeH_{3})									
Fe(CO)_{4}(GeH_{3})(GeMe_{3})									
{Fe(CO)_{4}(GeH_{2})}_{2}								-Fe-Ge-Fe-Ge- ring	
K[Co_{2}(CO)_{7}GeH_{3}]									
[PPh_{4}]Co_{2}(CO)_{7}GeH_{3}]									
K[Co-(CO)(η^{5}C_{6}H_{5})GeH_{3}]									
[PPh_{4}][Co-(CO)(η^{5}C_{6}H_{5})GeH_{3}]									
K[Co-(CO)(η^{5}C_{6}(CH_{3})_{5})GeH_{3}]									
[PPh_{4}][Co-(CO)(η^{5}C_{6}(CH_{3})_{5})GeH_{3}]									
K[(η^{5}-C_{5}H_{5})-Mn(CO)_{2}GeH_{3}]									
K[Ni(CO)_{3}GeH_{3}]									
[PPh_{4}][Ni(CO)_{3}GeH_{3}]			monoclinic	C2	a=16.855 b=7.098 c=15.189 β=134.71 Z=2	1291.5	1.43	orange yellow	
K[Ni(CO)_{2}(PPh_{3})GeH_{3}]									
[PPh_{4}][Ni(CO)_{2}(PPh_{3})GeH_{3}]			monoclinic	P2_{1}/n	a=10.37 b=22.37 c=16.95 β=96.23 Z=4	2910.6	1.74	orange yellow	
As(GeH_{3})_{3}									
Rb([18]crown-6)(thf)GeH_{3}		497.50	monoclinic	Cc	a=13.8336 b=9.9878 c=16.9893 β=107.417 Z=4	2239.7	1.475	colourless	
RbGeH_{3}					a=7.518		2.518		
K[Nb(CO)_{3}(η^{5}-C_{5}H_{5})GeH_{3}]									
[PPh_{4}][Nb(CO)_{3}(η^{5}-C_{5}H_{5})GeH_{3}]									
K[Mo(CO)_{5}GeH_{3}]									
[PPh_{4}][Mo(CO)_{5}GeH_{3}]			monoclinic	C2/c	a=22.25 b=7.021 c=18.545 β=96.14 Z=4	2881	1.5	yellow	
Ru(GeH_{3})(η^{5}-C_{5}H_{5})(PPh_{3})P(OMe)_{3}		628.12	monoclinic	P2_{1}/c	a=17.932 b=10.067 c=16.375, β=114.508° Z=4	2689.6	1.551	yellow	
Ru(GeH_{3})(η^{5}-C_{5}H_{5})(PPh_{3})P(OEt)_{3}								yellow	
Ru(GeH_{3})(η^{5}-C_{5}H_{5})(PPh_{3})PPh(OEt)_{2}								yellow	
Ru(GeH_{3})(η^{5}-C_{9}H_{7})(PPh_{3})P(OMe)_{3}								yellow	
Ru(GeH_{3})(η^{5}-C_{9}H_{7})(PPh_{3})P(OEt)_{3}								yellow	
Ru(GeH_{3})(η^{5}-C_{9}H_{7})(PPh_{3})PPh(OEt)_{2}								yellow	
Ru(GeH_{3})(Tp)(PPh_{3}))P(OEt)_{3}								yellow	
Ru(GeH_{3})(Tp)(PPh_{3})PPh(OEt)_{2}								yellow	
cis-[Ru(dppe)_{2}(GeH_{3})H]•C_{6}H_{6}		1014.4	triclinic	P1̅	a 12.3464 b 13.2412 c 16.2053, α 90.055° β 98.868° γ 116.164° Z=2	2342.3	1.438		
trans-[Ru(dppe)_{2}(GeH_{3})H]									
cis-[Ru(depe)_{2}(GeH_{3})H]									
trans-[Ru(depe)_{2}(GeH_{3})H]									
cis-[Ru(dmpe)_{2}(GeH_{3})H]									
trans-[Ru(dmpe)_{2}(GeH_{3})H]									
cis-[Ru(DuPhos)_{2}(GeH_{3})H]		790.38	orthorhombic	P2_{1}2_{1}2_{1}	a 10.1222 b 18.4327 c 19.425 Z=4	3624.4	1.448		
Ru(GeH_{3})(Cp′)L Cp′=η^{5}-C_{5}Me_{5} L=1,2-[bis(diphenyl) phosphanyloxy]-1,2-diphenylethane									
Ru(GeH_{3})(Cp′)L Cp′=η^{5}-C_{9}H_{7} L=1,2-[bis(diphenyl) phosphanyloxy]-1,2-diphenylethane									
Sb(GeH_{3})_{3}	trigermylstibine								
Cs([18]crown-6)_{2}GeH_{3}		734.12	tetrahedral	P4/n	a=13.2513 c=19.0577 Z=4	3346.5	1.457	colourless	
CsGeH_{3}			orthorhombic		a=5.1675 b=14.435 c=5.9664		3.111		
K[W(CO)_{5}GeH_{3}]									
[PPh_{4}][W(CO)_{5}GeH_{3}]			monoclinic	C2/c	a=22.227 b=7.025 c=18.529 β=96.11 Z=4	2883.2	1.71	yellow	
GeH_{3}Re(CO)_{5}	Germylpentacarbonylrhenium							colourless mp 53-54 °C	
GeH_{2}[Re(CO)_{5}]_{2}	bis(pentacarbonylrhenium)germane								
Re(GeH_{3})(CO)_{2}(PPh(OEt)_{2})_{3}								white	
Re(GeH_{3})(CO)_{3}(PPh(OEt)_{2})_{2}								white	
Re(GeH_{3})(CO)_{2}(P(OEt)_{3})_{3}								white	
Re(GeH_{3})(CO)_{3}(P(OEt)_{3})_{2}								white	
K[Re(CO)_{2}(η^{5}-C_{5}H_{5})GeH_{3}]									
[PPh_{4}][Re(CO)_{2}(η^{5}-C_{5}H_{5})GeH_{3}]									
Os(GeH_{3})(Tp)(PPh_{3})P(OMe)_{3} Tp = tris(pyrazolyl)borate								white	

== Related ==
Germylidyne with formula ≡GeH has a triple bond to the metal atom.

Germylidene with base formula =GeH_{2} has a double bond to the central metal.
