= Chlorotrifluorosilane =

Names
- Preferred IUPAC name Chlorotri(fluoro)silane
- Other names silicon chlorotrifluoride

Identifiers
CAS Number	14049-36-6
3D model (JSmol)	Interactive image
ChemSpider	123179
PubChem CID	139671
CompTox Dashboard (EPA)	DTXSID90161412
- InChI: InChI=1S/ClF3Si/c1-5(2,3)4 Key: WOLDFAYTXKMDAQ-UHFFFAOYSA-N
- SMILES: F[Si](F)(F)Cl

Properties
Chemical formula	ClF_{3}Si
Molar mass	120.53371
Appearance	colorless gas
Density	1.31 g/mL
Melting point	−138 °C (−216 °F; 135 K)
Boiling point	critical point 303.7 K at 3.46 MPa
Solubility in water	reacts
Vapor pressure	16600
Refractive index (n_{D})	1.279

Structure
Molecular shape	distorted tetrahedron
Dipole moment	0.636 D(gas)

Related compounds
Related compounds	tetrafluorosilane dichlorodifluorosilane
- Except where otherwise noted, data are given for materials in their standard state (at 25 °C [77 °F], 100 kPa). (what is ?) Infobox references

Chlorotrifluorosilane is an inorganic gaseous compound with formula SiClF_{3} composed of silicon, fluorine and chlorine. It is a silane that substitutes hydrogen with fluorine and chlorine atoms.

== Production ==
By heating a mixture of anhydrous aluminium chloride and sodium hexafluorosilicate to between 190 and 250 °C a mixture of gases containing chlorotrifluorosilane is given off. These are condensed at -196 °C degrees and fractionally distilled at temperatures up to -78 °C.

SiClF_{3} can be made by reacting silicon tetrachloride and silicon tetrafluoride gases at 600 °C, producing a mixture of fluorochlorosilanes including about one quarter SiClF_{3}.

SiClF_{3} can be made by reacting silicon tetrachloride with antimony trifluoride. An antimony pentachloride catalyst assists. The products are distilled to separate it out from tetrafluorosilane and dichlorodifluorosilane.

At high temperatures above 500 °C silicon tetrafluoride can react with phosphorus trichloride to yield some SiClF_{3}. This is unusual because SiF_{4} is very stable.

Silicon tetrachloride can react with trifluoro(trichloromethyl)silane to yield SiClF_{3} and CCl_{3}SiCl_{3}.

2-Chloroethyltrifluorosilane or 1,2-dichloroethyltrifluorosilane can be disassociated by an infrared laser to yield SiClF_{3} and C_{2}H_{4} (ethylene) or vinyl chloride. By tuning the laser to a vibration frequency of a particular isotope of silicon, different isotopomers can be selectively broken up in order to have a product that only concentrates one isotope of silicon. So silicon-30 can be increased to 80% by using the 934.5 cm^{−1} line in a CO_{2} laser.

The first published preparation of SiClF_{3} by Schumb and Gamble was by exploding hexafluorodisilane in chlorine: Si_{2}F_{6} + Cl_{2} → 2SiClF_{3}. Other products of this explosion may include amorphous silicon, SiCl_{2}F_{2} and SiF_{4}.

Chlorine reacts with silicon tetrafluoride in the presence of aluminium chips at 500-600 °C to make mostly silicon tetra chloride and some SiClF_{3}.

Mercuric chloride when heated with SiF_{3}Co(CO)_{4} breaks the bond to form a 90% yield of SiClF_{3}.

The combination of SiF_{4} and chlorodimethylphosphine yields some SiClF_{3}.

Trifluorosilane SiHF_{3} reacts with gaseous chlorine to yield SiClF_{3} and HCl.

== Properties ==
=== Molecular size and angles ===
Bond length for Si–Cl is 1.996 Å and for Si–F is 1.558 Å. The bond angle ∠FSiCl = 110.2° and ∠FSiF = 108.7°. The bond length between silicon and chlorine is unusually short, indicating a 31% double bond. This can be explained by the more ionic fluoride bonds withdrawing some charge allowing a partial positive charge on the chlorine.

The molecular dipole moment is 0.636 Debye.

=== Bulk properties ===
Between 129.18 and 308.83 K the vapour pressure in mm Hg at temperature T in K is given by log_{10} P = 102.6712 -2541.6/T -43.347 log_{10} T + 0.071921T -0.000045231 T^{2}.

The heat of formation of chlorotrifluorosilane is -315.0 kcal/mol at 298K.

== Reactions ==
Chlorotrifluorosilane is hydrolysed by water to produce silica.

Chlorotrifluorosilane reacts with trimethylstannane ((CH_{3})_{3}SnH) at room temperature to make trifluorosilane in about 60 hours.

== Use ==
Proposed uses include a dielectric gas with a high breakdown voltage, and low global warming potential, a precursor for making fluorinated silica soot, and a vapour deposition gas.

== Related substances ==
Chlorotrifluorosilane can form an addition compound with pyridine with formula SiClF_{3}.2py (py=pyridine) An addition compound with trimethylamine exists. This addition compound is made by mixing trimethylamine vapour with Chlorotrifluorosilane and condensing out a solid at -78 °C. If this was allowed to soak in trimethylamine liquid for over eight hours, a diamine complex formed (2Me_{3}N·SiClF_{3}). At 0° the disassociation pressure of the monoamine complex was 23 mm Hg.

SiClF_{3}^{−} is a trigonal bipyramidal shape with a Cl and F atom on the axis. It is formed when gamma rays hit the neutral molecule.

Chlorotetrafluorosilicate (IV) (SiClF_{4}^{−}) can form a stable a pale yellow crystalline compound tetraethylammonium chlorotetrafluorosilicate.

== Extra reading ==
- Wodarczyk, F.J; Wilson, E.B (March 1971). "Radio frequency-microwave double resonance as a tool in the analysis of microwave spectra". Journal of Molecular Spectroscopy. 37 (3): 445–463. Bibcode:1971JMoSp..37..445W. doi:10.1016/0022-2852(71)90176-7.
- Sheridan, John; Gordy, Walter (March 1950). "Microwave Spectra and Molecular Constants of Trifluorosilane Derivatives. SiF3H, SiF3CH3, SiF3Cl, and SiF3Br". Physical Review. 77 (5): 719. Bibcode:1950PhRv...77..719S. doi:10.1103/PhysRev.77.719.
- Sheridan, John; Gordy, Walter (1951). "The Microwave Spectra and Molecular Structures of Trifluorosilane Derivatives". The Journal of Chemical Physics. 19 (7): 965. Bibcode:1951JChPh..19..965S. doi:10.1063/1.1748418.
- Ault, Bruce S. (December 1979). "Infrared matrix isolation studies of the M+SiF5- ion pair and its chlorine-fluorine analogs". Inorganic Chemistry. 18 (12): 3339–3343. doi:10.1021/ic50202a012.
- Stanton, C. T.; McKenzie, S. M.; Sardella, D. J.; Levy, R. G.; Davidovits, Paul (August 1988). "Boron atom reactions with silicon and germanium tetrahalides". The Journal of Physical Chemistry. 92 (16): 4658–4662. doi:10.1021/j100327a020.
