= Methylsilane =

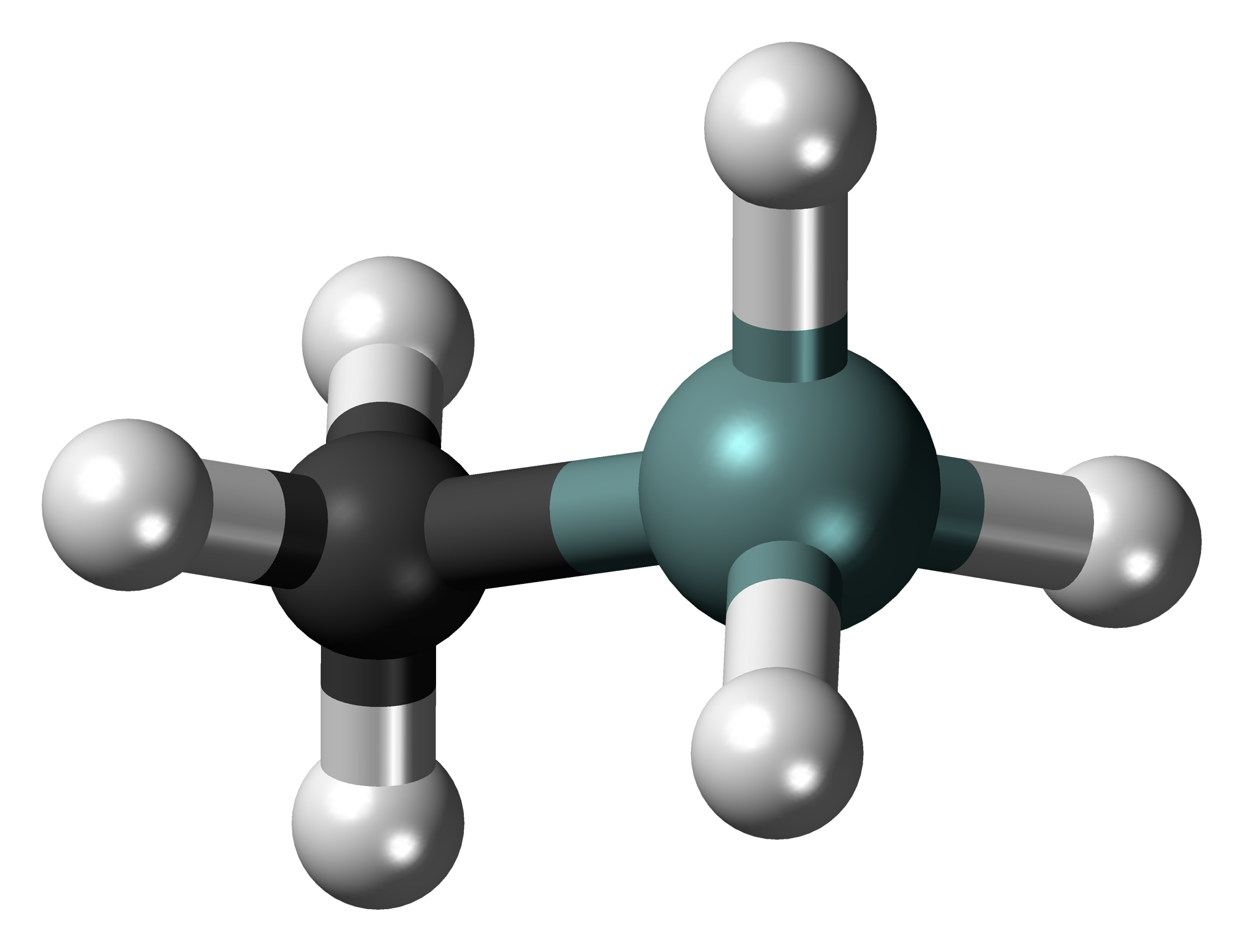

Identifiers
CAS Number	992-94-9
3D model (JSmol)	Interactive image
ChemSpider	63613
ECHA InfoCard	100.012.362
EC Number	213-598-5
PubChem CID	70434
CompTox Dashboard (EPA)	DTXSID40870820
- InChI: InChI=1S/CH6Si/c1-2/h1-2H3 Key: UIUXUFNYAYAMOE-UHFFFAOYSA-N
- SMILES: C[SiH3]

Properties
Chemical formula	CH_{6}Si
Molar mass	46.14 g/mol
Appearance	Colorless gas
Density	0.628 g cm^{−3}
Melting point	−157 °C (−251 °F; 116 K)
Boiling point	−57 °C (−71 °F; 216 K)

Hazards
- GHS labelling
Pictograms	(GHS02: Flammable) (GHS07: Exclamation mark)
Signal word	Danger
Hazard statements	H220, H312, H315, H319, H332, H335, H336
Precautionary statements	P210, P261, P264, P271, P280, P302+P352, P304+P312, P304+P340, P305+P351+P338, P312, P321, P322, P332+P313, P337+P313, P362, P363, P377, P381, P403, P403+P233, P405, P410+P403, P501

Related compounds
Related compounds	Ethane; Disilane; Dimethylsilane; Trimethylsilane; Tetramethylsilane
- Except where otherwise noted, data are given for materials in their standard state (at 25 °C [77 °F], 100 kPa). Infobox references

Methylsilane is the organosilicon compound with the formula CH_{3}SiH_{3}. It is a colorless gas that ignites in air. It can be prepared by reduction of methyltrichlorosilane with lithium aluminium hydride. It has been investigated as a precursor to silicon carbide.

Methylsilane has been the subject of extensive theoretical analysis.
