= Difluorosilane =

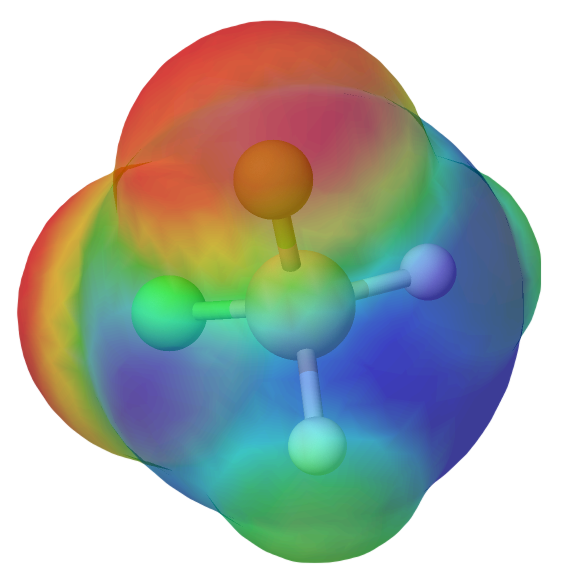

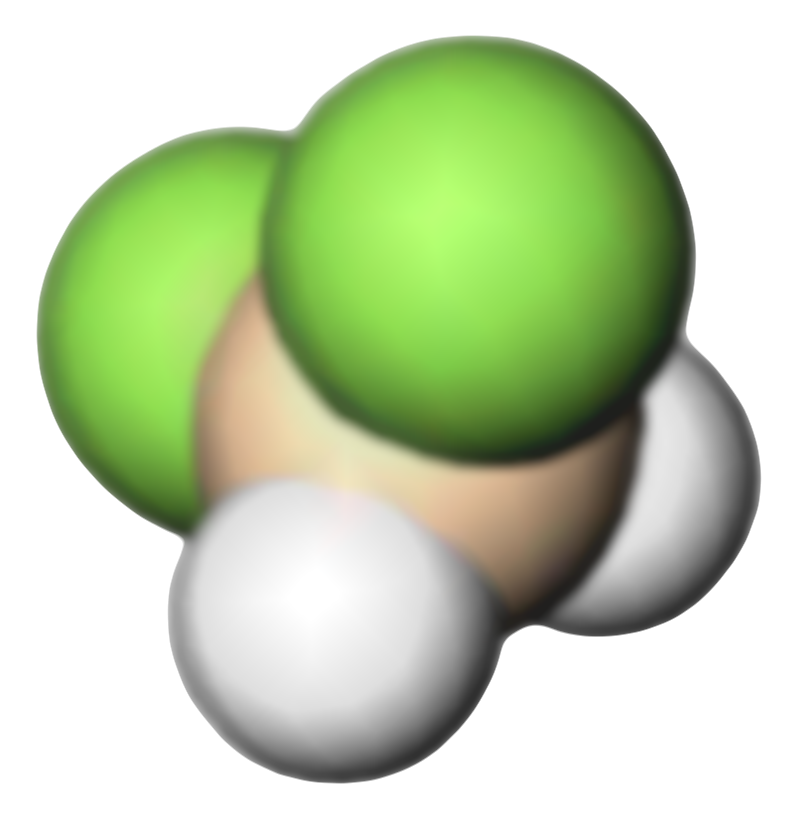

Identifiers
CAS Number	13824-36-7
3D model (JSmol)	Interactive image
ChemSpider	109934
PubChem CID	123331
CompTox Dashboard (EPA)	DTXSID20930037
- InChI: InChI=1S/F2H2Si/c1-3-2/h3H2 Key: PUUOOWSPWTVMDS-UHFFFAOYSA-N
- SMILES: F[SiH2]F

Properties
Chemical formula	F_{2}H_{2}Si
Molar mass	68.098 g·mol^{−1}
Appearance	colourless gas
Melting point	−122 °C (−188 °F; 151 K)
Boiling point	−77.8 °C (−108.0 °F; 195.3 K)

Thermochemistry
Std molar entropy (S^{⦵}_{298})	262.12 J/mol•K
Std enthalpy of formation (Δ_{f}H^{⦵}_{298})	−790.78 kJ/mol
- Except where otherwise noted, data are given for materials in their standard state (at 25 °C [77 °F], 100 kPa). Infobox references

Difluorosilane is a gaseous chemical compound with formula SiH_{2}F_{2}. It can be considered as a derivative of silane with two hydrogen atoms replaced with fluorine.

== Production ==
Difluorosilane can be made by fluorinating dichlorosilane with antimony trifluoride.

3 SiH_{2}Cl_{2} + 2 SbF_{3} → 3 SiH_{2}F_{2} + 2 SbCl_{3}

Some is also made in a reaction of silicon tetrafluoride with hydrogen

SiF_{4} + 2 H_{2} → SiH_{2}F_{2} + 2 HF

Traces of difluorosilane are made when coal is burnt.

== Properties ==
Difluorosilane is a gas with boiling point −77.8 °C, and a freezing point of −122 °C. It has no colour. The silicon–fluorine bond length in difluorosilane is 1.358 Å which is greater than that in fluorosilane but less than the length in trifluorosilane.

== Reactions ==
In an electric discharge, hydrogen atoms are preferentially removed from the molecule and SiHF_{2}SiHF_{2} is formed along with hydrogen.

2 SiH_{2}F_{2} → SiHF_{2}SiHF_{2} + H_{2}

At elevated temperatures, difluorosilane can disproportionate by swapping hydrogen and fluorine atoms between molecules to form fluorosilane and trifluorosilane.

== Use ==
Difluorosilane is used in dental varnish in order to prevent tooth cavities.

Difluorosilane is also used in chemical vapour deposition to deposit silicon nitride films.
