= C4-FN =

New gas and mixture of gases for high voltage switchgear

Names
- IUPAC name 2,3,3,3-Tetrafluoro-2-(trifluoromethyl)propanenitrile
- Other names: Novec 4710; Fluoronitrile; Perfluoroisobutyronitrile

Identifiers
CAS Number	42532-60-5
3D model (JSmol)	Interactive image
ChemSpider	10324108
ECHA InfoCard	100.233.498
EC Number	806-451-7
PubChem CID	12633773
CompTox Dashboard (EPA)	DTXSID90505110
- InChI: InChI=1S/C4F7N/c5-2(1-12,3(6,7)8)4(9,10)11 Key: AASDJASZOZGYMM-UHFFFAOYSA-N
- SMILES: C(#N)C(C(F)(F)F)(C(F)(F)F)F

Properties
Chemical formula	C_{4}F_{7}N
Molar mass	195.040 g·mol^{−1}
Density	8.1459 kg·m^{−3} (1.0 bar at 20 °C)
Boiling point	−5 °C (23 °F; 268 K)
Critical point (T, P)	385.996 K 2501.524 kPa
Vapor pressure	2.5174 bar (at 20 °C)
- Except where otherwise noted, data are given for materials in their standard state (at 25 °C [77 °F], 100 kPa). Infobox references

C4-FN (C4-fluoronitrile, C4FN) is a perfluorinated compound developed as an extremely high-dielectric gas for high-voltage switchgear. It has the structure (CF_{3})_{2}CFC≡N, which can be described as perfluoroisobutyronitrile, falling under the OECD chemical definition of per- and polyfluoroalkyl substances (PFAS).

It is promoted as an alternative to sulfur hexafluoride (SF_{6}) for interruption and insulation applications, as it has insulation properties twice that of SF_{6} and a relatively low global warming potential (GWP) compared to SF_{6}, which is the most potent known greenhouse gas. The compound has been introduced into the market by 3M under the denomination Novec 4710 and commercialized in high voltage equipment by General Electric starting from 2016. It is seen as a credible alternative to SF_{6} by the European Commission as offering the capability to replace SF_{6} while keeping the same benefits of dimensional footprint and performance. Several other companies started using C4-FN mixtures for high voltage applications: LS Electric, Hitachi Energy, Hyosung or Hyundai Electric.

C4-FN mixtures refers to the typically used gas mixtures including C4-FN mixed with natural origin gases (O_{2}, CO_{2}, N_{2}) which are used within high-voltage equipment.

There are no other reported applications than electrical insulation for the C4-FN mixtures. Apart from typical distribution and transmission high-voltage equipment, research has been done for applications within the Large Hadron Collider.

== Application to high-voltage equipment ==
=== Current applications ===
C4-FN is usually not used alone as a single gas compound in high voltage equipment due to its high boiling point temperature which would limit either the pressure or the application temperature to too strict levels which are usually between -30 °C and +55 °C as per the relevant standards. It is mostly used mixed with carbon dioxide (CO_{2}), nitrogen (N_{2}), and oxygen (O_{2}), in proportions widely varying depending on applications and products but ranging from 3.5% to 6% (percentages are given in mole fraction).

C4-FN is usually used as a dielectric additive whose content is a compromise between:

- The filling pressure of the equipment, which is necessary to ensure current interruption by the circuit breaker.
- The required minimum operating temperature of the equipment.
- The other gases used (CO_{2}, O_{2}, N_{2}) and their chemical interactions.

Contrary to the C5-FK (fluoroketone) technology, C4-FN mixtures are able to cover the needs of the network operators. Hitachi Energy announced breaking away from the C5-FK to focus purely on C4-FN and natural origin solutions for high-voltage equipment.

C4-FN technology is recent but developing quickly, especially under the recent public pressure to reduce carbon footprint of the equipment. The use of SF_{6} in the electrical industry is not well known and the status of exception is wearing as shown by the new proposal of European F-Gas regulation.

In comparison with the development of air-blast, SF_{6} and vacuum technologies, C4-FN is relatively fast. This is permitted by the use of similar concepts as for other puffer and selfblast technologies:

- 2014: First publication of the use of C4-FN for high-voltage applications.
- 2016: First GIL using a C4-FN/CO_{2} mixture energized in Sellindge. The equipment is rated 420 kV and operating on a 400 kV network.
- 2017: First GIS using a C4-FN/O_{2}/CO_{2} mixture energized in Etzel, Switzerland. The equipment is rated 145 kV, 40 kA and operating on a 50 kV network.
- 2021: First AIS, live-tank, using C4-FN/O_{2}/CO_{2} mixture energized.
- 2022: Announced date for the availability of a 420 kV, 63 kA GIS.

Higher content of C4-FN has been reported in specific retrofilling applications, i.e., where the gas within commissioned equipment, usually SF_{6}, is replaced by a gas mixture containing C4-FN. Retrofilling designates a sort of retrofitting with limited changes on the equipment.

=== Alternative technologies ===
In the recent years, C4-FN has taken the lead on other gaseous media alternatives like HFO-1234ze and C_{5}F_{10}O (fluoroketone, C5-FK), as several manufacturers started adopting it. The most important rally was the commitment to the technology by Hitachi Energy in April 2021.

C4-FN mixture technology is today in competition with mixtures of natural-origin gases such as nitrogen (N_{2}), oxygen (O_{2}) and carbon dioxide (CO_{2}), which have a GWP below 1 and lower boiling points but lower dielectric and thermal properties which negatively impact the overall performance of the equipment and usually results in bigger apparatuses and use of material. The mixtures using natural-origin gas often are only used for insulation while the interruption function is done using on vacuum interrupters. The scalability of such vacuum interrupters is still subject to discussion and polemic as the announced portfolio and products above 145 kV are still to be released

== Regulations ==
=== F-Gas ===
C4-FN is a fluorinated gas and its use can be locally regulated because of its greenhouse effect. As the molecule was only very recently introduced on the market for high voltage switchgear, it was not yet properly regulated.

The latest proposal of the European F-gas regulation represents a severe drawback for the C4-FN solutions in high voltage equipment as it introduces a hierarchy between three categories of solutions: GWP<10, GWP<2000 and GWP≥2000. The impact of such regulation would be to make the C4-FN products as transition solutions before the apparition of GWP<10 alternatives.

=== Supporters ===
ENTSO-E has officially stated its support to the C4-FN mixtures for high voltage equipment as they represent the best solution to quickly remove SF_{6}. The European Distribution System Operators (E.DSO) association also supported the removal of the GWP<10 threshold in the latest F-gas proposal.

The main reasons mentioned in the positions' papers are that:

- C4-FN mixtures appear the fastest solution to replace SF_{6} in the coming years. Making it a non-viable solution in the medium-term would likely slow or stop all development and result in new substations to be installed with SF_{6}.
- The carbon-footprint of a C4-FN substation is much lower as with other alternative solutions like vacuum or natural-origin gases as per several Life-cycle assessments. Therefore, the rationale of greenhouse gas reduction is achieved by the technology and the regulation's scope should not be limited to the gas only but to the whole product.
- There is only one supplier of vacuum interrupter able to reach 145 kV at the moment: Siemens. Preventing the use of C4-FN gases for high voltage equipment would therefore represent the risk of monopoly in short and medium-term, impacting strongly the competition on the market. Additionally, there is a risk than Siemens could not reach the demand due to the transfer of productions from other manufacturers.

Several European fundings supported the development of C4-FN solutions through the LIFE programme.

=== Criticisms ===
C4-FN is still criticized regarding its reliance on manufacturers' data mostly. Two topics are discussed: Reliability and Environment Health and Safety (EHS).

The reliability was mostly discussed regarding the applicability or not of the existent IEC and IEEE standards to fully qualify C4-FN mixtures performance. This has been partially reduced with CIGRE publishing several technical brochures from working groups that investigated the phenomena, reliability and testing procedures for C4-FN mixtures. In the meantime, IEC and IEEE organizations started working on new or revised standards. ETH Zurich also contributed to investigate key properties of the gas and its mixtures.

Regarding the EHS aspects, the main discussed aspect is the toxicology of C4-FN which was almost exclusively studied by the producer (3M) and OEM (GE Grid, Hitachi Energy, etc.). The molecule is now registered in REACH with the CAS no. 42532-60-05. It should not be confounded with its isomer, heptafluorobutyronitrile, which is toxic (CAS no. 375-00-8). It is certain that the study of pure, mixed, and arced C4-FN should continue to consolidate the knowledge about the risks. Several parties have started, mainly research teams.

Siemens Energy regularly criticized the C4-FN technology which is in direct competition with its vacuum and synthetic air technology.

== Physical and other properties ==
=== Impact on the environment ===
C4-FN is a greenhouse gas and has a Global Warming Potential (GWP) estimated at 2750 over 100 years, although various studies give other results: 1490, 2100 and 3646. Its atmospheric lifetime is estimated in the range of 30 years. It is therefore much better than SF_{6} whose GWP_{100} is 24300 but also much higher than CO_{2} (GWP 1) or air (GWP 0).

C4-FN mixtures have much lower GWP as pure C4-FN because the amount of the fluorinated gas is relatively low in molar fraction. When mixed with O_{2}, CO_{2}, or N_{2}, in the range of reported applications, the GWP of the complete mixture is usually in the range of GWP_{100} 300-500. Additionally, the GWP is a CO_{2} equivalent per unit of mass and C4-FN mixtures being typically 50% lighter than SF_{6}, the GWP reduction is in the range of 98.7-99.3% compared to SF_{6} at identical volume.

Nevertheless, C4-FN, pure or mixed, is a potent greenhouse gas whose emissions must be carefully minimized. This gas is not foreseen in other applications than high-voltage insulation where it provides advantageous GWP reduction in comparison to SF_{6}.

As a fluorinated gas with greenhouse effect, C4-FN could be targeted by regulations like the European F-Gas regulation through the mention of GWP limits.

=== Thermodynamic and dielectric properties ===
Vapor pressure of pure C4-FN from -50°C up to its critical point, as calculated with the Peng-Robinson equation of state. This property shows that high pressures are not achievable with pure C4-FN. Therefore, C4-FN is mixed with other gases having much lower boiling temperatures.

Pure C4-FN can be described using a Peng-Robinson equation of state. Relatively accurate results have been obtained using the critical point (385.996 K, 2501.524 kPa, 2.6302 mol/L) and an acentric factor of 0.356. Mixtures of C4-FN/O_{2}/CO_{2} have been described in various literature and recently updated by two equipment manufacturers.

The dielectric properties have been investigated in several laboratories under the supervision of ETH Zurich and as part of the CIGRE D1.67 working group.

The measurements show that a C4-FN/CO_{2} gas mixture containing 20% of C4-FN (mole fraction) has a dielectric strength similar to the SF_{6} (values at 100 kPa based on the AC breakdowns in a uniform arrangement). Additionally, minor synergies were observed between 0 and 7% with breakdown values higher than what a purely linear interaction would allow. The AC breakdown voltages were also linearly increasing with pressure, ensuring a good scalability. Detailed values and additional results in weakly non-uniform and strongly non-uniform arrangements are available in the datasets.

Conclusions in the CIGRE technical brochure mention that the obtained results confirmed the applicability of the existing tests methods (including waveform ratios) and design rules from SF_{6}.
