= 1,2,3,3,3-Pentafluoropropene =

Names
- Preferred IUPAC name 1,2,3,3,3-Pentafluoroprop-1-ene

Identifiers
| CAS Number | 2252-83-7 mixture of E- and Z- isomers; 5528-43-8 Z-isomer; 5595-10-8 E-isomer |
| 3D model (JSmol) | mixture of E- and Z- isomers: Interactive image; Interactive image |
| ChemSpider | 99713 mixture of E- and Z- isomers; 4647379 Z-isomer; 4887279 E-isomer |
| ECHA InfoCard | 100.258.261 |
| PubChem CID | 111077 mixture of E- and Z- isomers; 5708673 Z-isomer; 6329539 E-isomer |
| UNII | 9WT89AU9D5 |
| CompTox Dashboard (EPA) | DTXSID9074729 |
- InChI: mixture of E- and Z- isomers: InChI=1S/C3HF5/c4-1-2(5)3(6,7)8/h1H Key: DMUPYMORYHFFCT-UHFFFAOYSA-N
- SMILES: mixture of E- and Z- isomers: C(=C(C(F)(F)F)F)F; F\C=C(/F)C(F)(F)F

Properties
| Chemical formula | C_{3}HF_{5} |
| Molar mass | 132.033 g·mol^{−1} |
| Boiling point | −14.7±8.0 °C (Z) / −18.5 °C (E) |
- Except where otherwise noted, data are given for materials in their standard state (at 25 °C [77 °F], 100 kPa). Infobox references

1,2,3,3,3-Pentafluoropropene is the unsaturated fluorocarbon with the formula HFC=C(F)CF_{3}. This colorless gas is of interest as a precursor to hydrofluoroolefins (HFOs), which are used as refrigerants in air conditioners. Of the methods reported for its synthesis, one route involves dehydrofluorination of 1,1,2,3,3,3-hexafluoropropane. The compound exists as a mixture of E- and Z-isomers.
