= Dimethylphosphine =

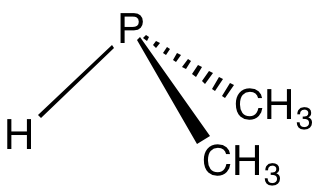

Names
- Preferred IUPAC name Dimethylphosphane

Identifiers
CAS Number	676-59-5
3D model (JSmol)	Interactive image
ChemSpider	62810
PubChem CID	69607
UNII	DRV85A28TP
CompTox Dashboard (EPA)	DTXSID40217918
- InChI: InChI=1S/C2H7P/c1-3-2/h3H,1-2H3 Key: YOTZYFSGUCFUKA-UHFFFAOYSA-N
- SMILES: CPC

Properties
Chemical formula	(CH_{3})_{2}PH
Molar mass	62.052 g·mol^{−1}
Appearance	Colorless gas or colorless liquid
Odor	Malodorous
Boiling point	21.1 °C

Hazards
- Occupational safety and health (OHS/OSH)
Main hazards	toxic
- Except where otherwise noted, data are given for materials in their standard state (at 25 °C [77 °F], 100 kPa). Infobox references

Dimethylphosphine is the organophosphorus compound with the formula (CH_{3})_{2}PH, often written Me_{2}PH. It is a malodorous gas that condenses to a colorless liquid just below room temperature. Although it can be produced by methylation of phosphine, a more practical synthesis involves the reduction of tetramethyldiphosphine disulfide with tributylphosphine:

(CH_{3})_{2}P(S)−P(S)(CH_{3})_{2} + P((CH_{2})_{3}CH_{3})_{3} + H_{2}O → (CH_{3})_{2}PH + SP((CH_{2})_{3}CH_{3})_{3} + (CH_{3})_{2}P(O)(OH)

== Reactions ==
The compound exhibits the properties characteristic of a secondary phosphine, i.e., a compound of the type R_{2}PH. It can be oxidized to the phosphinic acid:

(CH_{3})_{2}PH + O_{2} → (CH_{3})_{2}P(O)(OH)

It can be protonated to give the dimethylphosphonium ion:

(CH_{3})_{2}PH + H^{+} → [(CH_{3})_{2}PH_{2}]^{+}

With strong bases (e.g., lithium amide, it can be deprotonated to give dimethyl phosphide derivatives (e.g., lithium dimethyl phosphide):

(CH_{3})_{2}PH + LiNH_{2} → (CH_{3})_{2}PLi + NH_{3}
