= Ethylphosphine =

Names
- Other names Ethylphosphane

Identifiers
CAS Number	593-68-0
3D model (JSmol)	Interactive image
ChEBI	CHEBI:35889
ChemSpider	120154
PubChem CID	136382
CompTox Dashboard (EPA)	DTXSID90208033
- InChI: InChI=1S/C2H7P/c1-2-3/h2-3H2,1H3 Key: JLHMVTORNNQCRM-UHFFFAOYSA-N
- SMILES: CCP

Properties
Chemical formula	CH_{3}CH_{2}PH_{2}
Molar mass	62.052 g·mol^{−1}
Boiling point	25 °C (77 °F; 298 K)
- Except where otherwise noted, data are given for materials in their standard state (at 25 °C [77 °F], 100 kPa). Infobox references

Ethylphosphine is the organophosphine compound with the formula C_{2}H_{7}P, CH_{3}CH_{2}PH_{2}, or EtPH_{2}.
