= Trichlorofluorosilane =

Names
- Systematic IUPAC name Trichloro(fluoro)silane
- Other names Silicon trichloride fluoride

Identifiers
CAS Number	14965-52-7
3D model (JSmol)	Interactive image
ChemSpider	123347
PubChem CID	139862
CompTox Dashboard (EPA)	DTXSID30164361
- InChI: InChI=1S/Cl3FSi/c1-5(2,3)4 Key: PGHWHQUVLXTFLZ-UHFFFAOYSA-N
- SMILES: F[Si](Cl)(Cl)Cl

Properties
Chemical formula	SiCl_{3}F
Molar mass	153.43 g/mol
Density	1.477g/cm3
- Except where otherwise noted, data are given for materials in their standard state (at 25 °C [77 °F], 100 kPa). Infobox references

Trichlorofluorosilane (Silicon trichloride fluoride) is an inorganic compound. It is used to produce silicon for use in the manufacturing of semiconductor and fiber optic materials.
