= Dimethylsilane =

Names
- Preferred IUPAC name Dimethylsilane

Identifiers
CAS Number	1111-74-6
3D model (JSmol)	Interactive image
ChemSpider	59572
ECHA InfoCard	100.012.895
EC Number	214-184-7
UNII	8KO1673311
CompTox Dashboard (EPA)	DTXSID40870840
- InChI: InChI=1S/C2H8Si/c1-3-2/h3H2,1-2H3 Key: UBHZUDXTHNMNLD-UHFFFAOYSA-N
- SMILES: C[SiH2]C

Properties
Chemical formula	C_{2}H_{8}Si
Molar mass	60.171 g·mol^{−1}
Appearance	Colorless gas
Density	0.68 g cm^{−3}
Melting point	−150 °C (−238 °F; 123 K)
Boiling point	−20 °C (−4 °F; 253 K)

Hazards
- GHS labelling
Pictograms	(GHS02: Flammable) (GHS08: Health hazard)
Signal word	Danger
Hazard statements	H220, H340, H350
Precautionary statements	P201, P202, P210, P281, P308+P313, P377, P381, P403, P405, P410+P403, P501
NFPA 704 (fire diamond)	1 4 1
- Except where otherwise noted, data are given for materials in their standard state (at 25 °C [77 °F], 100 kPa). Infobox references

Dimethylsilane is the organosilicon compound with the formula (CH_{3})_{2}SiH_{2}. It is a flammable colorless gas. It is used in chemical vapor deposition.

== See also ==
- Trimethylsilane
