= Trimethylsilane =

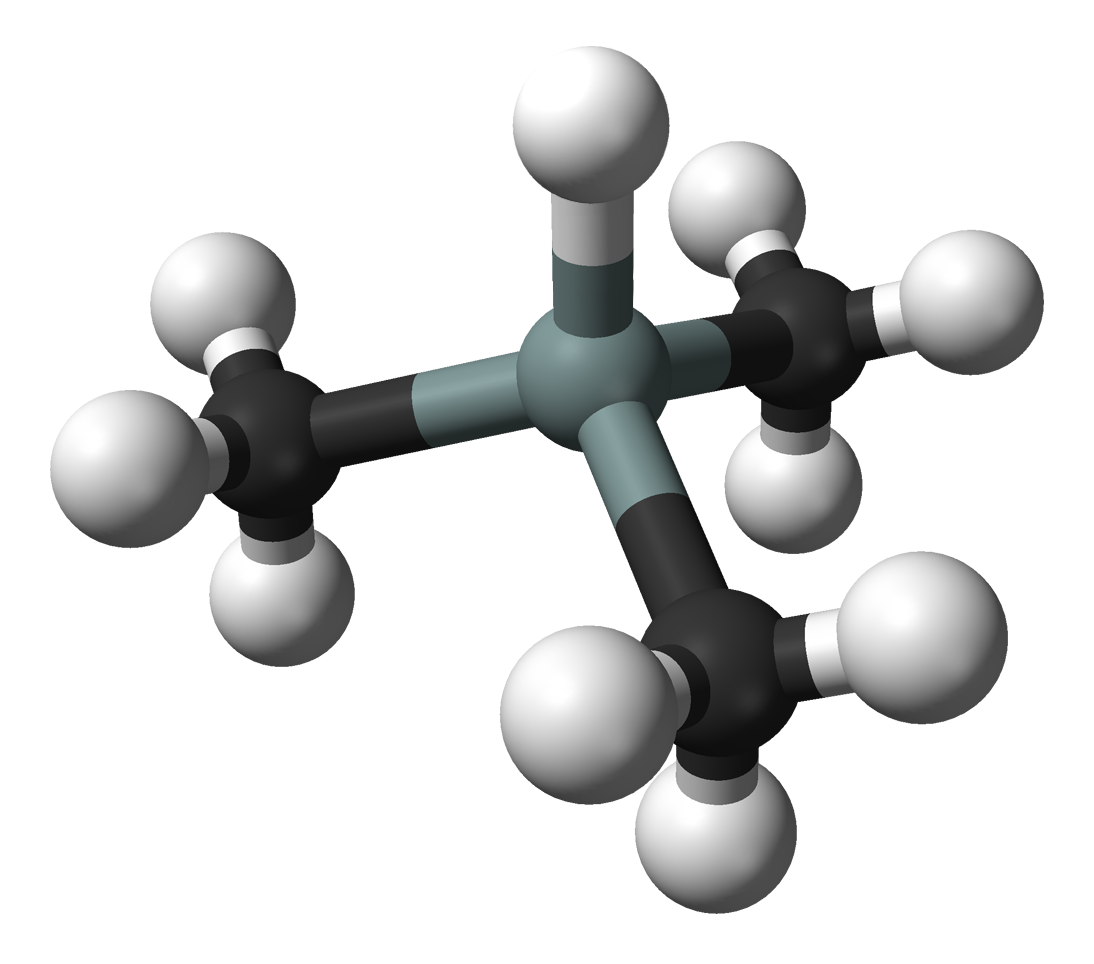

Names
- Preferred IUPAC name Trimethylsilane

Identifiers
CAS Number	993-07-7
3D model (JSmol)	Interactive image
ChemSpider	63614
ECHA InfoCard	100.012.366
EC Number	213-603-0
PubChem CID	70435
UNII	9L70DJH2K0
CompTox Dashboard (EPA)	DTXSID60870822
- InChI: InChI=1S/C3H10Si/c1-4(2)3/h4H,1-3H3 Key: PQDJYEQOELDLCP-UHFFFAOYSA-N
- SMILES: C[SiH](C)C

Properties
Chemical formula	C_{3}H_{10}Si
Molar mass	74.198 g·mol^{−1}
Appearance	Colorless gas
Density	0.638 g cm^{−3}
Melting point	−135.9 °C (−212.6 °F; 137.2 K)
Boiling point	6.7 °C (44.1 °F; 279.8 K)

Hazards
- GHS labelling
Pictograms	(GHS02: Flammable) (GHS07: Exclamation mark)
Signal word	Danger
Hazard statements	H220, H224, H315, H319, H335
Precautionary statements	P210, P233, P240, P241, P242, P243, P261, P264, P271, P280, P302+P352, P303+P361+P353, P304+P340, P305+P351+P338, P312, P321, P332+P313, P337+P313, P362, P370+P378, P377, P381, P403, P403+P233, P403+P235, P405, P410+P403, P501
NFPA 704 (fire diamond)	2 4 1
- Except where otherwise noted, data are given for materials in their standard state (at 25 °C [77 °F], 100 kPa). Infobox references

Trimethylsilane is the organosilicon compound with the formula (CH_{3})_{3}SiH. It is a colorless gas. It is a trialkylsilane. The Si-H bond is reactive. Being a gas, it is less commonly used as a reagent than the related triethylsilane, which is a liquid at room temperature.

Trimethylsilane is used in the semiconductor industry as precursor to deposit dielectrics and barrier layers via plasma-enhanced chemical vapor deposition (PE-CVD). It is also used a source gas to deposit TiSiCN hard coatings via plasma-enhanced magnetron sputtering (PEMS). It has also been used to deposit silicon carbide hard coatings via low-pressure chemical vapor deposition (LP-CVD) at relatively low temperatures under 1000 °C. It is an expensive gas but safer to use than silane (SiH_{4}); and produces properties in the coatings that cannot be undertaken by multiple source gases containing silicon and carbon.

== See also ==
- Dimethylsilane
- Trimethylsilyl functional group
