= Digermane =

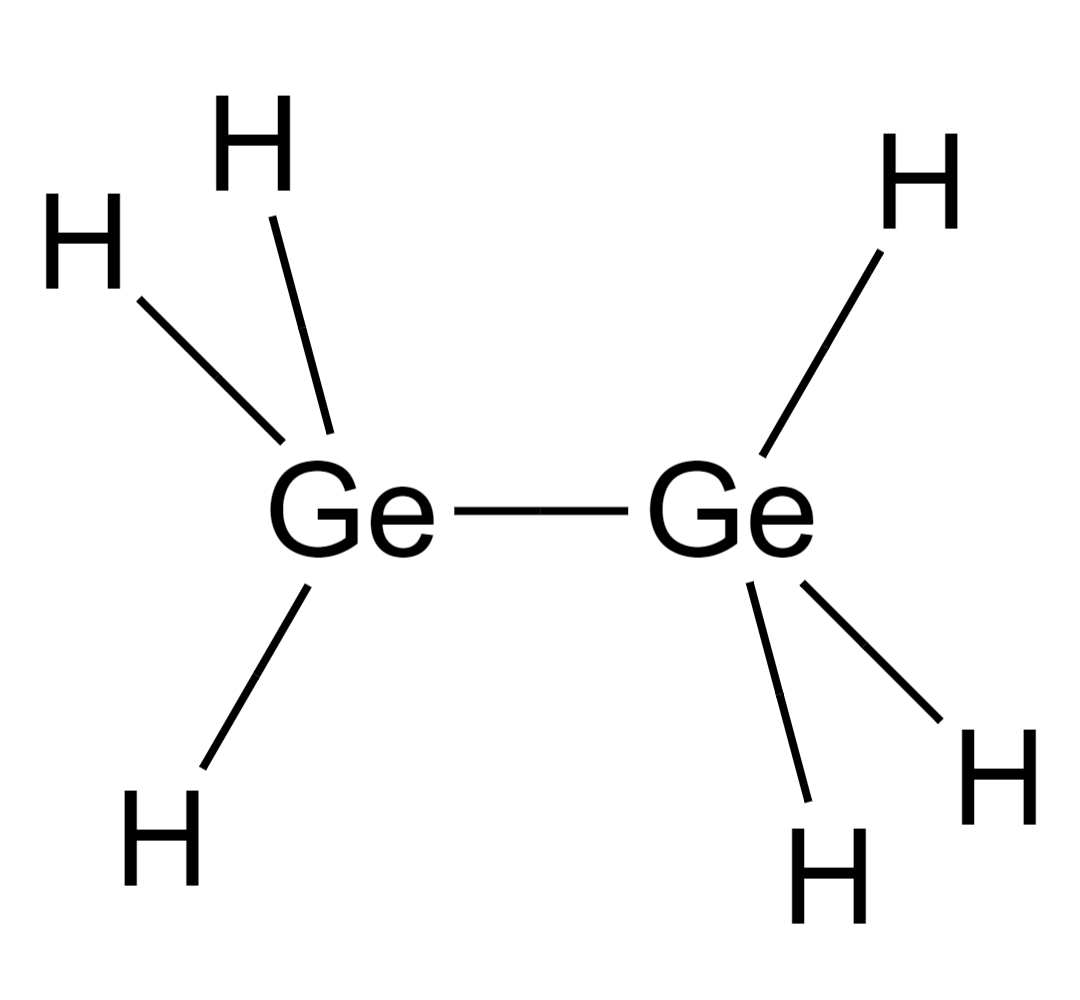

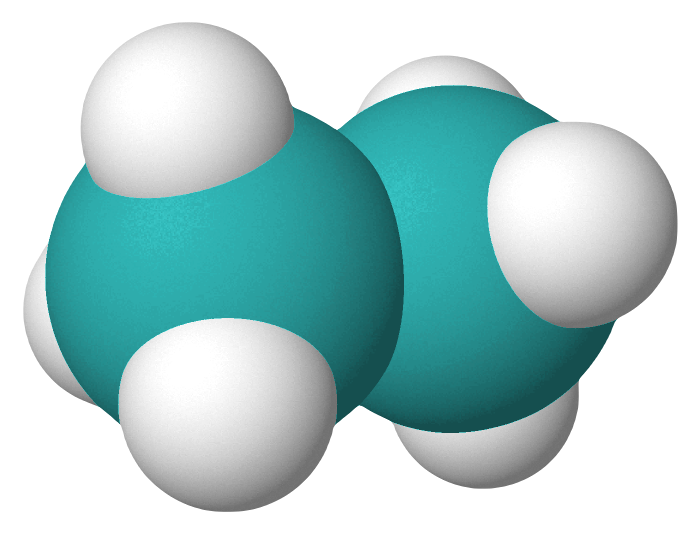

Names
- IUPAC name Digermane

Identifiers
CAS Number	13818-89-8
3D model (JSmol)	Interactive image
ChemSpider	20137807
ECHA InfoCard	100.159.079
PubChem CID	6336261 PubChem has bad name
CompTox Dashboard (EPA)	DTXSID801030397
- InChI: InChI=1S/Ge2H6/c1-2/h1-2H3 Key: MOFQWXUCFOZALF-UHFFFAOYSA-N; InChI=1/Ge2H6/c1-2/h1-2H3 Key: MOFQWXUCFOZALF-UHFFFAOYAF
- SMILES: [GeH3][GeH3]

Properties
Chemical formula	Ge_{2}H_{6}
Molar mass	151.308 g·mol^{−1}
Appearance	Colorless gas
Density	1.98 kg/m^{3}
Melting point	−109 °C (−164 °F; 164 K)
Boiling point	29 °C (84 °F; 302 K)
Solubility in water	Insoluble

Hazards
- GHS labelling
Pictograms	(GHS02: Flammable) (GHS06: Toxic) (GHS07: Exclamation mark)
Signal word	Danger
Hazard statements	H220, H302, H312, H315, H319, H330, H335
Precautionary statements	P210, P260, P264, P270, P271, P280, P284, P301+P312, P302+P352, P304+P340, P305+P351+P338, P310, P312, P320, P321, P330, P332+P313, P337+P313, P362, P363, P377, P381, P403, P403+P233, P405, P501

Related compounds
Related compounds	Ethane; Disilane
- Except where otherwise noted, data are given for materials in their standard state (at 25 °C [77 °F], 100 kPa). Infobox references

Digermane is an inorganic compound with the chemical formula Ge_{2}H_{6}. One of the few hydrides of germanium, it is a colourless liquid. Its molecular geometry is similar to ethane.

== Synthesis ==
Digermane was first synthesized and examined in 1924 by Dennis, Corey, and Moore. Their method involves the hydrolysis of magnesium germanide using hydrochloric acid. Many of the properties of digermane and trigermane GeH_{3}GeH_{2}GeH_{3} were determined in the following decade using electron diffraction studies. Further considerations of the compound involved examinations of various reactions such as pyrolysis and oxidation.

Digermane is produced together with germane by the reduction of germanium dioxide with sodium borohydride. Although the major product is germane, a quantifiable amount of digermane is produced in addition to traces of trigermane. It also arises by the hydrolysis of magnesium-germanium alloys.

== Reactions ==
The reactions of digermane exhibit some differences between analogous compounds of the Group 14 elements carbon and silicon. However, there are still some similarities seen, especially in regard to pyrolysis reactions.

The oxidation of digermane takes place at lower temperatures than monogermane. The product of the reaction, germanium oxide, has been shown to act in turn as a catalyst of the reaction. This exemplifies a fundamental difference between germanium and the other Group 14 elements carbon and silicon (carbon dioxide and silicon dioxide do not exhibit the same catalytic properties).

2 Ge_{2}H_{6} + 7 O_{2} → 4 GeO_{2} + 6 H_{2}O

In liquid ammonia, digermane undergoes disproportionation. Ammonia acts as a weakly basic catalyst. Products of the reaction are hydrogen, germane, and a solid polymeric germanium hydride.

Pyrolysis of digermane is proposed to follow multiple steps:

Ge_{2}H_{6} → 2 GeH_{3}
GeH_{3} + Ge_{2}H_{6} → GeH_{4} + Ge_{2}H_{5}
Ge_{2}H_{5} → GeH_{2} + GeH_{3}
GeH_{2} → Ge + H_{2}
2 GeH_{2} → GeH_{4} + Ge
n GeH_{2} → (GeH_{2})_{n}

This pyrolysis has been found to be more endothermic than the pyrolysis of disilane. This difference is attributed to the greater strength of the Ge-H bond vs the Si-H bond. As seen in the last reaction of the mechanism above, pyrolysis of digermane may induce polymerization of the GeH_{2} group, where GeH_{3} acts as a chain propagator and molecular hydrogen gas is released. The dehydrogenation of digermane on gold leads to the formation of germanium nanowires.

Digermane is a precursor to GeH_{3}−GH_{2}−E−CF_{3}, where E is either sulfur or selenium. These trifluoromethylthio (−S−CF_{3}) and trifluoromethylseleno (−Se−CF_{3}) derivatives possess a markedly higher thermal stability than digermane itself.

== Applications ==
Digermane has a limited number of applications; germane itself is the preferred volatile germanium hydride. Generally, digermane is primarily used a precursor to germanium for use in various applications. Digermane can be used to deposit Ge-containing semiconductors via chemical vapor deposition.
