= Trifluorosilane =

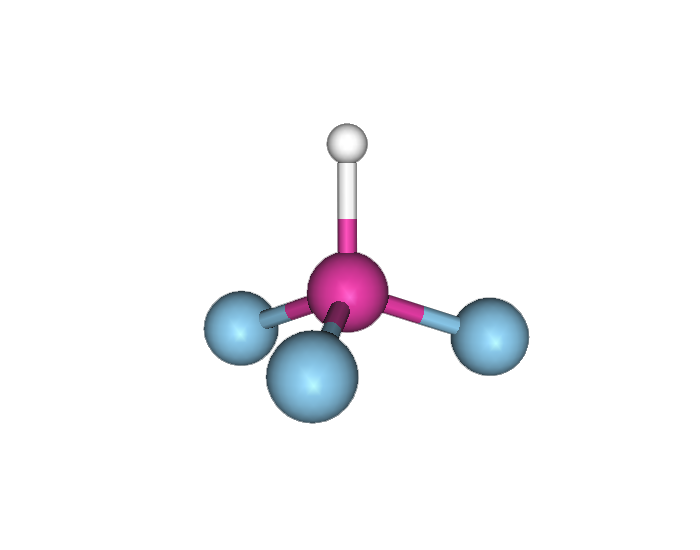

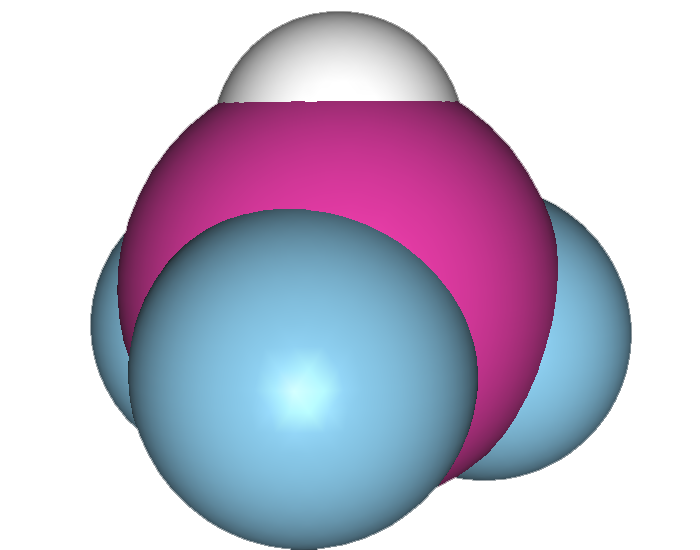

Names
- IUPAC name Trifluorosilane

Identifiers
| CAS Number | 13465-71-9 |
| 3D model (JSmol) | Interactive image |
| ChemSpider | 122985 |
| PubChem CID | 139462 |
| CompTox Dashboard (EPA) | DTXSID70928707 |
- InChI: InChI=1S/F3HSi/c1-4(2)3/h4H Key: WPPVEXTUHHUEIV-UHFFFAOYSA-N; InChI=1S/F3HSi/c1-4(2)3/h4H Key: ZDHXKXAHOVTTAH-UHFFFAOYAH
- SMILES: F[SiH](F)F

Properties
| Chemical formula | HF_{3}Si |
| Molar mass | 86.09 g/mol |
| Appearance | Colorless gas |
| Density | 1.86 g/cm^{3} |
| Melting point | −131 °C (−204 °F; 142 K) |
| Boiling point | −97.5 °C (−143.5 °F; 175.7 K) |
- Except where otherwise noted, data are given for materials in their standard state (at 25 °C [77 °F], 100 kPa). Infobox references

Trifluorosilane is the chemical compound with the formula F_{3}HSi. At standard temperature and pressure, trifluorosilane is a colorless gas. Note that the free radical F_{3}Si is often also referred to as trifluorosilane, although more properly referred to as trifluorosilyl.

== Preparation ==
Trifluorosilane has been purified and separated by low-temperature high-vacuum distillation. One preparation method involves products of the reaction between SbF_{3} and HSiCl_{3}. HSiCl_{3} is obtained by copper catalyzed reaction between HCl and Silicon at 200-400 °C.

Formation has also been reported in certain etching operations of silicon.

== Properties ==
The electric dipole moment of trifluorosilane is 1.26 debye. The length of the silicon to fluorine bond is 1.555 Å, Si-H length is 1.55 Å, and ∠FSiF is 110°.
