= List of refrigerants =

This is a list of refrigerants, sorted by their ASHRAE-designated numbers, commonly known as R numbers. Many modern refrigerants are human-made halogenated gases, especially fluorinated gases and chlorinated gases, that are frequently referred to as Freon (a registered trademark of Chemours).

Freons are responsible for the formation of the ozone hole. The Vienna Convention for the Protection of the Ozone Layer and the Montreal Protocol are international agreements that oblige signatory countries to limit the emission of ozone-depleting gases. The Kigali Amendment to the Montreal Protocol furthermore obliges signatory countries to limit the emission of gases with high global warming potential.

== Numbering scheme ==
According to ASHRAE standard 34, the R-number of a chemical refrigerant is assigned systematically according to its molecular structure and has between two and four digits, inclusive. If there are carbon-carbon multiple bonds, there are four digits in all: the number of these bonds is the first digit and the number of carbon atoms minus one (C − 1) is next. If there is more than one carbon atom but no multiple bonds, there are three digits, and the number of carbon atoms minus one is the first digit. If there is only one carbon atom, then there are only two digits. The last two digits are always the number of hydrogen atoms plus one (H + 1), followed by the number of fluorine atoms. Any other atoms attached to the carbons are assumed to be chlorine atoms. For example, R-22 has one carbon atom (1 − 1 = 0), one hydrogen atom (1 + 1 = 2), two fluorine atoms (2), and one chlorine atom (4 − 2 − 1 = 1), so it is chlorodifluoromethane, while R-134 has two carbon atoms (2 − 1 = 1), two hydrogen atoms (2 + 1 = 3), four fluorine atoms (4), and no chlorine atoms (6 − 2 − 4 = 0), so it is one of the tetrafluoroethanes. This basic scheme is modified as follows:

- Capital letters "B" and "I" are suffixed, together with atom counts, if chlorine atoms have been replaced with bromine or iodine.
- If there are two carbons, the isomer without suffix is the most symmetrical; after this, lower-case suffixed letters "a", "b", ..., are added, moving forwards through the alphabet as symmetry decreases.
- If there are more than two carbons, a more complex system of suffixed letters and possibly numbers is used to distinguish isomers, when necessary.
- The suffixes "(Z)" and "(E)" may be used to differentiate (Z)- and (E)- (cis- and trans-) isomers.
- For larger molecules, numerical "digits" exceeding 9 may occur; in this case, these numbers are separated by dashes.
- For a cyclic carbon skeleton, the prefixed capital letter "C" is used.
- For an oxygen-containing refrigerant (an ether), the prefixed capital letter "E" is used.

There are separate numbering schemes for zeotropic and azeotropic blends, organic chemicals which don't fit into the scheme above, and inorganic chemicals:

- Zeotropic blends are numbered starting with 400. Suffixed capital letters "A", "B", ... may be used to distinguish different blends with the same constitutents.
- Azeotropic blends are numbered similarly to zeotropic blends, but starting with 500.
- Other organic chemicals may be numbered starting with 600. Suffixed lowercase letters "a", "b", ..., may be used to distinguish isomers.
- Inorganic chemicals are given numbers equalling 700 plus their molecular weight, if the weight is less than 100, or 7000 plus the molecular weight otherwise. Suffixed capital letters "A", "B", ... may be used to distinguish different chemicals with the same molecular weight.

== Columns ==
The table is sortable by each of the following refrigerant properties (scroll right or reduce magnification to view more properties):

- Type/prefix (see legends)
- ASHRAE number
- IUPAC chemical name
- molecular formula
- CAS registry number / blend name
- Atmospheric lifetime in years
- Semi-empirical ozone depletion potential, ODP (normalized to be 1 for R-11)
- Net global warming potential, GWP, over a 100-year time horizon (normalized to be 1 for R-744, carbon dioxide)
- Occupational exposure limit/permissible exposure limit in parts per million (volume per volume) over a time-weighted average (TWA) concentration for a normal eight-hour work day and a 40-hour work week
- ASHRAE 34 safety group in toxicity & flammability (in air @ 60 °C, 101.3 kPa) classing (see legends)
- Refrigerant concentration limit / immediately dangerous to life or health in parts per million (volume per volume) and grams per cubic meter
- Molecular mass in daltons
- Normal boiling points for pure substances, bubble and dew points for zeotropic blends, or normal boiling point and azeotropic temperature for the azeotropic blends, at 101325 Pa (1 atmosphere) and in degrees Celsius
- Critical temperature in degrees Celsius
- Absolute critical pressure in kilopascals

Since over 100000 refrigerant blends are possible, this list should only have notable refrigerants and refrigerant blends.

== List ==
Type	ASHRAE number	IUPAC chemical name	Molecular formula	CAS no/ blend name	Atmospheric lifetime (years)	Semi- empirical ODP (R-11 = 1)	Net GWP 100-yr (R-744 = 1)	OEL/PEL ppm (v/v) & ASHRAE 34 safety group	RCL/IDLH (ppm v/v, followed by g/m^{3})		Molecular mass Da	Boiling, or bubble/dew /azeotropic point(s) °C	Critical temp. °C	Critical pressure, absolute kPa											
Type	ASHRAE number	IUPAC chemical name	Molecular formula	CAS no/ blend name	Atmospheric lifetime (years)	Semi- empirical ODP (R-11 = 1)	Net GWP 100-yr (R-744 = 1)	OEL/PEL ppm (v/v) & ASHRAE 34 safety group	PCC	R-10	Molecular mass Da	Boiling, or bubble/dew /azeotropic point(s) °C	Critical temp. °C	Critical pressure, absolute kPa	carbon tetrachloride (tetrachloromethane)	CCl_{4}	56-23-5	26	1.2	1,400	100? B1	153.8	76.72	283.35	4,560
CFC	R-11	trichlorofluoromethane	CCl_{3}F	75-69-4	45	1.0	4,660	1,000 A1	1,100	6.2	137.4	23.77	197.96	4,408											
CFC	R-12	dichlorodifluoromethane	CCl_{2}F_{2}	75-71-8	100	1.0	10,200	1,000 A1	18,000	90	120.9	−29.8	111.97	4,136											
H	R-12B1	bromochlorodifluoromethane	CBrClF_{2} or CF_{2}ClBr	353-59-3	16	7.1	1,750				165.4	−3.7	153.8	4,102											
H	R-12B2	dibromodifluoromethane	CBr_{2}F_{2}	75-61-6	2.9	1.7					209.8	22.8	198.11	4,130											
CFC	R-13	chlorotrifluoromethane	CClF_{3}	75-72-9	640	1	13,900	1,000 A1	40,000?	200?	104.5	−81.5	28.73	3,877											
H	R-13B1	bromotrifluoromethane	CBrF_{3} or CF_{3}Br	75-63-8	65	16	6,290	1,000 A1			148.9	−57.75	67	3,964											
H	R-13I1	trifluoroiodomethane	CF_{3}I	2314-97-8				500 A1			195.9	−21.9													
PFC	R-14	tetrafluoromethane	CF_{4}	75-73-0	50,000	0	7,390	1,000 A1	110,000	400	88	−127.8	−45.64	3,750											
HCC	R-20	chloroform (trichloromethane)	CHCl_{3}	67-66-3	0.51		31				119.4	61.2	262.35	5,480											
HCFC	R-21	dichlorofluoromethane	CHFCl_{2}	75-43-4	1.7	0.04	148	100? B1			102.9	8.92	178.45	5,180											
HCFC	R-22	chlorodifluoromethane	CHClF_{2}	75-45-6	12.0	0.055	1,760	1,000 A1	59,000	210	86.5	−40.7	96.14	4,990											
H	R-22B1	bromodifluoromethane	CHBrF_{2} or CHF_{2}Br	1511-62-2	5.8	0.74	404				130.9	−14.6	138.83	5,132											
HFC	R-23	trifluoromethane (fluoroform)	CHF_{3}	75-46-7	270	0	12,400	1,000 A1	41,000	120	70	−82.1	25.92	4,836											
HCC	R-30	dichloromethane (methylene chloride)	CH_{2}Cl_{2}	75-09-2	0.38	0	8.7	100? B2			84.9	39.6	235.15	6,080											
HCFC	R-31	chlorofluoromethane	CH_{2}FCl	593-70-4		0.02		350? B2?	10,000?	20?	68.5	−9.1	151.76	5,131											
HFC	R-32	difluoromethane	CH_{2}F_{2}	75-10-5	4.9	0	677	1,000 A2L	36,000	77	52	−52	78.11	5,782											
HCC	R-40	chloromethane	CH_{3}Cl	74-87-3	1.0	0.02	13	100? B2			50.5	−24.2	143.05	6,660											
HFC	R-41	fluoromethane	CH_{3}F	593-53-3	2.4	0	116				34	−78.2	44.13	5,897											
HC	R-50	methane	CH_{4}	74-82-8	12 ± 3	<0(smog)	28	1,000 A3	9,000?	9?	16.04	−162±2	−82.3	4,640											
PCC	R-110	hexachloroethane	C_{2}Cl_{6}	67-72-1							236.7		431.28	3,937											
CFC	R-111	pentachlorofluoroethane	C_{2}FCl_{5}	354-56-3		1					220.3	135													
CFC	R-112	1,1,2,2-tetrachloro-1,2-difluoroethane	C_{2}F_{2}Cl_{4}	76-12-0		1					203.8														
CFC	R-112a	1,1,1,2-tetrachloro-2,2-difluoroethane	C_{2}F_{2}Cl_{4}	76-11-9		1 (Note: Some CFCs are assumed to be similar in terms of semi-empirical ODP being one.)					203.8														
CFC	R-113	1,1,2-trichloro-1,2,2-trifluoroethane	C_{2}F_{3}Cl_{3}	76-13-1	85	1.0	5,820	1,000 A1	2,600	20	187.4	48	214.06	3,392											
CFC	R-113a	1,1,1-trichloro-2,2,2-trifluoroethane	C_{2}F_{3}Cl_{3}	354-58-5		1					187.4														
CFC	R-114	1,2-dichlorotetrafluoroethane	C_{2}F_{4}Cl_{2}	76-14-2	300	1.0	8,590	1,000 A1	20,000	140	170.9	3.5	145.68	3,257											
CFC	R-114a	1,1-dichlorotetrafluoroethane	C_{2}F_{4}Cl_{2}	374-07-2		1					170.9														
H	R-114B2	dibromotetrafluoroethane	C_{2}F_{4}Br_{2} or CF_{2}BrCF_{2}Br	124-73-2	20	11.5	1,470				259.8	47.3	214.67												
CFC	R-115	chloropentafluoroethane	C_{2}F_{5}Cl	76-15-3	1,700	0.44	7,670	1,000 A1	120,000	760	154.5	−39.1	79.95	3,120											
PFC	R-116	hexafluoroethane	C_{2}F_{6}	76-16-4	10,000	0	12,200	1,000 A1	97,000	550	138	−78.2	19.88	3,042											
HCC	R-120	pentachloroethane	C_{2}HCl_{5}	76-01-7							202.3														
HCFC	R-121	1,1,2,2-tetrachloro-1-fluoroethane	C_{2}HFCl_{4}	354-14-3		0.01–0.04					185.8														
HCFC	R-121a	1,1,1,2-tetrachloro-2-fluoroethane	C_{2}HFCl_{4}	354-11-0		0.01–0.04 (Note: Some HCFCs are assumed to be similar in terms of Semi-Empirical ODP.)					185.8														
HCFC	R-122	1,1,2-trichloro-2,2-difluoroethane	C_{2}HF_{2}Cl_{3}	354-21-2		0.02–0.08					169.4														
HCFC	R-122a	1,1,2-trichloro-1,2-difluoroethane	C_{2}HF_{2}Cl_{3}	354-15-4		0.02–0.08					169.4														
HCFC	R-122b	1,1,1-trichloro-2,2-difluoroethane	C_{2}HF_{2}Cl_{3}	354-12-1		0.02–0.08					169.4														
HCFC	R-123	2,2-dichloro-1,1,1-trifluoroethane	C_{2}HF_{3}Cl_{2}	306-83-2	1.3	0.02	79	50 B1	9,100	57	152.9	27.6	183.68	3,662											
HCFC	R-123a	1,2-dichloro-1,1,2-trifluoroethane	C_{2}HF_{3}Cl_{2}	354-23-4	1.3? (Note: Some HCFCs are assumed to be similar in terms of Atmospheric Lifetime & net GWP over a 100-year time horizon.)	0.02?	77?				152.9														
HCFC	R-123b	1,1-dichloro-1,2,2-trifluoroethane	C_{2}HF_{3}Cl_{2}	812-04-4	1.3?	0.02?	77?				152.9														
HCFC	R-124	1-chloro-1,2,2,2-tetrafluoroethane	C_{2}HF_{4}Cl	2837-89-0	5.8	0.022	527	1,000 A1	10,000	56	136.5	−12	122.28	3,624											
HCFC	R-124a	1-chloro-1,1,2,2-tetrafluoroethane	C_{2}HF_{4}Cl	354-25-6	5.8?	0.022?	609?				136.5														
HFC	R-125	pentafluoroethane	C_{2}HF_{5}	354-33-6	29	0	3,170	1,000 A1	75,000	370	120	−48.5	66.18	3,629											
HFC	R-E125	pentafluorodimethyl ether	C_{2}F_{5}OC_{2}F_{5}	3822-68-2	136	0 (Note: All HFCs, HFOs, PFCs & PFOs are assumed to be similar in terms of semi-empirical ODP being zero.)	14,900				136														
HCC	R-130	1,1,2,2-tetrachloroethane	C_{2}H_{2}Cl_{4}	79-34-5							167.8	146.5	388.06	5,840											
HCC	R-130a	1,1,1,2-tetrachloroethane	C_{2}H_{2}Cl_{4}	630-20-6							167.8	130.5													
HCFC	R-131	1,1,2-trichloro-2-fluoroethane	C_{2}H_{2}FCl_{3}	359-28-4		0.007–0.05					151.4														
HCFC	R-131a	1,1,2-trichloro-1-fluoroethane	C_{2}H_{2}FCl_{3}	811-95-0		0.007–0.05					151.4														
HCFC	R-131b	1,1,1-trichloro-2-fluoroethane	C_{2}H_{2}FCl_{3}	2366-36-1		0.007–0.05					151.4														
HCFC	R-132	1,2-dichloro-1,2-difluoroethane	C_{2}H_{2}F_{2}Cl_{2}	431-06-1		0.008–0.05					134.9														
HCFC	R-132a	1,1-dichloro-2,2-difluoroethane	C_{2}H_{2}F_{2}Cl_{2}	471-43-2		0.008–0.05					134.9														
HCFC	R-132b	1,2-Dichloro-1,1-difluoroethane	C_{2}H_{2}F_{2}Cl_{2}	1649-08-7		0.008–0.05					134.9														
HCFC	R-132c	1,1-Dichloro-1,2-difluoroethane	C_{2}H_{2}F_{2}Cl_{2}	1842-05-3		0.008–0.05					134.9														
H	R-132bB2	1,2-dibromo-1,1-difluoroethane	C_{2}H_{2}Br_{2}F_{2}	75-82-1		0.2–1.5					223.8														
HCFC	R-133	1-chloro-1,2,2-Trifluoroethane	C_{2}H_{2}F_{3}Cl	431-07-2		0.02–0.06					118.5														
HCFC	R-133a	1-chloro-2,2,2-trifluoroethane	C_{2}H_{2}F_{3}Cl	75-88-7		0.02–0.06					118.5														
HCFC	R-133b	1-chloro-1,1,2-trifluoroethane	C_{2}H_{2}F_{3}Cl	421-04-5		0.02–0.06					118.5														
HFC	R-134	1,1,2,2-tetrafluoroethane	C_{2}H_{2}F_{4}	359-35-3	9.6	0	1,120				102														
HFC	R-134a	1,1,1,2-tetrafluoroethane	C_{2}H_{2}F_{4}	811-97-2	14	0	1,300	1,000 A1	50,000	210	102	−26.3	101.06	4,059											
HFC	R-E134	bis(difluoromethyl)ether	C_{2}H_{2}F_{4}O	1691-17-4	26	0	6,320				118														
HCC	R-140	1,1,2-trichloroethane	C_{2}H_{3}Cl_{3}	79-00-5							133.4	112.5±2.5													
HCC	R-140a	1,1,1-trichloroethane (methyl chloroform)	C_{2}H_{3}Cl_{3} or CH_{3}CCl_{3}	71-55-6	5.0	0.12	160				133.4	74													
HCFC	R-141	1,2-dichloro-1-fluoroethane	C_{2}H_{3}FCl_{2}	430-57-9	9.3?	0.12?	725?				116.9														
H	R-141B2	1,2-dibromo-1-fluoroethane	C_{2}H_{3}Br_{2}F	358-97-4		0.1–1.7					205.9														
HCFC	R-141a	1,1-dichloro-2-fluoroethane	C_{2}H_{3}FCl_{2}	430-53-5	9.3?	0.12?	725?				116.9														
HCFC	R-141b	1,1-dichloro-1-fluoroethane	C_{2}H_{3}FCl_{2}	1717-00-6	9.3	0.12	725	500 A2?	2,600	12	116.9	32	204.2	4,250											
HCFC	R-142a	1-chloro-1,2-difluoroethane	C_{2}H_{3}F_{2}Cl	338-64-7	17.9?	0.07?	2,310?				100.5														
HCFC	R-142b	1-chloro-1,1-difluoroethane	C_{2}H_{3}F_{2}Cl	75-68-3	17.9	0.07	2,310	1,000 A2	20,000	83	100.5	−10	137.1	4,123											
HFC	R-143	1,1,2-trifluoroethane	C_{2}H_{3}F_{3}	430-66-0	3.5	0	328				84														
HFC	R-143a	1,1,1-trifluoroethane	C_{2}H_{3}F_{3}	420-46-2	52	0	4,800	1,000 A2L	21,000	70	84	−47.6	72.89	3,776											
HFC	R-E143a	methyl trifluoromethyl ether	C_{2}H_{3}F_{3}O	421-14-7	4.3	0	756				100														
HCC	R-150	1,2-dichloroethane	C_{2}H_{4}Cl_{2}	107-06-2							99	84	292.83	5,370											
HCC	R-150a	1,1-dichloroethane	C_{2}H_{4}Cl_{2}	75-34-3							99	57.2	249.83	5,070											
HCFC	R-151	1-chloro-2-fluoroethane	C_{2}H_{4}ClF	762-50-5							82.5														
HCFC	R-151a	1-chloro-1-fluoroethane	C_{2}H_{4}ClF	1615-75-4							82.5														
HFC	R-152	1,2-difluoroethane	C_{2}H_{4}F_{2}	624-72-6	0.60	0	16				66														
HFC	R-152a	1,1-difluoroethane	C_{2}H_{4}F_{2}	75-37-6	1.4	0	138	1,000 A2	12,000	32	66	−25	113.26	4,517											
HCC	R-160	chloroethane (ethyl chloride)	C_{2}H_{5}Cl	75-00-3							64.5	12.3	187.28	5,268											
HFC	R-161	fluoroethane	C_{2}H_{5}F	353-36-6	0.3	0	4				48.1		102.22	4,702											
HC	R-170	ethane	C_{2}H_{6} or CH_{3}CH_{3}	74-84-0	58 days	< 0(smog) (Note: Most hydrocarbons are assumed to be similar to methane in terms of atmospheric lifetime being 12 ± 3 years & semi-empirical ODP being < 0(smog chemistry).)	5.5–10.2	1,000 A3	7,000	8.7	30.07	−88.6	32.18	4,872											
HC	R-E170	dimethyl ether	CH_{3}OCH_{3}	115-10-6	0.015	< 0(smog)	1	1,000 A3	8,500	16	46.1	−24													
CFC	R-211	1,1,1,2,2,3,3-heptachloro-3-fluoropropane	C_{3}FCl_{7}	422-78-6		1					303.2														
CFC	R-212	hexachlorodifluoropropane	C_{3}F_{2}Cl_{6}	134452-44-1		1					286.7														
CFC	R-213	1,1,1,3,3-pentachloro-2,2,3-trifluoropropane	C_{3}F_{3}Cl_{5}	2354-06-5		1					270.3														
CFC	R-214	1,2,2,3-tetrachloro-1,1,3,3-tetrafluoropropane	C_{3}F_{4}Cl_{4}	2268-46-4		1					253.8														
CFC	R-215	1,1,1-trichloro-2,2,3,3,3-pentafluoropropane	C_{3}F_{5}Cl_{3}	4259-43-2		1					237.4														
CFC	R-216	1,2-dichloro-1,1,2,3,3,3-hexafluoropropane	C_{3}F_{6}Cl_{2}	661-97-2		1					220.9														
CFC	R-216ca	1,3-dichloro-1,1,2,2,3,3-hexafluoropropane	C_{3}F_{6}Cl_{2}	662-01-1		1					220.9														
CFC	R-217	1-chloro-1,1,2,2,3,3,3-heptafluoropropane	C_{3}F_{7}Cl	422-86-6		1					204.5														
CFC	R-217ba	2-chloro-1,1,1,2,3,3,3-heptafluoropropane	C_{3}F_{7}Cl	76-18-6		1					204.5														
PFC	R-218	octafluoropropane	C_{3}F_{8}	76-19-7	2,600	0	8,830	1,000 A1	90,000	690	188	−36.7													
HCFC	R-221	1,1,1,2,2,3-hexachloro-3-fluoropropane	C_{3}HFCl_{6}	422-26-4		0.015–0.07					268.7														
HCFC	R-222	pentachlorodifluoropropane	C_{3}HF_{2}Cl_{5}	134237-36-8		0.01–0.09					252.3														
HCFC	R-222c	1,1,1,3,3-pentachloro-2,2-difluoropropane	C_{3}HF_{2}Cl_{5}	422-49-1		0.01–0.09					252.3														
HCFC	R-223	tetrachlorotrifluoropropane	C_{3}HF_{3}Cl_{4}	134237-37-9		0.01–0.08					235.8														
HCFC	R-223ca	1,1,3,3-tetrachloro-1,2,2-trifluoropropane	C_{3}HF_{3}Cl_{4}	422-52-6		0.01–0.08					235.8														
HCFC	R-223cb	1,1,1,3-tetrachloro-2,2,3-trifluoropropane	C_{3}HF_{3}Cl_{4}	422-50-4		0.01–0.08					235.8														
HCFC	R-224	trichlorotetrafluoropropane	C_{3}HF_{4}Cl_{3}	134237-38-0		0.01–0.09					219.4														
HCFC	R-224ca	1,3,3-trichloro-1,1,2,2-tetrafluoropropane	C_{3}HF_{4}Cl_{3}	422-54-8		0.01–0.09					219.4														
HCFC	R-224cb	1,1,3-trichloro-1,2,2,3-tetrafluoropropane	C_{3}HF_{4}Cl_{3}	422-53-7		0.01–0.09					219.4														
HCFC	R-224cc	1,1,1-trichloro-2,2,3,3-tetrafluoropropane	C_{3}HF_{4}Cl_{3}	422-51-5		0.01–0.09					219.4														
HCFC	R-225	dichloropentafluoropropane	C_{3}HF_{5}Cl_{2}	127564-92-5		0.01–0.05					202.9														
HCFC	R-225aa	2,2-dichloro-1,1,1,3,3-pentafluoropropane	C_{3}HF_{5}Cl_{2}	128903-21-9		0.01–0.05					202.9														
HCFC	R-225ba	2,3-dichloro-1,1,1,2,3-pentafluoropropane	C_{3}HF_{5}Cl_{2}	422-48-0		0.01–0.05					202.9														
HCFC	R-225bb	1,2-dichloro-1,1,2,3,3-pentafluoropropane	C_{3}HF_{5}Cl_{2}	422-44-6		0.01–0.05					202.9														
HCFC	R-225ca	3,3-dichloro-1,1,1,2,2-pentafluoropropane	C_{3}HF_{5}Cl_{2}	422-56-0	1.9	0.02	127				202.9														
HCFC	R-225cb	1,3-dichloro-1,1,2,2,3-pentafluoropropane	C_{3}HF_{5}Cl_{2}	507-55-1	5.8	0.03	525				202.9														
HCFC	R-225cc	1,1-dichloro-1,2,2,3,3-pentafluoropropane	C_{3}HF_{5}Cl_{2}	13474-88-9		0.01–0.05					202.9														
HCFC	R-225da	1,2-dichloro-1,1,3,3,3-pentafluoropropane	C_{3}HF_{5}Cl_{2}	431-86-7		0.01–0.05					202.9														
HCFC	R-225ea	1,3-dichloro-1,1,2,3,3-pentafluoropropane	C_{3}HF_{5}Cl_{2}	136013-79-1		0.01–0.05					202.9														
HCFC	R-225eb	1,1-dichloro-1,2,3,3,3-pentafluoropropane	C_{3}HF_{5}Cl_{2}	111512-56-2		0.01–0.05					202.9														
HCFC	R-226	chlorohexafluoropropane	C_{3}HF_{6}Cl	134308-72-8		0.02–0.1					186.5														
HCFC	R-226ba	2-chloro-1,1,1,2,3,3-hexafluoropropane	C_{3}HF_{6}Cl	51346-64-6		0.02–0.1					186.5														
HCFC	R-226ca	3-chloro-1,1,1,2,2,3-hexafluoropropane	C_{3}HF_{6}Cl	422-57-1		0.02–0.1					186.5														
HCFC	R-226cb	1-chloro-1,1,2,2,3,3-hexafluoropropane	C_{3}HF_{6}Cl	422-55-9		0.02–0.1					186.5														
HCFC	R-226da	2-chloro-1,1,1,3,3,3-hexafluoropropane	C_{3}HF_{6}Cl	431-87-8		0.02–0.1					186.5														
HCFC	R-226ea	1-chloro-1,1,2,3,3,3-hexafluoropropane	C_{3}HF_{6}Cl	359-58-0		0.02–0.1					186.5														
HFC	R-227ca	1,1,2,2,3,3,3-heptafluoropropane	C_{3}HF_{7}	2252-84-8		0					170														
HFC	R-227ca2	trifluoromethyl 1,1,2,2-tetrafluoroethyl ether	C_{3}HF_{7}O	2356-61-8		0					186														
HFC	R-227ea	1,1,1,2,3,3,3-heptafluoropropane	C_{3}HF_{7}	431-89-0	34.2	0	3,350	1,000 A1	84,000	580	170	−16.4	102.8	2,980											
HFC	R-227me	trifluoromethyl 1,2,2,2-tetrafluoroethyl ether	C_{3}HF_{7}O	2356-62-9	11	0	1,540				186														
HCFC	R-231	pentachlorofluoropropane	C_{3}H_{2}FCl_{5}	134190-48-0		0.05–0.09					234.3														
HCFC	R-232	tetrachlorodifluoropropane	C_{3}H_{2}F_{2}Cl_{4}	134237-39-1		0.008–0.1					217.9														
HCFC	R-232ca	1,1,3,3-tetrachloro-2,2-difluoropropane	C_{3}H_{2}F_{2}Cl_{4}	1112-14-7		0.008–0.1					217.9														
HCFC	R-232cb	1,1,1,3-tetrachloro-2,2-difluoropropane	C_{3}H_{2}F_{2}Cl_{4}	677-54-3		0.008–0.1					217.9														
HCFC	R-233	trichlorotrifluoropropane	C_{3}H_{2}F_{3}Cl_{3}	134237-40-4		0.007–0.23					201.4														
HCFC	R-233ca	1,1,3-trichloro-2,2,3-trifluoropropane	C_{3}H_{2}F_{3}Cl_{3}	131221-36-8		0.007–0.23					201.4														
HCFC	R-233cb	1,1,3-trichloro-1,2,2-trifluoropropane	C_{3}H_{2}F_{3}Cl_{3}	421-99-8		0.007–0.23					201.4														
HCFC	R-233cc	1,1,1-trichloro-2,2,3-trifluoropropane	C_{3}H_{2}F_{3}Cl_{3}	131211-71-7		0.007–0.23					201.4														
HCFC	R-234	dichlorotetrafluoropropane	C_{3}H_{2}F_{4}Cl_{2}	127564-83-4		0.01–0.28					184.9														
HCFC	R-234aa	2,2-dichloro-1,1,3,3-tetrafluoropropane	C_{3}H_{2}F_{4}Cl_{2}	17705-30-5		0.01–0.28					184.9														
HCFC	R-234ab	2,2-dichloro-1,1,1,3-tetrafluoropropane	C_{3}H_{2}F_{4}Cl_{2}	149329-24-8		0.01–0.28					184.9														
HCFC	R-234ba	1,2-dichloro-1,2,3,3-tetrafluoropropane	C_{3}H_{2}F_{4}Cl_{2}	425-94-5		0.01–0.28					184.9														
HCFC	R-234bb	2,3-dichloro-1,1,1,2-tetrafluoropropane	C_{3}H_{2}F_{4}Cl_{2}	149329-25-9		0.01–0.28					184.9														
HCFC	R-234bc	1,2-dichloro-1,1,2,3-tetrafluoropropane	C_{3}H_{2}F_{4}Cl_{2}	149329-26-0		0.01–0.28					184.9														
HCFC	R-234ca	1,3-dichloro-1,2,2,3-tetrafluoropropane	C_{3}H_{2}F_{4}Cl_{2}	70341-81-0		0.01–0.28					184.9														
HCFC	R-234cb	1,1-dichloro-2,2,3,3-tetrafluoropropane	C_{3}H_{2}F_{4}Cl_{2}	4071-01-6		0.01–0.28					184.9														
HCFC	R-234cc	1,3-dichloro-1,1,2,2-tetrafluoropropane	C_{3}H_{2}F_{4}Cl_{2}	422-00-4		0.01–0.28					184.9														
HCFC	R-234cd	1,1-dichloro-1,2,2,3-tetrafluoropropane	C_{3}H_{2}F_{4}Cl_{2}	70192-63-1		0.01–0.28					184.9														
HCFC	R-234da	2,3-dichloro-1,1,1,3-tetrafluoropropane	C_{3}H_{2}F_{4}Cl_{2}	146916-90-7		0.01–0.28					184.9														
HCFC	R-234fa	1,3-dichloro-1,1,3,3-tetrafluoropropane	C_{3}H_{2}F_{4}Cl_{2}	76140-39-1		0.01–0.28					184.9														
HCFC	R-234fb	1,1-dichloro-1,3,3,3-tetrafluoropropane	C_{3}H_{2}F_{4}Cl_{2}	64712-27-2		0.01–0.28					184.9														
HCFC	R-235	chloropentafluoropropane	C_{3}H_{2}F_{5}Cl	134237-41-5		0.03–0.52					168.5														
HCFC	R-235ca	1-chloro-1,2,2,3,3-pentafluoropropane	C_{3}H_{2}F_{5}Cl	28103-66-4		0.03–0.52					168.5														
HCFC	R-235cb	3-chloro-1,1,1,2,3-pentafluoropropane	C_{3}H_{2}F_{5}Cl	422-02-6		0.03–0.52					168.5														
HCFC	R-235cc	1-chloro-1,1,2,2,3-pentafluoropropane	C_{3}H_{2}F_{5}Cl	679-99-2		0.03–0.52					168.5														
HCFC	R-235da	2-chloro-1,1,1,3,3-pentafluoropropane	C_{3}H_{2}F_{5}Cl	134251-06-2		0.03–0.52					168.5														
HCFC	R-235fa	1-chloro-1,1,3,3,3-pentafluoropropane	C_{3}H_{2}F_{5}Cl	677-55-4		0.03–0.52					168.5														
HFC	R-236cb	1,1,1,2,2,3-hexafluoropropane	C_{3}H_{2}F_{6}	677-56-5	13.6	0	1,210				152	−1.5													
HFC	R-236ea	1,1,1,2,3,3-hexafluoropropane	C_{3}H_{2}F_{6}	431-63-0	10.7	0	1,330				152		139.29	3,502											
HFC	R-236fa	1,1,1,3,3,3-hexafluoropropane	C_{3}H_{2}F_{6}	690-39-1	240	0	8,060	1,000 A1	55,000	340	152	−1.05±.35	124.92	3,200											
HFC	R-236me	1,2,2,2-tetrafluoroethyl difluoromethyl ether	C_{3}H_{2}F_{6}O	57041-67-5	5.8	0	989				168														
HCFC	R-241	tetrachlorofluoropropane	C_{3}H_{3}FCl_{4}	134190-49-1		0.004–0.09					199.9														
HCFC	R-242	trichlorodifluoropropane	C_{3}H_{3}F_{2}Cl_{3}	134237-42-6		0.005–0.13					183.4														
HCFC	R-243	dichlorotrifluoropropane	C_{3}H_{3}F_{3}Cl_{2}	134237-43-7		0.007–0.12					167														
HCFC	R-243ca	1,3-dichloro-1,2,2-trifluoropropane	C_{3}H_{3}F_{3}Cl_{2}	67406-68-2		0.007–0.12					167														
HCFC	R-243cb	1,1-dichloro-2,2,3-trifluoropropane	C_{3}H_{3}F_{3}Cl_{2}	70192-70-0		0.007–0.12					167														
HCFC	R-243cc	1,1-dichloro-1,2,2-trifluoropropane	C_{3}H_{3}F_{3}Cl_{2}	7125-99-7		0.007–0.12					167														
HCFC	R-243da	2,3-dichloro-1,1,1-trifluoropropane	C_{3}H_{3}F_{3}Cl_{2}	338-75-0		0.007–0.12					167														
HCFC	R-243ea	1,3-dichloro-1,2,3-trifluoropropane	C_{3}H_{3}F_{3}Cl_{2}	151771-08-3		0.007–0.12					167														
HCFC	R-243ec	1,3-dichloro-1,1,2-trifluoropropane	C_{3}H_{3}F_{3}Cl_{2}	149329-27-1		0.007–0.12					167														
HCFC	R-244	chlorotetrafluoropropane	C_{3}H_{3}F_{4}Cl	134190-50-4		0.009–0.14					150.5														
HCFC	R-244ba	2-chloro-1,2,3,3-tetrafluoropropane	C_{3}H_{3}F_{4}Cl	149329-28-2		0.009–0.14					150.5														
HCFC	R-244bb	2-chloro-1,1,1,2-tetrafluoropropane	C_{3}H_{3}F_{4}Cl	421-73-8		0.009–0.14					150.5														
HCFC	R-244ca	3-chloro-1,1,2,2-tetrafluoropropane	C_{3}H_{3}F_{4}Cl	679-85-6		0.009–0.14					150.5														
HCFC	R-244cb	1-chloro-1,2,2,3-tetrafluoropropane	C_{3}H_{3}F_{4}Cl	67406-66-0		0.009–0.14					150.5														
HCFC	R-244cc	1-chloro-1,1,2,2-tetrafluoropropane	C_{3}H_{3}F_{4}Cl	421-75-0		0.009–0.14					150.5														
HCFC	R-244da	2-chloro-1,1,3,3-tetrafluoropropane	C_{3}H_{3}F_{4}Cl	19041-02-2		0.009–0.14					150.5														
HCFC	R-244db	2-chloro-1,1,1,3-tetrafluoropropane	C_{3}H_{3}F_{4}Cl	117970-90-8		0.009–0.14					150.5														
HCFC	R-244ea	3-chloro-1,1,2,3-tetrafluoropropane	C_{3}H_{3}F_{4}Cl			0.009–0.14					150.5														
HCFC	R-244eb	3-chloro-1,1,1,2-tetrafluoropropane	C_{3}H_{3}F_{4}Cl	151771-09-4		0.009–0.14					150.5														
HCFC	R-244ec	1-chloro-1,1,2,3-tetrafluoropropane	C_{3}H_{3}F_{4}Cl	149448-09-9		0.009–0.14					150.5														
HCFC	R-244fa	3-chloro-1,1,1,3-tetrafluoropropane	C_{3}H_{3}F_{4}Cl	149329-29-3		0.009–0.14					150.5														
HCFC	R-244fb	1-chloro-1,1,3,3-tetrafluoropropane	C_{3}H_{3}F_{4}Cl	2730-64-5		0.009–0.14					150.5														
HFC	R-245ca	1,1,2,2,3-pentafluoropropane	C_{3}H_{3}F_{5}	679-86-7	6.2	0	716				134		174.42	3,925											
HFC	R-245cb	pentafluoropropane	C_{3}H_{3}F_{5}	1814-88-6		0					134														
HFC	R-245ea	1,1,2,3,3-pentafluoropropane	C_{3}H_{3}F_{5}	24270-66-4		0					134														
HFC	R-245eb	1,1,1,2,3-pentafluoropropane	C_{3}H_{3}F_{5}	431-31-2		0					134														
HFC	R-245fa	1,1,1,3,3-pentafluoropropane	C_{3}H_{3}F_{5}	460-73-1	7.6	0	858	300 B1	34,000	190	134	15	154.05	3,640											
HFC	R-245mc	methyl pentafluoroethyl ether	C_{3}H_{3}F_{5}O	22410-44-2		0					150														
HFC	R-245mf	difluoromethyl 2,2,2-trifluoroethyl ether	C_{3}H_{3}F_{5}O	1885-48-9	2.2	0	286				150														
HFC	R-245qc	difluoromethyl 1,1,2-trifluoroethyl ether	C_{3}H_{3}F_{5}O	69948-24-9		0					150														
HCFC	R-251	trichlorofluoropropane	C_{3}H_{4}FCl_{3}	134190-51-5		0.001–0.01					165.4														
HCFC	R-252	dichlorodifluoropropane	C_{3}H_{4}F_{2}Cl_{2}	134190-52-6		0.005–0.04					149														
HCFC	R-252ca	1,3-dichloro-2,2-difluoropropane	C_{3}H_{4}F_{2}Cl_{2}	1112-36-3		0.005–0.04					149														
HCFC	R-252cb	1,1-dichloro-2,2-difluoropropane	C_{3}H_{4}F_{2}Cl_{2}	1112-01-2		0.005–0.04					149														
HCFC	R-252dc	1,2-dichloro-1,1-difluoropropane	C_{3}H_{4}F_{2}Cl_{2}	7126-15-0		0.005–0.04					149														
HCFC	R-252ec	1,1-dichloro-1,2-difluoropropane	C_{3}H_{4}F_{2}Cl_{2}	151771-10-7		0.005–0.04					149														
HCFC	R-253	chlorotrifluoropropane	C_{3}H_{4}F_{3}Cl	134237-44-8		0.003–0.03					132.5														
HCFC	R-253ba	2-chloro-1,2,3-trifluoropropane	C_{3}H_{4}F_{3}Cl	151771-11-8		0.003–0.03					132.5														
HCFC	R-253bb	2-chloro-1,1,2-trifluoropropane	C_{3}H_{4}F_{3}Cl	69202-10-4		0.003–0.03					132.5														
HCFC	R-253ca	1-chloro-2,2,3-trifluoropropane	C_{3}H_{4}F_{3}Cl	56758-54-4		0.003–0.03					132.5														
HCFC	R-253cb	1-chloro-1,2,2-trifluoropropane	C_{3}H_{4}F_{3}Cl	70192-76-6		0.003–0.03					132.5														
HCFC	R-253ea	3-chloro-1,1,2-trifluoropropane	C_{3}H_{4}F_{3}Cl	121612-65-5		0.003–0.03					132.5														
HCFC	R-253eb	1-chloro-1,2,3-trifluoropropane	C_{3}H_{4}F_{3}Cl	151771-12-9		0.003–0.03					132.5														
HCFC	R-253ec	1-chloro-1,1,2-trifluoropropane	C_{3}H_{4}F_{3}Cl	134251-05-1		0.003–0.03					132.5														
HCFC	R-253fa	3-chloro-1,3,3-trifluoropropane	C_{3}H_{4}F_{3}Cl			0.003–0.03					132.5														
HCFC	R-253fb	3-chloro-1,1,1-trifluoropropane	C_{3}H_{4}F_{3}Cl	460-35-5		0.003–0.03					132.5														
HCFC	R-253fc	1-chloro-1,1,3-trifluoropropane	C_{3}H_{4}F_{3}Cl	83124-56-5		0.003–0.03					132.5														
HFC	R-254cb	1,1,2,2-tetrafluoropropane	C_{3}H_{4}F_{4}	40723-63-5		0					116.1														
HFC	R-254pc	methyl 1,1,2,2-tetrafluoroethyl ether	C_{3}H_{4}F_{4}O	425-88-7	2.6	0	359				132.1														
HCFC	R-261	dichlorofluoropropane	C_{3}H_{5}FCl_{2}	134237-45-9		0.002–0.02					131														
HCFC	R-261ba	1,2-dichloro-2-fluoropropane	C_{3}H_{5}FCl_{2}	420-97-3		0.002–0.02					131														
HCFC	R-262	chlorodifluoropropane	C_{3}H_{5}F_{2}Cl	134190-53-7		0.002–0.02					114.5														
HCFC	R-262ca	1-chloro-2,2-difluoropropane	C_{3}H_{5}F_{2}Cl	420-99-5		0.002–0.02					114.5														
HCFC	R-262fa	3-chloro-1,1-difluoropropane	C_{3}H_{5}F_{2}Cl	83124-57-6		0.002–0.02					114.5														
HCFC	R-262fb	1-chloro-1,3-difluoropropane	C_{3}H_{5}F_{2}Cl	151771-13-0		0.002–0.02					114.5														
HFC	R-263	trifluoropropane	C_{3}H_{5}F_{3}	94458-05-6		0					98.1														
HCFC	R-271	chlorofluoropropane	C_{3}H_{6}FCl	134190-54-8		0.001–0.03					96.5														
HCFC	R-271b	2-chloro-2-fluoropropane	C_{3}H_{6}FCl	420-44-0		0.001–0.03					96.5														
HCFC	R-271d	2-chloro-1-fluoropropane	C_{3}H_{6}FCl	20372-78-5		0.001–0.03					96.5														
HCFC	R-271fb	1-chloro-1-fluoropropane	C_{3}H_{6}FCl	430-55-7		0.001–0.03					96.5														
HFC	R-272	difluoropropane	C_{3}H_{6}F_{2}	94458-04-5		0					80.1														
HFC	R-281	fluoropropane	C_{3}H_{7}F	106857-11-8		0					62.1														
HC	R-290	propane	C_{3}H_{8} or CH_{3}CH_{2}CH_{3}	74-98-6	13 days	< 0(smog)	3.3–9.5	1,000 A3	5,300	9.5	44.1	−42.1±.2	96.7	4,248											
CFC	R-C316	dichlorohexafluorocyclobutane	C_{4}Cl_{2}F_{6}	356-18-3	74.6 ± 3(E),114.1 ± 10 (Z)	0.40(E), 0.49(Z)	4,160(E), 5,400(Z)				232.9														
CFC	R-C317	chloroheptafluorocyclobutane	C_{4}ClF_{7}	377-41-3							216.5														
PFC	R-C318	octafluorocyclobutane (perfluorocyclobutane)	C_{4}F_{8} or -(CF_{2})_{4}-	115-25-3	3,200	0	10,300	1,000 A1	69,000	570	200	−6	115.23	2,777											
PFC	R-3-1-10	decafluorobutane (perfluorobutane)	C_{4}F_{10}	355-25-9	2,600	0	8,860				238	−1.7													
HFC	R-329ccb	1,1,1,2,2,3,3,4,4-nonafluorobutane	C_{4}HF_{9}	375-17-7		0					220														
HFC	R-338eea	1,1,1,2,3,4,4,4-octafluorobutane	C_{4}H_{2}F_{8}	75995-72-1		0					202														
HFC	R-347ccd	1,1,1,2,2,3,3-heptafluorobutane	C_{4}H_{3}F_{7}	662-00-0		0					184.1														
HFC	R-347mcc	perfluoropropyl methyl ether	C_{4}H_{3}F_{7}O	375-03-1	5.2	0	575				200.1														
HFC	R-347mmy	perfluoroisopropyl methyl ether	C_{4}H_{3}F_{7}O	22052-84-2	3.4	0	343				200.1														
HFC	R-365mfc	1,1,1,3,3-pentafluorobutane	C_{4}H_{5}F_{5}	406-58-6	8.6	0	804				148.1														
PFC	R-4-1-12	dodecafluoropentane (perfluoropentane)	C_{5}F_{12}	678-26-2	4,100	0	9,160				288														
PFC	R-5-1-14	tetradecafluorohexane (perfluorohexane)	C_{6}F_{14}	355-42-0	3,200	0	9,300				338	56													
CFC	R-400	R-12/114(50/50 wt%) OR (60/40)(must be specified)	50% CCl_{2}F_{2} · 50% C_{2}F_{4}Cl_{2} OR; 60% CCl_{2}F_{2} · 40% C_{2}F_{4}Cl_{2}		200 (Note: Blend calculation using the following information: (a) hydrocarbons are assumed to be similar to methane in terms of atmospheric lifetime being 12 ± 3 years, (b) pentane & isopentane is assumed to have a net GWP over 100-yr to be 4 ± 2) OR; 180	1.0 (Note: Blend calculation using the following information:)	10,450; 10,540	1,000 A1; 1000 A1	28000; 30000	160; 170	141.6; 136.9														
HCFC	R-401A	R-22/152a/124 (53±2/13+.5,-1.5/34±1)	53±2% CHClF_{2} · 13+.5,-1.5% C_{2}H_{4}F_{2} · 34±1% C_{2}HF_{4}Cl	MP-39	8.514	0.03398	1,182	1,000 A1	27,000	110	94.4	−34.4/−28.8	105.27	4,613											
HCFC	R-401B	R-22/152a/124 (61±2/11+.5,-1.5/28±1)	61±2% CHClF_{2} · 11+.5,-1.5% C_{2}H_{4}F_{2} · 28±1% C_{2}HF_{4}Cl	MP-66	9.098	0.03666	1,288	1,000 A1	30,000	120	92.8	−35.7/−30.8	103.54	4,682											
HCFC	R-401C	R-22/152a/124 (33±2/15+.5,-1.5/52±1)	33±2% CHClF_{2} · 15+.5,-1.5% C_{2}H_{4}F_{2} · 52±1% C_{2}HF_{4}Cl	MP-52	7.186	0.02794	933	1,000 A1	20,000	84	101	−30.5/−23.8													
HCFC	R-402A	R-125/290/22 (60±2/2±1/38±2)	60±2% C_{2}HF_{5} · 2±1% C_{3}H_{8} · 38±2% CHClF_{2}	HP-80	22.2?	0.019	2,788	1,000 A1	33,000	140	101.5	−49.2/−47.0	76.03	4,234											
HCFC	R-402B	R-125/290/22 (38±2/2±1/60±2)	38±2% C_{2}HF_{5} · 2±1% C_{3}H_{8} · 60±2% CHClF_{2}	HP-81	18.46?	0.03	2,416	1,000 A1	63,000	240	94.7	−47.2/−44.9	83.03	4,525											
HCFC	R-403A	R-290/22/218 (5+.2,-2/75±2/20±0)	5+.2,-2% C_{3}H_{8} · 75±2% CHClF_{2} · 20±0% C_{3}F_{8}	ISCEON 69-S	529.6?	0.0375	3,124	1,000 A2	33,000	120	92	−44.0/−42.3	91.22	4,688											
HCFC	R-403B	R-290/22/218 (5+.2,-2/56±2/39±0)	5+.2,-2% C_{3}H_{8} · 56±2% CHClF_{2} · 39±0% C_{3}F_{8}	ISCEON 69-L	1,021.32?	0.028	4,457	1,000 A1	70,000	290	103.3	−43.8/−42.3	88.72	4,399											
HFC	R-404A	R-125/143a/134a (44±2/52±1/4±2)	44±2% C_{2}HF_{5} · 52±1% C_{2}H_{3}F_{3} · 4±2% C_{2}H_{2}F_{4}	HP-62, FX-70	40.36	0	3,922	1,000 A1	130,000	500	97.6	−46.6/−45.8	72.14	3,735											
HCFC	R-405A	R-22/152a/142b/C318 (45±0/7±1/5.5±1/42.5±2)	45±0% CHClF_{2} · 7±1% C_{2}H_{4}F_{2} · 5.5±1% C_{2}H_{3}F_{2}Cl · 42.5±2% C_{4}F_{8}	GREENCOOL G2015	1,366.4825	0.02635	5,328	1,000 A1?	57,000	260	111.9	−32.9/−24.5	106	4,289											
HCFC	R-406A	R-22/600a/142b (55±2/4±1/41±0)	55±2% CHClF_{2} · 4±1% C_{4}H_{10} · 41±0% C_{2}H_{3}F_{2}Cl	GHG	14.419?	0.0562	1,943	1,000 A2	21,000	25	89.9	−32.7/−23.5	116.5	4,881											
HCFC	R-406B	R-22/600a/142b (65±2/4±1/31±0)	65±2% CHClF_{2} · 4±1% C_{4}H_{10} · 31±0% C_{2}H_{3}F_{2}Cl	GHG-HP	13.829?	0.0542	1,893	1,000? A2?	21,000?	25?	88.6														
HFC	R-407A	R-32/125/134a (20±2/40±2/40±2)	20±2% CH_{2}F_{2} · 40±2% C_{2}HF_{5} · 40±2% C_{2}H_{2}F_{4}	Klea 60	18.18	0	2,107	1,000 A1	83,000	300	90.1	−45.2/−38.7	81.91	4,487											
HFC	R-407B	R-32/125/134a (10±2/70±2/20±2)	10±2% CH_{2}F_{2} · 70±2% C_{2}HF_{5} · 20±2% C_{2}H_{2}F_{4}	Klea 61	23.59	0	2,804	1,000 A1	79,000	330	102.9	−46.8/−42.4	74.38	4,083											
HFC	R-407C	R-32/125/134a (23±2/25±2/52±2)	23±2% CH_{2}F_{2} · 25±2% C_{2}HF_{5} · 52±2% C_{2}H_{2}F_{4}	Klea 66, AC9000	15.657	0	1,774	1,000 A1	81,000	290	86.2	−43.8/−36.7	86.05	4,634											
HFC	R-407D	R-32/125/134a (15±2/15±2/70±2)	15±2% CH_{2}F_{2} · 15±2% C_{2}HF_{5} · 70±2% C_{2}H_{2}F_{4}		14.885	0	1,627	1,000 A1	68,000	250	91	−39.4/−32.7	91.57	4,483											
HFC	R-407E	R-32/125/134a (25±2/15±2/60±2)	25±2% CH_{2}F_{2} · 15±2% C_{2}HF_{5} · 60±2% C_{2}H_{2}F_{4}		13.975	0	1,552	1,000 A1	80,000	280	83.8	−42.8/−35.6	88.77	4,734											
HFC	R-407F	R-32/125/134a (30±2/30±2/40±2)	30±2% CH_{2}F_{2} · 30±2% C_{2}HF_{5} · 40±2% C_{2}H_{2}F_{4}	Genetron Performax LT	15.77	0	1,825	1,000 A1	95,000	320	82.1	−46.1/−39.7													
HCFC	R-408A	R-125/143a/22 (7±2/46±1/47±2)	7±2% C_{2}HF_{5} · 46±1% C_{2}H_{3}F_{3} · 47±2% CHClF_{2}	FX-10	31.59	0.0235	3,152	1,000 A1	95,000	340	87	−45.5/−45.0	83.5	4,340											
HCFC	R-409A	R-22/124/142b (60±2/25±2/15±1)	60±2% CHClF_{2} · 25±2% C_{2}HF_{4}Cl · 15±1% C_{2}H_{3}F_{2}Cl	FX-56	11.335	0.046	1,585	1,000 A1	29,000	110	97.4	−35.4/−27.5	106.92	4,600											
HCFC	R-409B	R-22/124/142b (65±2/25±2/10±1)	65±2% CHClF_{2} · 25±2% C_{2}HF_{4}Cl · 10±1% C_{2}H_{3}F_{2}Cl	FX-57	11.04	0.045	1,560	1,000 A1	30,000	120	96.7	−36.5/−29.7	104.36	4,711											
HFC	R-410A	R-32/125 (50+0.5,–1.5/50+1.5,–0.5)	50+0.5,–1.5% CH_{2}F_{2} · 50+1.5,–.5% CHF_{2}CF_{3}	AZ-20, Puron, Suva 9100	16.95	0	2,088	1,000 A1	140,000	420	72.6	−51.6/−51.5	70.17	4,770											
HFC	R-410B	R-32/125 (45±1/55±1)	45±1% CH_{2}F_{2} · 55±1% CHF_{2}CF_{3}	AC9100	18.155	0	2,229	1,000? A1	140,000	430	75.6	−51.5/−51.4													
HCFO	R-411A	R-1270/22/152a (1.5+0,–1/87.5+2,–0/11+0,–1)	1.5+0,–1% C_{3}H_{6} · 87.5+2,–0% CHClF_{2} · 11+0,–1% C_{2}H_{4}F_{2}	GREENCOOL G2018a	10.834	0.04375	1,597	990 A2	14,000	46	82.4	−39.7/−37.2	99.06	4,954											
HCFO	R-411B	R-1270/22/152a (3+0,–1/94+2,–0/3+0,–1)	3+0,–1% C_{3}H_{6} · 94+2,–0% CHClF_{2} · 3+0,–1% C_{2}H_{4}F_{2}	GREENCOOL G2018b	11.682	0.047	1,705	980 A2	13,000	45	83.1	−41.6/−41.3	95.95	4,947											
HCFO	R-411C	R-1270/22/152a (3+0,–1/95.5+2,–0/1.5+0,–1)	3+0,–1% C_{3}H_{6} · 95.5+2,–0% CHClF_{2} · 1.5+0,–1% C_{2}H_{4}F_{2}	GREENCOOL G2018c	11.841	0.04775	1,730	970? A2?	12,000?	44?	83.4		95.5	4,950											
HCFC	R-412A	R-22/218/142b (70±2/5±2/25±1)	70±2% CHClF_{2} · 5±2% C_{3}F_{8} · 25±1% C_{2}H_{3}F_{2}Cl	Arcton TP5R	142.875	0.0525	2,286	1,000 A2	22,000	82	92.2	−36.4/−28.8	107.5	4,881											
HFC	R-413A	R-218/134a/600a (9±1/88±2/3+0,–1)	9±1% C_{3}F_{8} · 88±2% C_{2}H_{2}F_{4} · 3+0,–1% C_{4}H_{10}	ISCEON 49	246.68?	0	2,053	1,000 A2	22,000	94	104	−29.3/−27.6	101.39	4,240											
HCFC	R-414A	R-22/124/600a/142b (51±2/28.5±2/4±.5/16.5+0.5,–1)	51±2% CHClF_{2} · 28.5±2% C_{2}HF_{4}Cl · 4±.5% C_{4}H_{10} · 16.5+0.5,–1% C_{2}H_{3}F_{2}Cl	GHG-X4, Autofrost, Chill-It	11.2065?	0.04332	1,478	1,000 A1	26,000	100	96.9	−34.0/−25.8	110.72	4,702											
HCFC	R-414B	R-22/124/600a/142b (50±2/39±2/1.5±0.5/9.5+0.5,–1)	50±2% CHClF_{2} · 39±2% C_{2}HF_{4}Cl · 1.5±.5% C_{4}H_{10} · 9.5+0.5,–1% C_{2}H_{3}F_{2}Cl	Hot Shot, Kar Kool	10.1425?	0.04023	1,362	1,000 A1	23,000	95	101.5	−34.4/−26.1	108	4,592											
HCFC	R-415A	R-22/152a (82±1/18±1)	82±1% CHClF_{2} · 18±1% C_{2}H_{4}F_{2}		10.092	0.041	1,507	1,000 A2	57,000	190	81.9	−37.5/−34.7													
HCFC	R-415B	R-22/152a (25±1/75±1)	25±1% CHClF_{2} · 75±1% C_{2}H_{4}F_{2}		4.05	0.0125	546	1,000 A2	52,000	120	70.2	−23.4/−21.8													
HCFC	R-416A	R-134a/124/600 (59+0.5,–1/39.5+1,–0.5/1.5+1,–0.2)	59+0.5,-1% C_{2}H_{2}F_{4} · 39.5+1,–.5% C_{2}HF_{4}Cl · 1.5+1,–.2% C_{4}H_{10}	FRIGC (FR-12)	10.731?	0.00869	1,084	1,000 A1	14,000	62	111.9	−38.0/−32.9	108.22	4,020											
HFC	R-417A	R-125/134a/600 (46.6±1.1/50±1/3.4+0.1,–0.4)	46.6±1.1% C_{2}HF_{5} · 50±1% C_{2}H_{2}F_{4} · 3.4+0.1,–.4% C_{4}H_{10}	ISCEON 59, NU-22	20.922?	0	2,346	1,000 A1	13,000	56	106.7	−41.2/−40.1	89.89	4,102											
HFC	R-417B	R-125/134a/600 (79±1/18.3±1/2.7+0.1,–0.5)	79±1% C_{2}HF_{5} · 18.3±1% C_{2}H_{2}F_{4} · 2.7+0.1,–0.5% C_{4}H_{10}		25.796?	0	3,027	1,000 A1	15,000	70	113.1	−44.9/−41.5													
HCFC	R-418A	R-290/22/152a (1.5±.5/96±1/2.5±.5)	1.5±.5% C_{3}H_{8} · 96±1% CHClF_{2} · 2.5±.5% C_{2}H_{4}F_{2}		11.735?	0.048	1,741	1,000 A2	59,000	200	84.6	−42.6/−36.0													
HFC	R-419A	R-125/134a/E170 (77±1/19±1/4±1)	77±1% C_{2}HF_{5} · 19±1% C_{2}H_{2}F_{4} · 4±1% C_{2}H_{6}O		24.9906	0	2,967	1,000 A2	70,000	310	109.3	−25.0/−24.2													
HCFC	R-420A	R-134a/142b (88+1,–0/12+0,–1)	88+1,–0% C_{2}H_{2}F_{4} · 12+0,–1% C_{2}H_{3}F_{2}Cl	Choice Refrigerant	14.468	0.0084	1,548	1,000 A1	45,000	190	101.8	−34.4/−28.8													
HFC	R-421A	R-125/134a (58±1/42±1)	58±1% C_{2}HF_{5} · 42±1% C_{2}H_{2}F_{4}	Choice R421A	22.7	0	2,631	1,000 A1	61,000	280	111.7														
HFC	R-421B	R-125/134a (85±1/15±1)	85±1% C_{2}HF_{5} · 15±1% C_{2}H_{2}F_{4}	Choice 421B	26.75	0	3,190	1,000 A1	69,000	330	116.9														
HFC	R-422A	R-125/134a/600a (85.1±1/11.5±1/3.4+0.1,–0.4)	85.1±1% C_{2}HF_{5} · 11.5±1% C_{2}H_{2}F_{4} · 3.4+0.1,–0.4% C_{4}H_{10}	ISCEON 79	26.697?	0	3,143	1,000 A1	63,000	290	113.6														
HFC	R-422B (NU-22B)	R-125/134a/600a (55±1/42±1/3+0.1,–0.5)	55±1% C_{2}HF_{5} · 42±1% C_{2}H_{2}F_{4} · 3+0.1,–0.5% C_{4}H_{10}	ICOR XAC1	22.19?	0	2,526	1,000 A1	56,000	250	108.5														
HFC	R-422C	R-125/134a/600a (82±1/15±1/3+.1,–.5)	82±1% C_{2}HF_{5} · 15±1% C_{2}H_{2}F_{4} · 3+.1,–.5% C_{4}H_{10}	ICOR XLT1	26.24?	0	3,085	1,000 A1	62,000	290	113.4														
HFC	R-422D	R-125/134a/600a (65.1+0.9,–1.1/31.5±1/3.4+0.1,–.4)	65.1+0.9,–1.1% C_{2}HF_{5} · 31.5±1% C_{2}H_{2}F_{4} · 3.4+.1,–.4% C_{4}H_{10}	ISCEON MO29	23.697?	0	2,729	1,000 A1	58,000	260	109.9														
HFC	R-423A	R-134a/227ea (52.5±1/47.5±1)	52.5±1% C_{2}H_{2}F_{4} · 47.5±1% C_{3}HF_{7}		23.595	0	2,280	1,000 A1	59,000	310	126														
HFC	R-424A	R-125/134a/600a/600/601a (50.5±1/47±1/0.9+.1,–0.2/1+0.1,+0.2/.6+0.1,–0.2)	50.5±1% C_{2}HF_{5} · 47±1% C_{2}H_{2}F_{4} · 1.9+0.3,–0.1% C_{4}H_{10} · 0.6+0.1,–0.2% C_{5}H_{12}	RS-44 (new comp.)	21.525?	0	2,440?	970 A1	23,000	100	108.4														
HFC	R-425A	R-32/134a/227ea (18.5±.5/69.5±.5/12±.5)	18.5±.5% CH_{2}F_{2} · 69.5±.5% C_{2}H_{2}F_{4} · 12±.5% C_{3}HF_{7}		14.7405	0	1,505	1,000 A1	72,000	260	90.3														
HFC	R-426A	R-125/134a/600/601a (5.1±1/93±1/1.3+0.1,–0.2/0.6+0.1,–0.2)	5.1±1% C_{2}HF_{5} · 93±1% C_{2}H_{2}F_{4} · 1.3+.01,–0.2% C_{4}H_{10} · 0.6+0.1,–.2% C_{5}H_{12}	RS-24 (new comp.)	14.727?	0	1,508?	990 A1	20,000	83	101.6														
HFC	R-427A	R-32/125/143a/134a (15±2/25±2/10±2/50±2)	15±2% CH_{2}F_{2} · 25±2% C_{2}HF_{5} · 10±2% C_{2}H_{3}F_{3} · 50±2% C_{2}H_{2}F_{4}	Forane 427A	20.185	0	2,138	1,000 A1	79,000	290	90.4														
HFC	R-428A	R-125/143a/290/600a (77.5±1/20±1/.6+.1,–.2/1.9+.1,–.2)	77.5±1% C_{2}HF_{5} · 20±1% C_{2}H_{3}F_{3} · .6+.1,–.2% C_{3}H_{8} · 1.9+.1,–.2% C_{4}H_{10}	RS-52	33.175?	<0(smog)	3,607	1,000 A1	83,000	370	107.5														
HFC	R-429A	R-E170/152a/600a (60±1/10±1/30±1)	60±1% C_{2}H_{6}O · 10±1% C_{2}H_{4}F_{2} · 30±1% C_{4}H_{10}		3.749?	<0(smog)	13.9	1,000 A3	6,300	13	50.8														
HFC	R-430A	R-152a/600a (76±1/24±1)	76±1% C_{2}H_{4}F_{2} · 24±1% C_{4}H_{10}		3.944?	0	95	1,000 A3	8,000	21	64														
HFC	R-431A	R-290/152a (71±1/29±1)	71±1% C_{3}H_{8} · 29±1% C_{2}H_{4}F_{2}		8.926?	<0(smog)	38.3	1,000 A3	5,500	11	48.8														
HO	R-432A	R-1270/E170 (80±1/20±1)	80±1% C_{3}H_{6} · 20±1% C_{2}H_{6}O		9.603?	<0(smog)	1.64	710 A3	1,200	2.1	42.8														
HO	R-433A	R-1270/290 (30±1/70±1)	30±1% C_{3}H_{6} · 70±1% C_{3}H_{8}		12 ± 3	< 0(smog)	2.85	880 A3	3,100	5.5	43.5	−44.6/−44.2?													
HO	R-433B	R-1270/290 (5±1/95±1)	5±1% C_{3}H_{6} · 95±1% C_{3}H_{8}		12 ± 3	< 0(smog)	3.23	950 A3	4,500	8.1	44	−42.7/−42.5													
HO	R-433C	R-1270/290 (25±1/75±1)	25±1% C_{3}H_{6} · 75±1% C_{3}H_{8}		12 ± 3	< 0(smog)	2.93	790 A3	3,600	6.6	43.6	−44.3/−43.9													
HFC	R-434A	R-125/143a/134a/600a (63.2±1/18±1/16±1/2.8+.1,–.2)	63.2±1% C_{2}HF_{5} · 18±1% C_{2}H_{3}F_{3} · 16±1% C_{2}H_{2}F_{4} · 2.8+.1,–.2% C_{4}H_{10}	RS-45	30.264?	0	3,245	1,000 A1	73,000	320	105.7	−45.0/−42.3													
HFC	R-435A	R-E170/152a (80±1/20±1)	80±1% C_{2}H_{6}O · 20±1% C_{2}H_{4}F_{2}		0.292	<0(smog)	25.6	1,000 A3	8,500	17	49	−26.1/−25.9													
HC	R-436A	R-290/600a (56±1/44±1)	56±1% C_{3}H_{8} · 44±1% C_{4}H_{10}		12 ± 3	<0(smog)	3.17	1,000 A3	4,000	8	49.3	−34.3/−26.2													
HC	R-436B	R-290/600a (52±1/48±1)	52±1% C_{3}H_{8} · 48±1% C_{4}H_{10}		12 ± 3	<0(smog)	3.16	1,000 A3	4,000	8	49.9	−33.4/−25.0													
HFC	R-437A	R-125/134a/600/601 (19.5+.5,–1.8/78.5+1.5,–.7/1.4+.1,–.2/.6+.1,–.2)	19.5+.5,–1.8% C_{2}HF_{5} · 78.5+1.5,–.7% C_{2}H_{2}F_{4} · 1.4+.1,–.2% C_{4}H_{10} · .6+.1,–.2% C_{5}H_{12}		16.885?	0	1,805?	990 A1	19,000	81	103.7	−32.9/−29.2													
HFC	R-438A	R-32/125/134a/600/601a (8.5+.5,-1.5/45±1.5/44.2±1.5/1.7+.1,-.2/.6+.1,-.2)	8.5+.5,-1.5% CH_{2}F_{2} · 45±1.5% C_{2}HF_{5} · 44.2±1.5% C_{2}H_{2}F_{4} · 1.7+.1,-.2% C_{4}H_{10} · .6+.1,-.2% C_{5}H_{12}	KDD5, ISCEON MO99	19.9305?	0	2,265?	990 A1	20,000	79	99.1	−43.0/−36.4													
HFC	R-439A	R-32/125/600a (50±1/47±1/3±.5)	50±1% CH_{2}F_{2} · 47±1% C_{2}HF_{5} · 3±.5% C_{4}H_{10}		16.44?	0	1,983	990 A2	26,000	76	71.2	−52.0/−51.8													
HFC	R-440A	R-290/134a/152a (.6±.1/1.6±.6/97.8±.5)	.6±.1% C_{3}H_{8} · 1.6±.6% C_{2}H_{2}F_{4} · 97.8±.5% C_{2}H_{4}F_{2}		1.6652?	<0(smog)	144	1,000 A2	12,000	31	66.2	−25.5/−24.3													
HC	R-441A	R-170/290/600a/600 (3.1±.3/54.8±2/6±.6/36.1±2)	3.1±.3% C_{2}H_{6} · 54.8±2% C_{3}H_{8} · 42.1±2.6% C_{4}H_{10}	HCR-188C	12 ± 3	<0(smog)	3.6	1,000 A3	3,200	6.3	48.3	−41.9/−20.4													
HFC / HFO	R-448A	R-32/125/134a/1234ze/1234yf (26%/26%/21%/7%/20%)	26% CH_{2}F_{2} · 26% C_{2}HF_{5} · 21% C_{2}H_{2}F_{4} · 7% C_{3}H_{2}F_{4} · 20% C_{3}H_{2}F_{4}	Solistice N-40		0	1273	A1			86.3	−45.9	83.7	4,660											
HFO	R-449A	R-32/R-125/134a/1234yf (24.3%/24.7%/25.7%/25.3%)	24.3% CH_{2}F_{2} · 24.7% C_{2}HF_{5} · 25.7% C_{2}H_{2}F_{4} · 25.3% C_{3}H_{2}F_{4}	Forane 449a		0	1,282	A1			87.2	−45.9	81.5												
HFO	R-452A	R-32/R-125/1234yf (11%/59%/30%)	11% CH_{2}F_{2} · 59% C_{2}HF_{5} · 30% C_{3}H_{2}F_{4}	Opteon™️ XP44, Solstice® R452A																					
HFO	R-452B	R-32/R-125/1234yf (67.0%/7.0%/26.0%)	67.0% CH_{2}F_{2} · 7.0% C_{2}HF_{5} · 26.0% C_{3}H_{2}F_{4}	Opteon XL55, Solstice L41y		0	676	A2L			63.5	−50.9/−50.1	76.0	5,220											
HFC	R-453A	R-32/125/134a/227ea/600/601a (20%/20%/53.8%/5%/0.6%/0.6%)	20.0% CH_{2}F_{2} · 20.0% C_{2}HF_{5} · 53.8% C_{2}H_{2}F_{4} · 5.0% C_{3}HF_{7} · 0.6% C_{4}H_{10} · 0.6% C_{5}H_{12}	RS-70		0	1,765	1000 A1			88.8	−42.2	87.9	4,530											
HFO	R-454A	R-32/1234yf (35.0%/65.0%)	35.0% CH_{2}F_{2} · 65.0% C_{3}H_{2}F_{4}	Opteon XL40		0	239	A2L			80.5	−48.3	78.9												
HFO	R-454B	R-32/1234yf (68.9%/31.1%)	68.9% CH_{2}F_{2} · 31.1% C_{3}H_{2}F_{4}	Opteon XL41, Puron Advance		0	466	A2L			62.6	−50.9	77.0												
HFO	R-454C	R-32/1234yf (21.5%/78.5%)	21.5% CH_{2}F_{2} · 78.5% C_{3}H_{2}F_{4}	Opteon XL20		0	148	A2L			90.8	−45.9	82.4												
HFO	R-455A	R-1234yf/32/744 (75.5%/21.5%/3%)	21.5% CH_{2}F_{2} · 75.5% C_{3}H_{2}F_{4} · 3% CO_{2}	Solstice L40x		0	146	A2L			87.5	−52.3/−39.4	85.6	4,660											
HFO	R-456A	R-32/134a/1234ze(E) (6.0%/45.0%/49.0%)	6.0% CH_{2}F_{2} · 45.0% C_{2}H_{2}F_{4} · 49.0% C_{3}H_{2}F_{4}			0	687						102.4												
HFO	R-457A	R-32/152a/1234yf (18.0%/12.0%/70.0%)	18.0% CH_{2}F_{2} · 12.0% C_{2}H_{4}F_{2} · 70.0% C_{3}H_{2}F_{4}	Forane 457a		0	139	A2L					92.6												
HFC	R-458A	R-32/125/134a/227ea/236fa (20.5%/4.0%/61.4%/13.5%/0.6%)	20.5% CH_{2}F_{2} · 4.0% C_{2}HF_{5} · 61.4% C_{2}H_{3}F_{3} · 13.5% C_{3}HF_{7} · 0.6% C_{3}H_{2}F_{6}			0	1,650						92.0												
HFO	R-459A	R-32/1234yf(E)/1234ze(E) (68.0%/26.0%/6.0%)	68.0% CH_{2}F_{2} · 26.0% C_{3}H_{2}F_{4} · 6.0% C_{3}H_{2}F_{4}	Forane 459a		0	460																		
HFC/H	R-466A	R-32/125/13I1 (49/11.5/39.5)	49% CH_{2}F_{2} · 11.5% C_{2}HF_{5} · 39.5% CIF_{3}	Solstice N41		0	733	A1				−51.7	76.5	5144											
HCFC	R-500	R-12/152a (73.8/26.2)	73.8% CCl_{2}F_{2} · 26.2% C_{2}H_{4}F_{2}	Carrene #7	74.1668	0.738	8,077	1,000 A1	30,000	120	99.3	−33/0	102.15	4,173											
HCFC	R-501	R-22/12 (75/25)	75% CHClF_{2} · 25% CCl_{2}F_{2}		34	0.2875	4,083	1,000 A1	54,000	210	93.1	−41/−41	96.19	4,764											
HCFC	R-502	R-22/115 (48.8/51.2)	48.8% CHClF_{2} · 51.2% C_{2}F_{5}Cl		876.256	0.24968	4,657	1,000 A1	73,000	330	111.6	−45/19	80.73	4,019											
HCFC	R-503	R-23/13 (40.1/59.9)	40.1% CHF_{3} · 59.9% CClF_{3}		491.63	0.599	14,560	1,000 A1?	40,000?	200?	87.2	−88/88	18.43	4,265											
HCFC	R-504	R-32/115 (48.2/51.8)	48.2% CH_{2}F_{2} · 51.8% C_{2}F_{5}Cl		882.9618	0.22792	4,143	1,000 A1?	140,000	450	79.2	−57/17	62.13	4,439											
HCFC	R-505	R-12/31 (78/22)	78% CCl_{2}F_{2} · 22% CH_{2}FCl		78.0836+	0.7844	8,504+	350? B2?	10,000?	20?	103.5	−30/115	117.78	4,730											
HCFC	R-506	R-31/114 (55.1/44.9)	55.1% CH_{2}FCl · 44.9% C_{2}F_{4}Cl_{2}		134.90938+	0.46002	4,495+	350? B2?	10,000?	20?	93.7	−12/18	142.22	5,157											
HFC	R-507[A]	R-125/143a (50/50)	50% C_{2}HF_{5} · 50% C_{2}H_{3}F_{3}	AZ-50	40.5	0	3,985	1,000 A1	130,000	520	98.9	−46.7/−40	70.74	3,715											
HFC	R-508[A]	R-23/116 (39/61)	39% CHF_{3} · 61% C_{2}F_{6}	Klea 5R3	6,205.3	0	13,214	1,000 A1	55,000	220	100.1	−86/−86	11.01	3,701											
HFC	R-508B	R-23/116 (46/54)	46% CHF_{3} · 54% C_{2}F_{6}	Suva 95	5,524.2	0	13,396	1,000 A1	52,000	200	95.4	-88.3/−45.6	12.06	3,834											
HCFC	R-509[A]	R-22/218 (44/56)	44% CHClF_{2} · 56% C_{3}F_{8}	Arcton TP5R2	1,461.28	0.022	5,741	1,000 A1	75,000	390	124	−47/0	87.22	4,033											
HC	R-510[A]	R-E170/600a (88±.5/12±.5)	88±.5% C_{2}H_{6}O · 12±.5% C_{4}H_{10}		1.4532?	<0(smog)	1.24	1,000 A3	7,300	14	47.2	−25.2/−25.2													
HC	R-511[A]	R-290/E170 (95±1/5±1)	95±1% C_{3}H_{8} · 5±1% C_{2}H_{6}O		11.40075?	< 0(smog)	3.19	1,000 A3	5,300	9.5	44.2	−42.1/−20-40													
HFO	R-513A	R-1234yf/134a (56%/44%)	56% C_{3}H_{2}F_{4 ·}44% C_{2}H_{2}F_{4}			0	573	A1			108.4	−29.4	96.5	3,766											
HFO	R-514A	R-1336mzz-Z/trans-1,2-dichloroethene(t-DCE)(74.7%/25.3%)	74.7% C_{4}H_{2}F_{6 ·}25.3% C_{2}H_{2}CL_{2}			0	2	B1			139.6	29.1	96.5	3,520											
HFO	R-515B	R-1234ze/227ea					299																		
HC	R-600	butane	C_{4}H_{10} or CH_{3}CH_{2}CH_{2}CH_{3}	106-97-8	6.8 days	0	4.0–6.5	1,000 A3	4,000?	9.6?	58.1	0±1	152.01	3,796											
HC	R-600a	isobutane	C_{4}H_{10} or CH(CH_{3})_{2}CH_{3}	75-28-5	12 ± 3	0	3	1,000 A3	4,000	9.6	58.1	−11.7	134.7	3,640											
HC	R-601	pentane	C_{5}H_{12} or CH_{3}CH_{2}CH_{2}CH_{2}CH_{3}	109-66-0	12 ± 3	0	4 ± 2 (Note: Pentane, Isopentane & Ethoxyethane (Diethyl ether) is assumed to have a net GWP over 100-yr to be 4 ± 2.)	600 A3	1,000	2.9	72.1	36.1±.2	196.56	3,358											
HC	R-601a	isopentane	C_{5}H_{12} or (CH_{3})_{2}CHCH_{2}CH_{3}	78-78-4	12 ± 3	0	4 ± 2	600 A3	1,000	2.9	72.1	27.7	187.78	3,378											
HC	R-610	ethoxyethane (diethyl ether)	CH_{3}CH_{2}OCH_{2}CH_{3}	60-29-7	12 ± 3	< 0(smog)	4 ± 2	400 A3?			74.1	34.6	193.65	3,640											
HC	R-611	methyl formate	HCOOCH_{3}	107-31-3	12 ± 3	0	< 25	100 B2			60.1	32	213.55	6,000											
HC	HC-12a	propane/isobutane	40–70% C_{3}H_{8} · 30–60% C_{4}H_{6} (by volume)									−33													
HC	HC-22a	propane	C_{3}H_{8} 98% by volume									−42													
HC	HC-502a	propane/ethane	C_{3}H_{8} 60–100% · C_{2}H_{6} 3-7% (by volume)									−49													
HFC / HFO	DR-14A						415					−20.4	110.7	3,960											
HFC	SP34E	R-134a (98.5%)	C_{2}H_{2}F_{4} (98.5%)																						
	R-630	methylamine	CH_{3}NH_{2}	74-89-5							31.1	−6	156.89	7,460											
	R-631	ethylamine	CH_{3}CH_{2}(NH_{2})	75-04-7							45.1	16.6	183	5,620											
	R-702	hydrogen	H_{2}	1333-74-0			5.8	A3			2.016	−252.87	−239.95	1,300											
	R-704	helium	He	7440-59-7	Unlimited (Note: Air, nitrogen, oxygen & the noble gases are assumed to have an unlimited Atmospheric Lifetime, a Semi-Empirical ODP of zero (except oxygen being slightly less than zero) & net GWP over 100-yr to be zero (except air being the sum of its parts).)	0	0	9,340? A1			4.002	−268.93	−267.96	227											
	R-717	ammonia	NH_{3}	7664-41-7	< 0.019165	0	0	25 B2L	320	0.22	17.03	−33.34	132.4	11,280											
	R-718	water/steam	H_{2}O	7732-18-5	0.026	0	0.2 ± 0.2	A1			18.02	100	373.946	22,060											
	R-720	neon	Ne	7440-01-9	Unlimited	0	0	9,340? A1			20.18	−246.08	−228.75	2,760											
	R-728	nitrogen	N_{2}	7727-37-9	Unlimited	0	0	A1			28.01	−195.79	−146.9	3,390											
	R-729	air N_{2}/O_{2}/Ar (78.082/20.945/.934 vol%)	78.082% N_{2} · 20.945% O_{2} · .934% Ar		Unlimited	0	0.00054+	A1?			28.97	−192.97?	−140.53	3,785											
	R-732	oxygen	O_{2}	7782-44-7	Unlimited	< 0	0	A1?			32	−182.95	−118.6	5,050											
	R-740	argon	Ar	7440-37-1	Unlimited	0	0	9,340? A1			39.95	−185.85	−122.4	4,870											
	R-744	carbon dioxide	CO_{2}	124-38-9	29,300-36,100	0	1	5,000 A1	40,000	72	44	−56.56 at 518 kPa (Note: Triple point; substance sublimes at atmospheric pressure.)	31.04	7,380											
	R-744A	nitrous oxide	N_{2}O	10024-97-2	114	0.017	265	A1?			44	−88.48	36.4	7,240											
	R-764	sulfur dioxide	SO_{2}	7446-09-5				5 B1	100	0.262	64.1	−10	157.65	7,880											
	R-784	krypton	Kr	7439-90-9	Unlimited	0	0	9,340? A1?			83.80	−153.22	−63.8	5,500											
CFO	R-1112a	1,1-dichloro-2,2-difluoroethylene	C_{2}Cl_{2}F_{2}	79-35-6							132.9														
CFO	R-1113	chlorotrifluoroethylene	C_{2}ClF_{3}	79-38-9							116.5	−27.8													
PFO	R-1114	tetrafluoroethylene	C_{2}F_{4}	116-14-3		0					100	−76.3													
HCO	R-1120	trichloroethylene (trielene)	C_{2}HCl_{3}	79-01-6							131.4	87.2	297.78	4,909											
HCO	R-1130(E)	trans-1,2-dichloroethylene	C_{2}H_{2}Cl_{2}	156-60-5		0	< 25				96.9	48.5	243.28	5,481											
HFO	R-1132(E)	trans-1,2-difluoroethylene	C_{2}H_{2}F_{2}	1630-78-0		0					64	–52.5													
HFO	R-1132a	1,1-difluoroethylene	C_{2}H_{2}F_{2}	75-38-7		0					64	−83	29.7	4,458											
HCO	R-1140	chloroethylene (vinyl chloride)	C_{2}H_{3}Cl	75-01-4				100? B3			62.5	−13.4	151.83	5,150											
HFO	R-1141	fluoroethylene (vinyl fluoride)	C_{2}H_{3}F	75-02-5		0					46	−72.2													
HO	R-1150	ethene (ethylene)	CH_{2}=CH_{2}	74-85-1	12 ± 3	< 0(smog)	3.7	200 A3			28.05	−103.7	9.19	5,040											
PFO	R-1216	hexafluoropropylene	C_{3}F_{6}	116-15-4	1,000+	0	17,340+				150	−28													
PFO	R-1218	hexafluoropropene trimer	(C_{3}F_{6})_{3}	6792-31-0		0					450.1														
HCFO	R-1224yd(Z)	(Z)-2,3,3,3,-tetrafluoro-1-chloropropene	(Z)-CF3-CF=CHCl	111512-60-8	0.032 (21 days)	0.00012	<1				148.5	14°C	156°C	3330											
HCFO	R-1233zd(E)	trans-1-chloro-3,3,3-trifluoropropene	C_{3}H_{2}ClF_{3}	102687-65-0	0.0712328	0	1				130.5	19													
HFO	R-1234yf	2,3,3,3-tetrafluoropropene	C_{3}H_{2}F_{4}	754-12-1	0.030116	0	<1	500 A2L	16,000	75	114	−29.4													
HFO	R-1234ze(E)	trans-1,3,3,3-tetrafluoropropene	C_{3}H_{2}F_{4}	29118-24-9		0	<1	800 A2L	16,000	75	114	−19.0													
HO	R-1270	propene (propylene)	C_{3}H_{6} or CH_{3}CH=CH_{2}	115-07-1	12 ± 3	< 0(smog)	1.8	500 A3	1,000	1.7	42.1	−47.6	92.42	4,665											
HFO	R-1336mzz(E)	trans-1,1,1,4,4,4-hexafluoro-2-butene	C_{4}H_{2}F_{6}	66711-86-2		0	18					7.5	137.7	3,150											
HFO	R-1336mzz(Z) (DR-2)	cis-1,1,1,4,4,4-hexafluoro-2-butene	CF_{3}CH=CHCF_{3}(Z)	692-49-9		0	2	A1				37.4	171.3	2,900											
T y p e	ASHRAE number	IUPAC chemical name	Molecular formula	CAS no/ blend name	Atmospheric lifetime (years)	Semi- empirical ODP	Net GWP 100-yr	OEL/PEL ppm (v/v) & ASHRAE 34 safety group	RCL/IDLH		Molecular mass Da	Boiling, or bubble/dew /azeotropic point(s) °C	Critical temp. °C	Critical pressure, absolute kPa											
T y p e	ASHRAE number	IUPAC chemical name	Molecular formula	CAS no/ blend name	Atmospheric lifetime (years)	Semi- empirical ODP	Net GWP 100-yr	OEL/PEL ppm (v/v) & ASHRAE 34 safety group	ppm (v/v)	g/m^{3}	Molecular mass Da	Boiling, or bubble/dew /azeotropic point(s) °C	Critical temp. °C	Critical pressure, absolute kPa											

== Type and flammability ==
Legends

Types / Prefixes
Type	Meaning	Atoms in the molecule
CFC	chlorofluorocarbon	Cl, F, C
CFO	chlorofluoroolefin	Cl, F, C
HCFC	hydrochlorofluorocarbon	H, Cl, F, C
HCFO	hydrochlorofluoroolefin	H, Cl, F, C
HFC	hydrofluorocarbon	H, F, C
HFO	hydrofluoroolefin	H, F, C
HCC	hydrochlorocarbon	H, Cl, C
HCO	hydrochloroolefin	H, Cl, C
HC	hydrocarbon	H, C
HO	olefin (alkene)	H, C
PFC	perfluorocarbon	F, C
PFO	perfluoroolefin	F, C
PCC	perchlorocarbon	Cl, C
H	halon/haloalkane	Br, Cl (in some but not all), F, H (in some but not all), C

Safety classification of refrigerants
Flammability in air at 60 °C and 101.3 kPa	ASHRAE 34 safety group	
Higher flammability LFL or ETFL_{60} = 100 g/m^{3} OR HOC = 19 MJ/kg	A3	B3
Lower flammability LFL or ETFL_{60} > 100 g/m^{3} and HOC < 19 MJ/kg	A2	B2
Lower flammability LFL or ETFL_{60} > 100 g/m^{3} and HOC < 19 MJ/kg with a maximum burning velocity of = 10 cm/s	A2L	B2L
No flame propagation	A1	B1
Flammability in air at 60 °C and 101.3 kPa	Lower toxicity OEL ≥ 400 ppm	Higher toxicity OEL < 400 ppm

LFL = lower flammability limit
ETFL_{60} = elevated temperature flame limit at 60 °C
HOC = heat of combustion

Compounds used as refrigerants may be described using either the appropriate prefix above or with the prefixes "R-" or "refrigerant". Thus, CFC-12 may also be written as R-12 or Refrigerant 12.
An alkene, olefin, or olefine is an unsaturated compound containing at least one carbon-carbon double bond.

Educated estimates

== See also ==
- Haloalkane
- Refrigerant
