= Dichlorodifluoroethane =

Dichlorodifluoroethane can refer to the following compounds:

- 1,2-Dichloro-1,2-difluoroethane (R-132), two isomers
- 1,1-Dichloro-2,2-difluoroethane (R-132a)
- 1,2-Dichloro-1,1-difluoroethane (R-132b)
- 1,1-Dichloro-1,2-difluoroethane (R-132c)
