= Bromodifluoromethane =

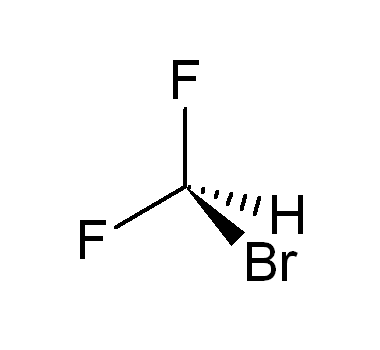

Names
- Preferred IUPAC name Bromo(difluoro)methane
- Other names: Bromodifluoromethane; Difluorobromomethane; Halon 1201; HBFC-22B1; FC-22B1; R-22B1; FM-100

Identifiers
CAS Number	1511-62-2
3D model (JSmol)	Interactive image; Interactive image
ChemSpider	56193
ECHA InfoCard	100.014.681
EC Number	216-149-1
PubChem CID	62407
UNII	L1F4C2FIBR
CompTox Dashboard (EPA)	DTXSID5061740
- InChI: InChI=1S/CHBrF2/c2-1(3)4/h1H Key: GRCDJFHYVYUNHM-UHFFFAOYSA-N; InChI=1/CHBrF2/c2-1(3)4/h1H
- SMILES: C(F)(F)Br; BrC(F)F

Properties
Chemical formula	CHBrF_{2}
Molar mass	130.92 g/mol
Appearance	Gas
Density	1.55 g/cm^{3} at 16 °C
Melting point	−145 °C (−229 °F; 128 K)
Boiling point	−14.6 °C (5.7 °F; 258.5 K)
Solubility in water	Insoluble
Solubility	Alcohol, diethyl ether
- Except where otherwise noted, data are given for materials in their standard state (at 25 °C [77 °F], 100 kPa). verify (what is ?) Infobox references

Bromodifluoromethane or Halon 1201 or FC-22B1 is a gaseous trihalomethane or a hydrobromofluorocarbon.

== Synthesis ==
It can be prepared through the reaction of hydrogen and dibromodifluoromethane at temperature in range 400–600 °C.

Critical point data: T_{c} = 138.83 °C (411.98 K); p_{c} = 5.2 MPa (51.32 bar); V_{c} = 0.275 dm^{3}·mol^{−1}.

== Applications ==
Bromodifluoromethane was used as a refrigerant and in fire extinguishers. It is a class I ozone depleting substance with ozone depletion potential ODP = 0.74, and a greenhouse gas with global warming potential over 100 years of 398, which is nonetheless much smaller than other fluorinated gases due to its relatively short atmospheric lifetime of 5.2 years. It was banned by the Montreal Protocol in 1996.
