= 1,1-Dichloro-1-fluoroethane =

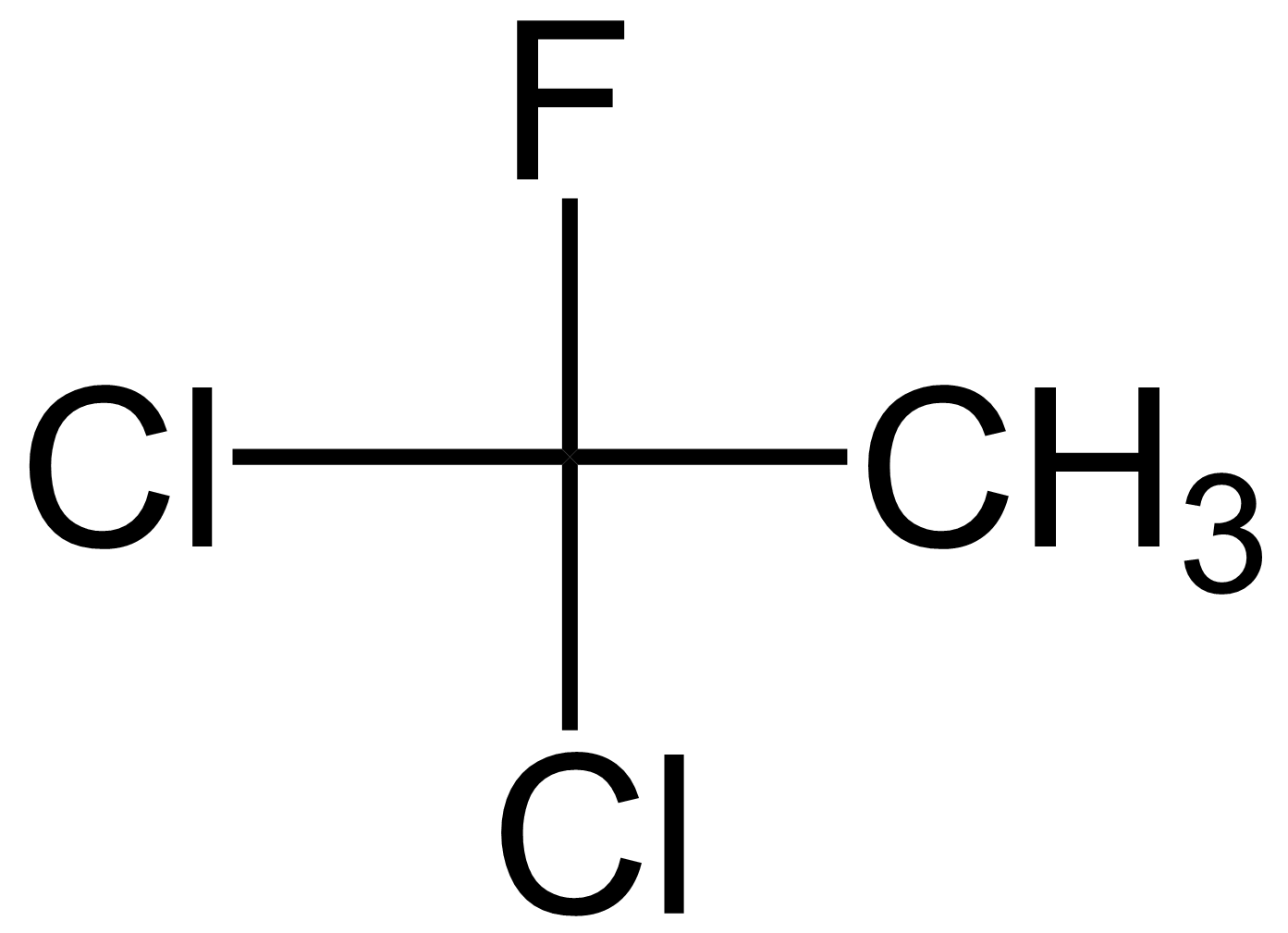
Structures of 1,1-dichloro-1-fluoroethane
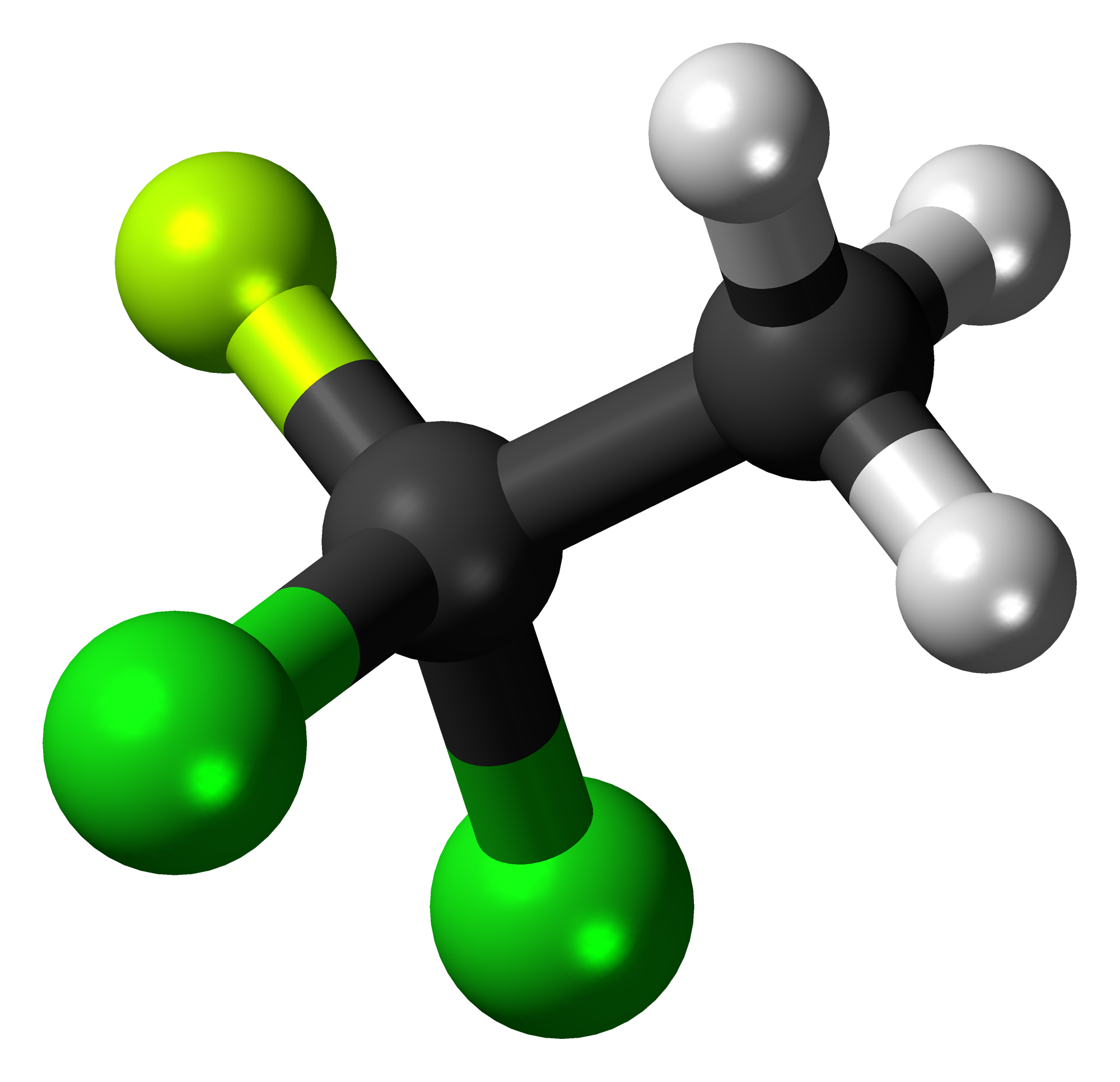
C=black, H=white, F=yellow, Cl=green

Names
- Preferred IUPAC name 1,1-Dichloro-1-fluoroethane
- Other names Dichlorofluoroethane; R-141b; HCFC-141b

Identifiers
CAS Number	1717-00-6
3D model (JSmol)	Interactive image
ChemSpider	14829
ECHA InfoCard	100.100.575
EC Number	404-080-1
PubChem CID	15586
RTECS number	KI0997000
UNII	O1A3ASY5PW
UN number	9274
CompTox Dashboard (EPA)	DTXSID2020422
- InChI: InChI=1S/C2H3Cl2F/c1-2(3,4)5/h1H3 Key: FRCHKSNAZZFGCA-UHFFFAOYSA-N; InChI=1/C2H3Cl2F/c1-2(3,4)5/h1H3 Key: FRCHKSNAZZFGCA-UHFFFAOYAI
- SMILES: ClC(Cl)(F)C

Properties
Chemical formula	C_{2}H_{3}Cl_{2}F
Molar mass	116.94 g·mol^{−1}
Appearance	Colorless liquid, ethereal odor
Density	1.25 g/cm^{3} at 20 °C
Melting point	−103.5 °C (−154.3 °F; 169.7 K)
Boiling point	32 °C (90 °F; 305 K)
Solubility in water	4 g/L (20 °C)

Hazards
- GHS labelling
Pictograms	(GHS07: Exclamation mark)
Signal word	Warning
Hazard statements	H412, H420
Precautionary statements	P273, P501, P502
Autoignition temperature	532 °C (990 °F; 805 K)
Explosive limits	5.6–17.7% vol.
- Lethal dose or concentration (LD, LC)
LD_{50} (median dose)	5 g/kg (rat, oral)
- Except where otherwise noted, data are given for materials in their standard state (at 25 °C [77 °F], 100 kPa). verify (what is ?) Infobox references

1,1-Dichloro-1-fluoroethane is a haloalkane with the formula C_{2}H_{3}Cl_{2}F. It is one of the three isomers of dichlorofluoroethane. It belongs to the hydrochlorofluorocarbon (HCFC) family of man-made compounds that contribute significantly to both ozone depletion and global warming when released into the environment.

== Physiochemical properties ==
1,1-Dichloro-1-fluoroethane can be a non-flammable, colourless liquid under room-temperature atmospheric conditions. The compound is very volatile with a boiling point of 32°C. Its critical temperature is near 204°C. Its smell has been described as "usually ethereal" (like ether).

== Production and use ==
1,1-Dichloro-1-fluoroethane is mainly used as a solvent and foam blowing agent under the names R-141b and HCFC-141b. It is a class 2 ozone depleting substance undergoing a global phaseout from production and use under the Montreal Protocol since the late 1990s. It is being replaced by HFCs within some applications.

== Environmental effects ==
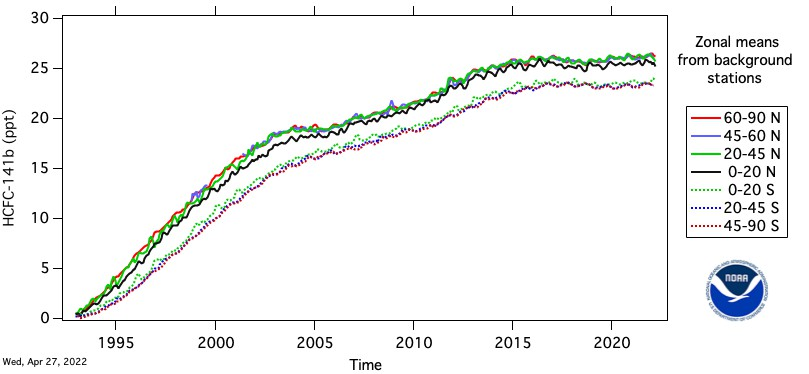
Growth of HCFC-141b in Earth's atmosphere since year 1993.

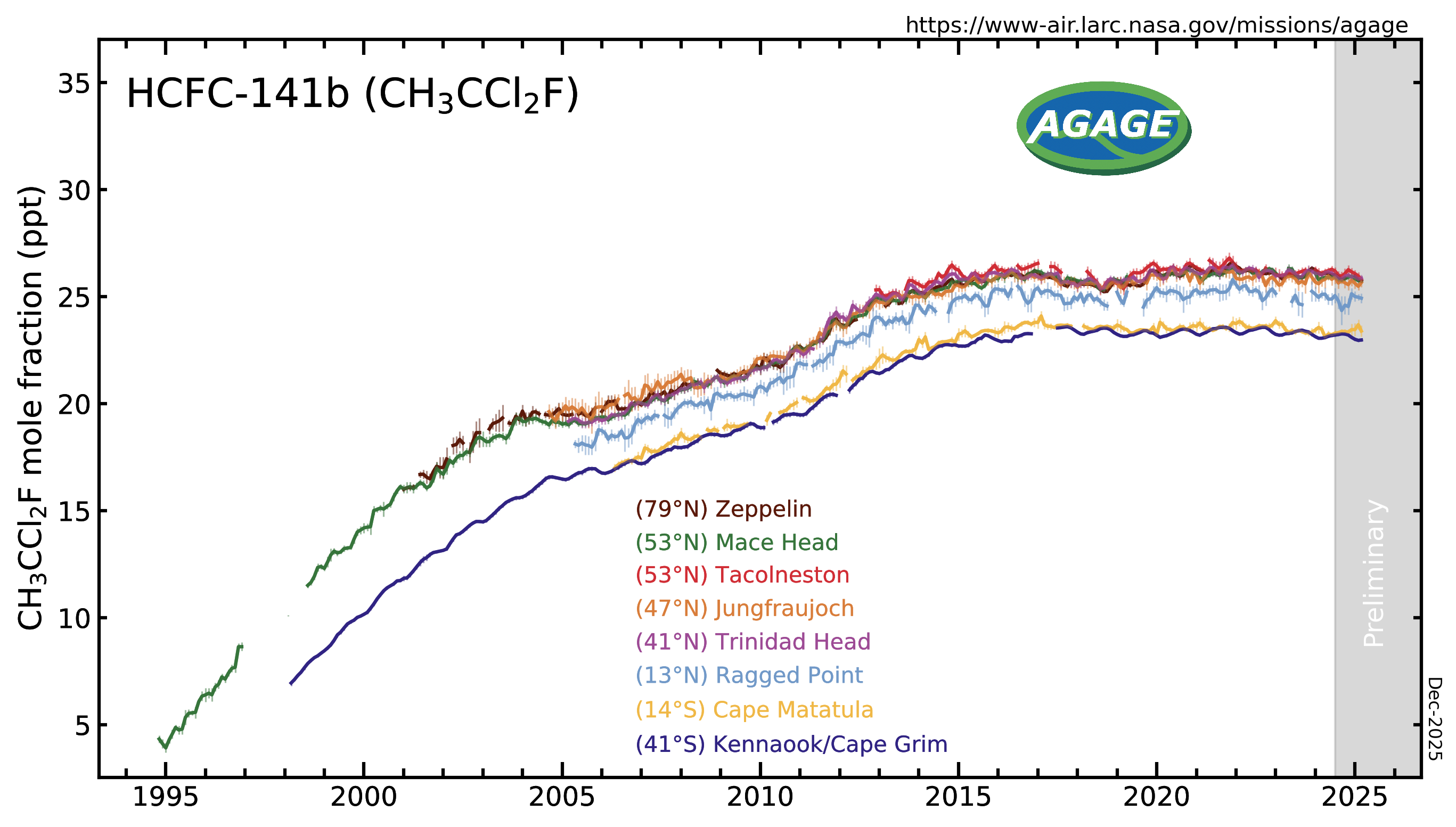
HCFC-141b measured by the Advanced Global Atmospheric Gases Experiment (AGAGE) in the lower atmosphere (troposphere) at stations around the world. Abundances are given as pollution free monthly mean mole fractions in parts-per-trillion.

The concentration of HCFC-141b in the atmosphere grew to near 25 parts per trillion by year 2016. It has an ozone depletion potential (ODP) of 0.12. This is low compared to the ODP=1 of trichlorofluoromethane (CFC-11, R-11), which also grew about ten times more abundant in the atmosphere prior to introduction of HFC-141b and subsequent adoption of the Montreal Protocol.

HFC-141b is also a minor but potent greenhouse gas. It has an estimated lifetime of about 10 years and a 100-year global warming potential ranging 725 to 2500. This compares to the GWP=1 of carbon dioxide, which had a much greater atmospheric concentration near 400 parts per million in year 2020.

== See also ==
- IPCC list of greenhouse gases
- List of refrigerants
