= Chloropentafluoroethane =

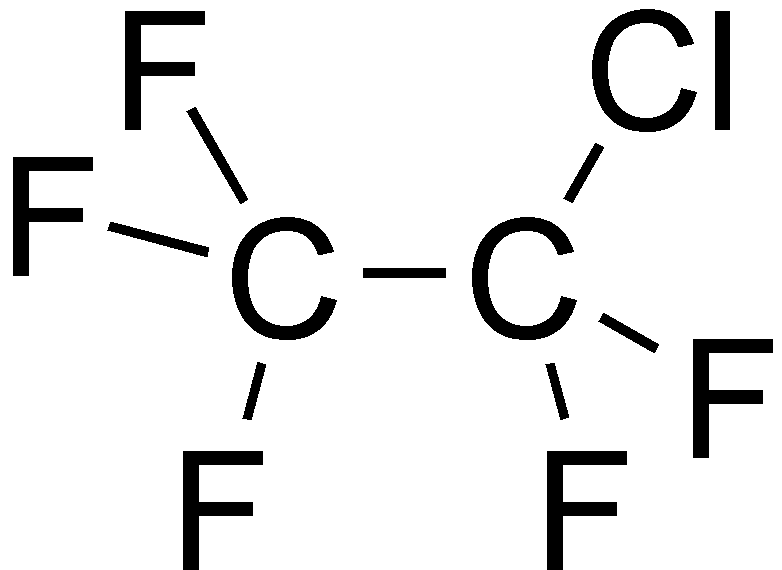

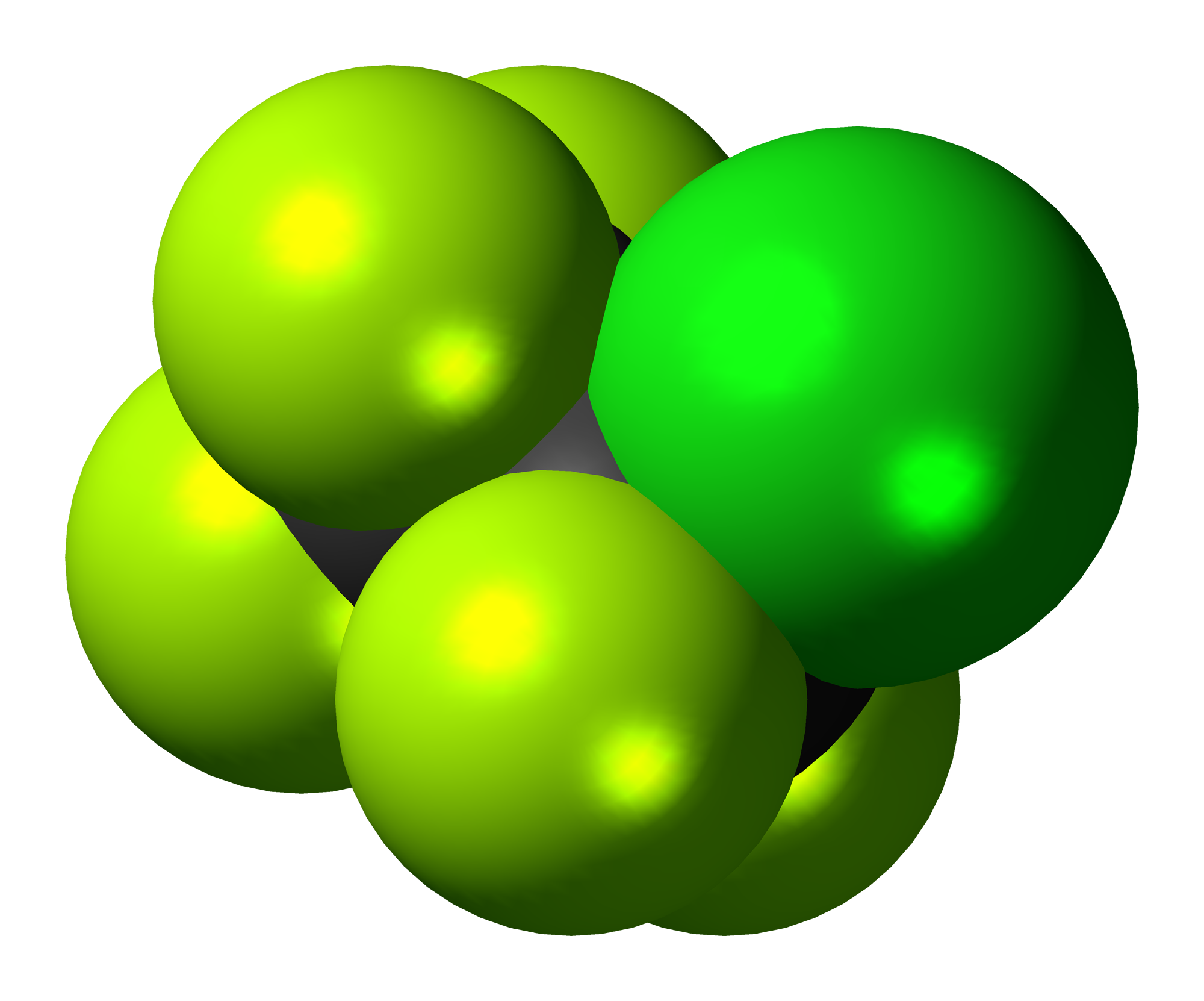

Names
- Preferred IUPAC name 1-Chloro-1,1,2,2,2-pentafluoroethane
- Other names Freon 115, CFC-115, R-115, Fluorocarbon-115, Genetron 115, Halocarbon 115, Monochloropentafluoroethane

Identifiers
| CAS Number | 76-15-3 |
| 3D model (JSmol) | Interactive image |
| ChEMBL | ChEMBL502216 |
| ChemSpider | 6190 |
| ECHA InfoCard | 100.000.854 |
| EC Number | 200-938-2 |
| E number | E945 (glazing agents, ...) |
| PubChem CID | 6430 |
| RTECS number | KH7877500 |
| UNII | SJG47X19V4 |
| UN number | 1020 |
| CompTox Dashboard (EPA) | DTXSID3026435 |
- InChI: InChI=1S/C2ClF5/c3-1(4,5)2(6,7)8 Key: RFCAUADVODFSLZ-UHFFFAOYSA-N; InChI=1/C2ClF5/c3-1(4,5)2(6,7)8 Key: RFCAUADVODFSLZ-UHFFFAOYAH
- SMILES: FC(F)(F)C(Cl)(F)F

Properties
| Chemical formula | C_{2}ClF_{5} |
| Molar mass | 154.466 g/mol |
| Appearance | Colorless gas |
| Odor | Ethereal |
| Melting point | −99 °C (−146 °F; 174 K) |
| Boiling point | −39.1 °C (−38.4 °F; 234.1 K) |
| Solubility in water | 59 mg/L |
| Vapor pressure | 7.9 atm (21°C) |

Hazards
- Occupational safety and health (OHS/OSH)
| Main hazards | In high concentrations may cause asphyxiation. |
- GHS labelling
| Pictograms | (GHS01: Explosive) (GHS07: Exclamation mark) |
| Signal word | Warning |
| Hazard statements | H420 |
| Precautionary statements | P410+P403, P502 |
| Flash point | 70.4 °C (158.7 °F; 343.5 K) |
- NIOSH (US health exposure limits)
| PEL (Permissible) | none |
| REL (Recommended) | TWA 1000 ppm (6320 mg/m^{3}) |
| IDLH (Immediate danger) | N.D. |
- Except where otherwise noted, data are given for materials in their standard state (at 25 °C [77 °F], 100 kPa). verify (what is ?) Infobox references

Chloropentafluoroethane is a chlorofluorocarbon (CFC) once used as a refrigerant and also known as R-115 and CFC-115. Its production and consumption has been banned since 1 January 1996 under the Montreal Protocol because of its high ozone depletion potential and very long lifetime when released into the environment. CFC-115 is also a potent greenhouse gas.

== Atmospheric properties ==
The atmospheric abundance of CFC-115 rose from 8.4 parts per trillion (ppt) in year 2010 to 8.7 ppt in 2020 based on analysis of air samples gathered from sites around the world.

| Property | Value |
|---|---|
| Ozone depletion potential (ODP) | 0.44 (CCl_{3}F = 1) |
| Global warming potential (GWP: 100-year) | 5,860 - 7,670 (CO_{2} = 1) |
| Atmospheric lifetime | 1,020 - 1,700 years |

== Gallery ==
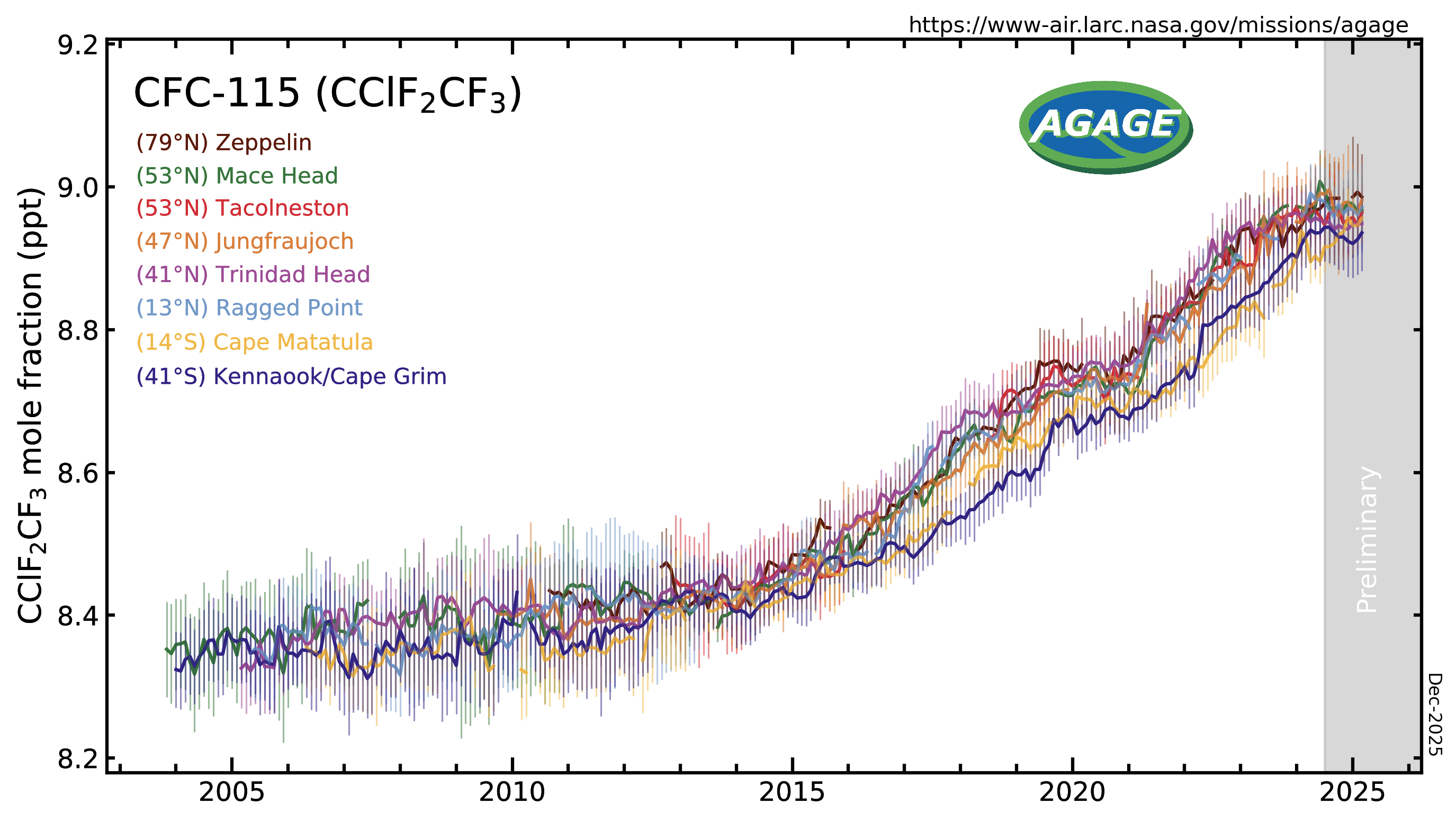
CFC-115 measured by the Advanced Global Atmospheric Gases Experiment (AGAGE) in the lower atmosphere (troposphere) at stations around the world. Abundances are given as pollution free monthly mean mole fractions in parts-per-trillion.

== See also ==
- IPCC list of greenhouse gases
- List of refrigerants
