= 1-Fluoropropane =

- Structural formula

Names
- Preferred IUPAC name 1-Fluoropropane
- Other names n-fluoropropane n-propyl fluoride R 281fa

Identifiers
CAS Number	460-13-9
3D model (JSmol)	Interactive image
Abbreviations	PrF n-PrF nPrF^{n}PrF
ChemSpider	9604
PubChem CID	9998
CompTox Dashboard (EPA)	DTXSID00196679
- InChI: InChI=1S/C3H7F/c1-2-3-4/h2-3H2,1H3 Key: JRHNUZCXXOTJCA-UHFFFAOYSA-N
- SMILES: CCCF

Properties
Chemical formula	C_{3}H_{7}F
Molar mass	62.087 g·mol^{−1}
Density	0.782 g/cm^{3}
Melting point	−159 °C (−254 °F; 114 K)
Boiling point	−3.2 – −2.5 °C (26.2–27.5 °F; 269.9–270.6 K)
Henry's law constant (k_{H})	6.3×10^{-4} mol/(m^{3}Pa) at 25 °C
Refractive index (n_{D})	1.3225

Hazards
- GHS labelling
Hazard statements	H221, H280
NFPA 704 (fire diamond)	2 3 0

Related compounds
Related compounds	2-Fluoropropane; 1-Chloropropane; 1-Bromopropane; 1-Iodopropane
- Except where otherwise noted, data are given for materials in their standard state (at 25 °C [77 °F], 100 kPa). Infobox references

1-Fluoropropane is an organofluorine compound with the formula C_{3}H_{7}F or CH_{3}CH_{2}CH_{2}F. At standard conditions it is a gas.

== Properties ==
The melting point is −159 °C which is lower than fluoromethane, fluoroethane and 2-fluoropropane.

The refractive index (at sodium D line) of the liquid at the boiling point is 1.3225 slightly below that of 2-fluoropropane.

== Preparation ==
1-Fluoropropane can be prepared by heating cyclopropane with hydrogen fluoride. If propene is used instead, the result is 2-fluoropropane.
