= Chlorotrifluoromethane =

Names
- Preferred IUPAC name Chloro(trifluoro)methane
- Other names Chlorotrifluoromethane; Monochlorotrifluoromethane; Trifluorochloromethane; Trifluoromethyl chloride Trifluoromonochlorocarbon; Arcton 3 Freon 13; Genetron 13; R-13; CFC 13; UN 1022

Identifiers
CAS Number	75-72-9
3D model (JSmol)	Interactive image
ChemSpider	6152
ECHA InfoCard	100.000.814
EC Number	200-894-4
PubChem CID	6392
RTECS number	PA6410000
UNII	7C6U91JNED
CompTox Dashboard (EPA)	DTXSID4052500
- InChI: InChI=1S/CClF3/c2-1(3,4)5 Key: AFYPFACVUDMOHA-UHFFFAOYSA-N; InChI=1/CClF3/c2-1(3,4)5 Key: AFYPFACVUDMOHA-UHFFFAOYAV
- SMILES: ClC(F)(F)F

Properties
Chemical formula	CClF_{3}
Molar mass	104.46 g/mol
Appearance	Colorless gas with sweet odor
Density	1.526 g/cm^{3}
Melting point	−181 °C (−293.8 °F; 92.1 K)
Boiling point	−81.5 °C (−114.7 °F; 191.7 K)
Solubility in water	0.009% at 25 °C (77 °F)
Vapor pressure	3.263 MPa at 21 °C (70 °F)
Thermal conductivity	0.01217 W m^{−1} K^{−1} (300 K)

Hazards
- Occupational safety and health (OHS/OSH)
Main hazards	Ozone depletor and asphyxiant
Flash point	Non-flammable
Safety data sheet (SDS)	ICSC 0420
- Except where otherwise noted, data are given for materials in their standard state (at 25 °C [77 °F], 100 kPa). verify (what is ?) Infobox references

Chlorotrifluoromethane, R-13, CFC-13, or Freon 13, is a non-flammable, non-corrosive, nontoxic chlorofluorocarbon (CFC) and also a mixed halomethane. It is a man-made substance used primarily as a refrigerant. When released into the environment, CFC-13 has a high ozone depletion potential, and long atmospheric lifetime. Only a few other greenhouse gases surpass CFC-13 in global warming potential (GWP). The IPCC AR5 reported that CFC-13's atmospheric lifetime was 640 years.

== Production ==
CFC-13—like all chlorofluorocarbon compounds—contains atoms of carbon (C), chlorine (Cl), and fluorine (F).

It can be prepared by reacting carbon tetrachloride with hydrogen fluoride in the presence of a catalytic amount of antimony pentachloride:

CCl_{4} + 3 HF → CClF_{3} + 3 HCl

This reaction can also produce trichlorofluoromethane (CCl_{3}F), dichlorodifluoromethane (CCl_{2}F_{2}) and tetrafluoromethane (CF_{4}).

== Montreal Protocol ==
Following the unanimous ratification of the 1987 Montreal Protocol—in response to concerns about the role of concentrations of chlorofluorocarbons (CFCs) in ozone layer-depletion in the stratosphere—a process was put into place to gradually phase out and replace CFC-13 and all the other CFCs. Research in the 1980s said that these man-made CFC compounds had opened a hole in ozone layer in the upper atmosphere or stratosphere that protects life on earth from UV radiation.

CFC-13's ozone depletion potential (ODP) is high— 1 (CCl_{3}F = 1)—it is categorized as a Class I in the IPCC's list of ozone-depleting substances. CFC-13's radiative efficiency is high which results in a high global warming potential (GWPs) of 13 900 GWP-100 yr that is "surpassed by very few other greenhouse gases." It is categorized as a Class I in the list of ozone-depleting Substances.

=== Increase in atmospheric abundance of CFC-13 in 2010s ===
Starting in the 2010s, despite a global ban on the production of CFCs, five of these ozone-damaging emissions were on the rise.

The atmospheric abundance of CFC-13 rose from 3.0 parts per trillion (ppt) in year 2010 to 3.3 ppt in year 2020 based on analysis of air samples gathered from sites around the world. Contrary to the Montreal Protocol, the atmospheric emissions of CFC-13 and four other chlorofluorocarbons (CFCs), increased between 2010 and 2020.

As of 2023, the drivers behind the increase in CFC-13 and CFC-112a emissions were not certain.

== Physical properties ==
The IPCC AR5 reported that CFC-13's Atmospheric lifetime was 640 years.

Property	Value
Density (ρ) at −127.8 °C (liquid)	1.603 g⋅cm^{−3}
Density (ρ) at boiling point (gas)	6.94 kg⋅m^{−3}
Density (ρ) at 15 °C (gas)	4.41 g⋅cm^{−3}
Triple point temperature (T_{t})	−181 °C (92 K)
Critical temperature (T_{c})	28.8 °C (302 K)
Critical pressure (p_{c})	3.86 MPa (38.6 bar)
Critical density (ρ_{c})	5.5 mol⋅L^{−1}
Latent heat of vaporization at boiling point	149.85 kJ⋅kg^{−1}
Specific heat capacity at constant pressure (C_{p}) at −34.4 °C	0.06 kJ⋅mol^{−1}⋅K^{−1}
Specific heat capacity at constant volume (C_{V}) at −34.4 °C	0.051 kJ⋅mol^{−1}⋅K^{−1}
Heat capacity ratio (к) at −34.4 °C	1.168016
Compressibility Factor (Z) at 15 °C	0.9896
Acentric factor (ω)	0.17166
Viscosity (η) at 0 °C (gas)	13.3 mPa⋅s (0.0133 cP)
Viscosity (η) at 25 °C (gas)	14.1 mPa⋅s (0.01440 cP)
Ozone depletion potential (ODP)	1(CCl_{3}F = 1)
Global warming potential (GWP)	14,000 (CO_{2} = 1)
Atmospheric lifetime	640 years

== Gallery ==
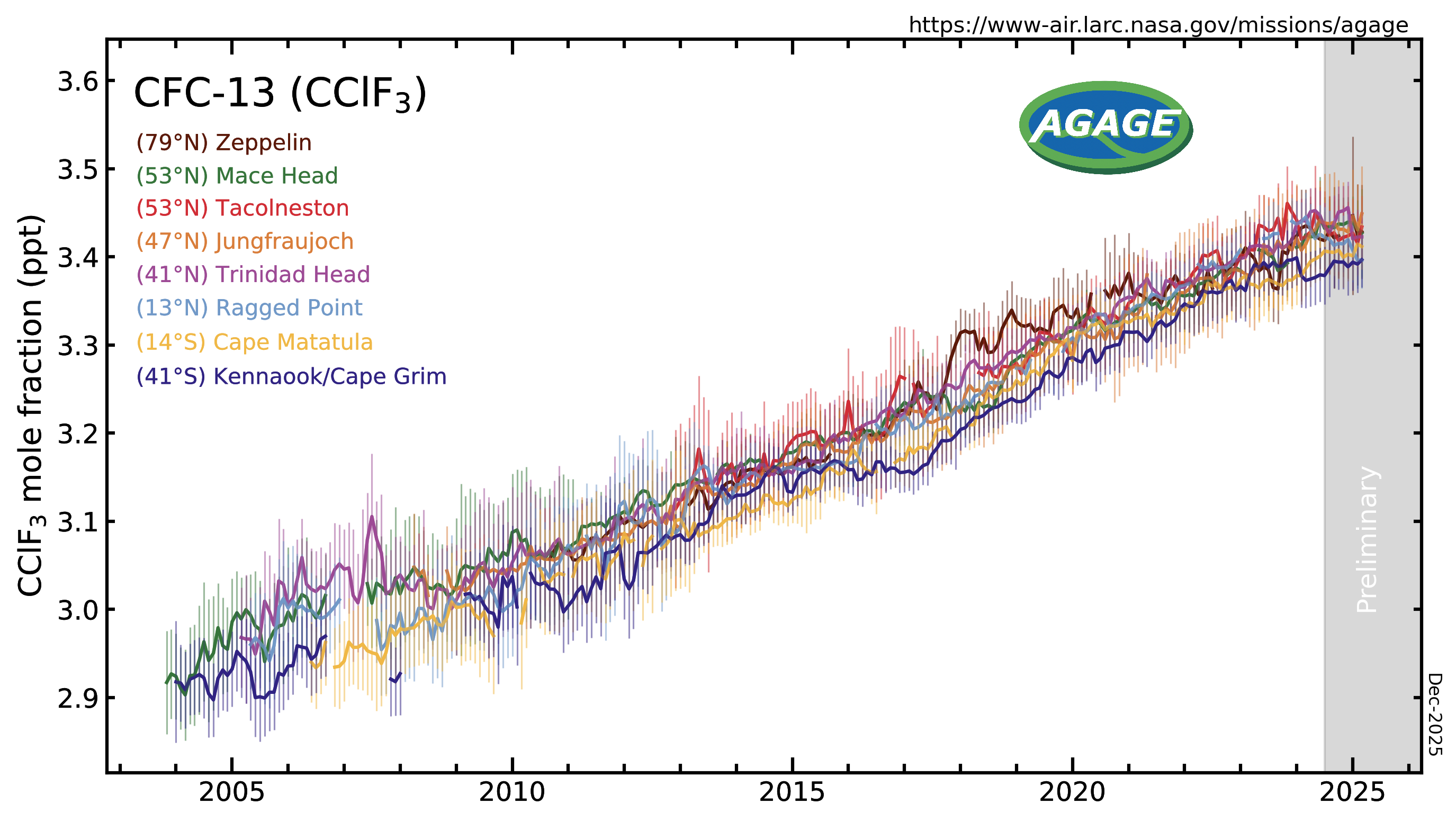
CFC-13 measured by the Advanced Global Atmospheric Gases Experiment (AGAGE) in the lower atmosphere (troposphere) at stations around the world. Abundances are given as pollution free monthly mean mole fractions in parts-per-trillion.

== See also ==
- IPCC list of greenhouse gases
- List of refrigerants
