= Fluoroethane =

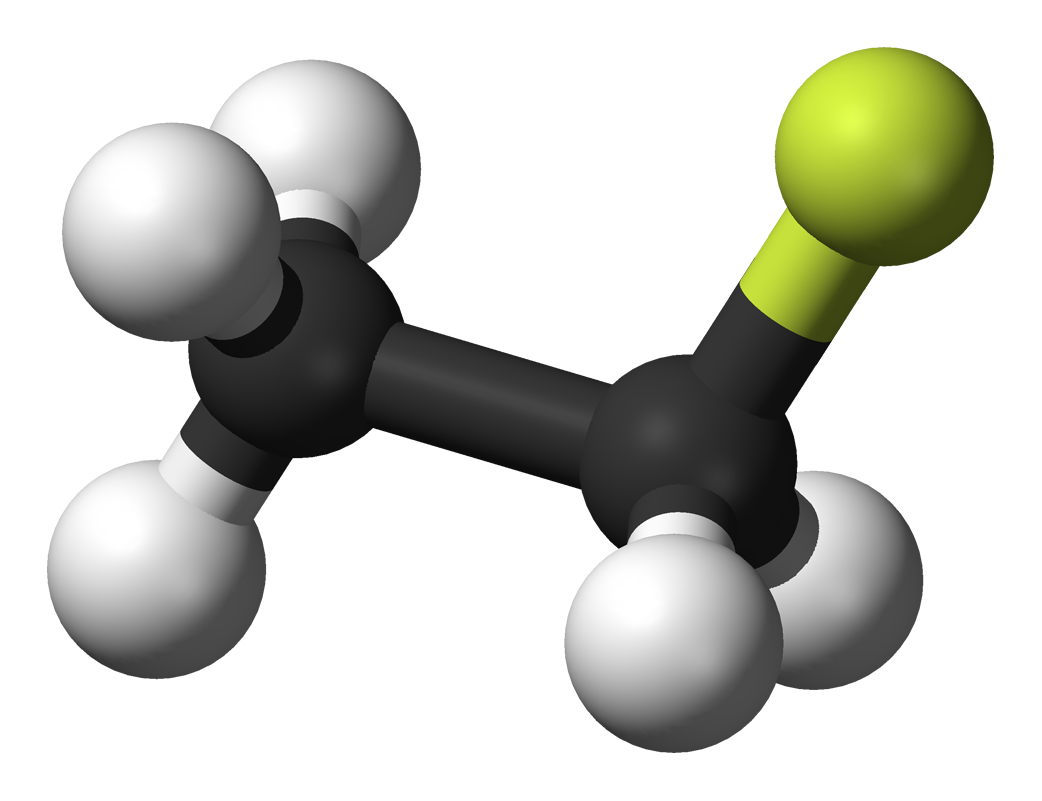

Names
- IUPAC name Fluoroethane
- Other names Ethyl fluoride, HFC-161

Identifiers
CAS Number	353-36-6
3D model (JSmol)	Interactive image
Abbreviations	EtF
ChemSpider	9243
ECHA InfoCard	100.005.938
EC Number	206-531-6
PubChem CID	9620
UNII	XO7SPI984C
UN number	2453
CompTox Dashboard (EPA)	DTXSID2059857
- InChI: InChI=1S/C2H5F/c1-2-3/h2H2,1H3 Key: UHCBBWUQDAVSMS-UHFFFAOYSA-N
- SMILES: CCF

Properties
Chemical formula	C_{2}H_{5}F
Molar mass	48.060 g·mol^{−1}
Appearance	Clear, colourless gas
Odor	Odorless
Boiling point	−37 °C (−35 °F; 236 K)

Hazards
- GHS labelling
Pictograms	(GHS02: Flammable) (GHS05: Corrosive)
Signal word	Danger
Hazard statements	H220, H280
Precautionary statements	P203, P210, P222, P280, P377, P381, P403, P410+P403
NFPA 704 (fire diamond)	2 4 0 SA
- Lethal dose or concentration (LD, LC)
LD_{Lo} (lowest published)	26 pph/4H (rat, inhalation)

Related compounds
Related compounds	Fluoromethane; Fluoropropane; 1,1-Difluoroethane; 1,2-Difluoroethane; 1,1,1-Trifluoroethane; 1,1,2-Trifluoroethane; Vinyl fluoride
- Except where otherwise noted, data are given for materials in their standard state (at 25 °C [77 °F], 100 kPa). Infobox references

Fluoroethane (also known as ethyl fluoride) is a hydrofluorocarbon with the chemical formula C_{2}H_{5}F). It is a volatile derivative of ethane. It appears as a colourless, odorless flammable gas at room temperature. Fluoroethane can also cause asphyxiation by the displacement of oxygen in air.

== Reactivity ==
Fluoroethane is incompatible with most strong reducing agents and oxidizers, and may be incompatible with many amines, nitrides, azo/diazo compounds, alkali metals, and epoxides. It is part of the wider class of substances known as fluorinated organic compounds.

== See also ==
- F-Gases
- List of Refrigerants
