= Chlorotrifluoropropane =

Names
- IUPAC name Chlorotrifluoropropane
- Other names Freon 253, HCFC-253fb

Identifiers
CAS Number	460-35-5
3D model (JSmol)	Interactive image
ChemSpider	9606
ECHA InfoCard	100.006.644
EC Number	207-307-0
PubChem CID	10000
UNII	5C535H1OII
UN number	3082
CompTox Dashboard (EPA)	DTXSID5042033
- InChI: InChI=InChI=1S/C3H4ClF3/c4-2-1-3(5,6)7/h1-2H2 Key: ZPIFKCVYZBVZIV-UHFFFAOYSA-N
- SMILES: C(CCl)C(F)(F)F

Properties
Chemical formula	C_{3}H_{4}ClF_{3}
Molar mass	132.51 g·mol^{−1}
Appearance	Clear, colorless
Odor	Odorless
Melting point	−106.5 °C (−159.7 °F; 166.7 K)
Boiling point	45.1 °C (113.2 °F; 318.2 K)

Hazards
- Occupational safety and health (OHS/OSH)
Main hazards	Inhalation
- GHS labelling
Pictograms	(GHS06: Toxic)
Signal word	Danger
Hazard statements	H301, H331
Precautionary statements	P261, P264, P270, P271, P301+P316, P304+P340, P316, P321, P330, P403+P233, P405, P501
- Except where otherwise noted, data are given for materials in their standard state (at 25 °C [77 °F], 100 kPa). verify (what is ?) Infobox references

Chlorotrifluoropropane (also known as 1-chloro-3,3,3-trifluoropropane or R-253) is a hydrochlorofluorocarbon with the chemical formula C_{3}H_{4}F_{3}Cl) . It is a volatile derivative propane. It appears as a colourless, odorless non-flammable liquid.

== Toxicity and reactivity ==
Chlorotrifluoropropane is acutely toxic and upon heating to decomposition, it will emit chlorine and fluorine gases, both of which can be toxic to living organisms at low concentrations. Chlorotrifluoropropane will not readily undergo a reaction with water or air.

== See also ==
- F-Gases
- List of Refrigerants
