= C3H7F =

The molecular formula C_{3}H_{7}F (molar mass: 62.087 g/mol, exact mass: 62.0532 u) may refer to:

- 1-Fluoropropane, or n-fluoropropane
- 2-Fluoropropane, isopropyl fluoride, or isofluoropropane
