= 1,2-Dichloro-1,1-difluoroethane =

Names
- Preferred IUPAC name 1,2-Dichloro-1,1-difluoroethane
- Other names R-132b, HCFC-132b

Identifiers
CAS Number	1649-08-7
3D model (JSmol)	Interactive image
ChemSpider	14694
ECHA InfoCard	100.015.196
EC Number	216-714-2
PubChem CID	15442
UNII	K90K8VM1NQ
UN number	3082
CompTox Dashboard (EPA)	DTXSID5031393
- InChI: InChI=1S/C2H2Cl2F2/c3-1-2(4,5)6/h1H2 Key: SKDFWEPBABSFMG-UHFFFAOYSA-N
- SMILES: C(C(F)(F)Cl)Cl

Properties
Chemical formula	C_{2}H_{2}Cl_{2}F_{2}
Molar mass	134.93 g·mol^{−1}
Appearance	colorless liquid
Density	1.42 g/ml (at 20 °C)
Melting point	−101.2 °C (−150.2 °F; 172.0 K)
Boiling point	46.8 °C (116.2 °F; 319.9 K)
- Except where otherwise noted, data are given for materials in their standard state (at 25 °C [77 °F], 100 kPa). Infobox references

1,2-Dichloro-1,1-difluoroethane (also R-132b or HCFC-132b) is a haloalkane and a hydrochlorofluorocarbon. It is an intermediate during the production of HFC-134a. According to a 2022 report by the WMO and other agencies, it has an ODP of 0.038 and a 100-year GWP of 332. It has been detected in the atmosphere at concentrations of up to 0.17 parts per trillion, probably because of its use during the production of other chemicals. Most emissions seem to come from East Asia.
