= 1,1-Dichloro-1,2-difluoroethane =

Names
- Other names R-132c, HCFC-132c

Identifiers
CAS Number	1842-05-3
3D model (JSmol)	Interactive image
ChemSpider	30711
PubChem CID	33239
UN number	3082
CompTox Dashboard (EPA)	DTXSID7073278
- InChI: InChI=1S/C2H2Cl2F2/c3-2(4,6)1-5/h1H2 Key: OIQOUHIUUREZOM-UHFFFAOYSA-N
- SMILES: C(C(F)(Cl)Cl)F

Properties
Chemical formula	C_{2}H_{2}Cl_{2}F_{2}
Molar mass	134.93 g·mol^{−1}
Appearance	Clear, colorless
Odor	Odorless
Melting point	−106.5 °C (−159.7 °F; 166.7 K)
Boiling point	45.1 °C (113.2 °F; 318.2 K)

Hazards
- Occupational safety and health (OHS/OSH)
Main hazards	Inhalation
- GHS labelling
Pictograms	(GHS06: Toxic)
Signal word	Danger
Hazard statements	H301, H331
Precautionary statements	P261, P264, P270, P271, P301+P316, P304+P340, P316, P321, P330, P403+P233, P405, P501
- Except where otherwise noted, data are given for materials in their standard state (at 25 °C [77 °F], 100 kPa). verify (what is ?) Infobox references

1,1-Dichloro-1,2-difluoroethane (also known as HCFC-132c or R-132c) is a hydrochlorofluorocarbon. It is a volatile derivative of ethane. It appears as a colourless, odorless non-flammable liquid. The use of HCFC-132c is restricted by the US EPA through the Clean Air Act Amendments of 1990 which intend to phase-out the use of substances that deplete the ozone layer. HCFC-132c is cited as an ozone depleting substance; it is considered as a class II substance by the EPA.

== See also ==
- F-Gases
- List of Refrigerants
