= Dibromodifluoromethane =

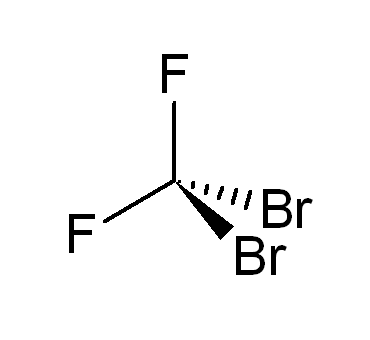

Names
- Preferred IUPAC name Dibromo(difluoro)methane
- Other names Dibromodifluoromethane; Difluorodibromomethane; Carbon dibromide difluoride Carbon bromide fluoride Halon 1202; Fluorocarbon 12-B2; FC 12-B2; R 12B2; UN 1941; Freon 12B2

Identifiers
CAS Number	75-61-6
3D model (JSmol)	Interactive image
ChEMBL	ChEMBL499553
ChemSpider	6142
ECHA InfoCard	100.000.805
EC Number	200-885-5
PubChem CID	6382
RTECS number	PA7525000
UNII	82022727JD
UN number	1941
CompTox Dashboard (EPA)	DTXSID9058789
- InChI: InChI=1S/CBr2F2/c2-1(3,4)5 Key: AZSZCFSOHXEJQE-UHFFFAOYSA-N; InChI=1/CBr2F2/c2-1(3,4)5
- SMILES: BrC(F)(F)Br

Properties
Chemical formula	CBr_{2}F_{2}
Molar mass	209.82 g/mol
Appearance	Colourless gas/liquid
Density	8.7 kg/m^{3} (for gas); 2.27 g/cm^{3} (for liquid)
Melting point	−101.1 °C (−150.0 °F; 172.1 K)
Boiling point	22.8 °C (73.0 °F; 295.9 K)
Solubility in water	insoluble
log P	1.99
Vapor pressure	83 kPa at 20 °C

Hazards
- GHS labelling
Pictograms	(GHS07: Exclamation mark)
Signal word	Warning
Hazard statements	H420
Precautionary statements	P502
NFPA 704 (fire diamond)	2 0 0
Flash point	Non-flammable
- NIOSH (US health exposure limits)
PEL (Permissible)	TWA 100 ppm (860 mg/m^{3})
REL (Recommended)	TWA 100 ppm (860 mg/m^{3})
IDLH (Immediate danger)	2000 ppm
- Except where otherwise noted, data are given for materials in their standard state (at 25 °C [77 °F], 100 kPa). verify (what is ?) Infobox references

Dibromodifluoromethane is a mixed halomethane. It is a colorless non-flammable liquid. Along with Halons 1211, 2402, and 1301, it is one of the most effective fire extinguishers, however, it is also very toxic. It is a class I ozone depleting substance (ODS).

A known use for dibromodifluoromethane is in the synthesis of halfenprox.

== Synthesis ==
Dibromodifluoromethane can be obtained by vapor phase bromination of difluoromethane.

It is also formed during the fluorination of carbon tetrabromide.

== Table of physical properties ==
Property	Value
Density, ρ, at 15 °C (liquid)	2.3063 g/cm^{3}
Critical temperature, T_{c}	198.3 °C, 471.3 K
Critical pressure, p_{c}	4.13 MPa, 40.8 bar
Refractive index, n at 20 °C, D	1.398
Dipole moment	0.7 D
Ozone depletion potential, ODP	0.4, CCl_{3}F is 1
Global warming potential, GWP	231, CO_{2} is 1
