= Isopropyl fluoride =

Names
- Systematic IUPAC name 2-Fluoropropane
- Other names HFC-281ea

Identifiers
| CAS Number | 420-26-8 |
| 3D model (JSmol) | Interactive image |
| Abbreviations | i-PrF iPrF^{i}PrF |
| ChemSpider | 9483 |
| PubChem CID | 9867 |
| CompTox Dashboard (EPA) | DTXSID0073902 |
- InChI: InChI=1S/C3H7F/c1-3(2)4/h3H,1-2H3 Key: PRNZBCYBKGCOFI-UHFFFAOYSA-N
- SMILES: CC(C)F

Properties
| Chemical formula | C_{3}H_{7}F |
| Molar mass | 62.087 g·mol^{−1} |
| Boiling point | −10 °C (14 °F; 263 K) |
- Except where otherwise noted, data are given for materials in their standard state (at 25 °C [77 °F], 100 kPa). Infobox references

Isopropyl fluoride (systematic name 2-fluoropropane) is an organofluorine compound consisting of a propane with a fluorine as substituent on the middle carbon.

This chemical reacts with boron trifluoride to form an ionic complex containing a carbocation that can be used as a catalyst for isomerization and disproportionation of alkanes. Isopropyl fluoride can be synthesized by hydrohalogenation of propene or by substitution of isopropyl alcohol using standard fluorination reagents such as hydrogen fluoride–pyridine. As a refrigerant, it is in the hydrofluorocarbon class, identified as HFC-281ea. It has an atmospheric lifetime of 27 days.
