= Ozone depletion potential =

Relative amount of degradation to the ozone layer a compound causes

The ozone depletion potential (ODP) of a chemical compound is the relative amount of degradation to the ozone layer it can cause, with trichlorofluoromethane (R-11 or CFC-11) being fixed at an ODP of 1.0. Chlorodifluoromethane (R-22), for example, has an ODP of 0.05. CFC 11, or R-11 has the maximum potential amongst chlorocarbons because of the presence of three chlorine atoms in the molecule.

The first proposal of ODP came from Wuebbles in 1983. It was defined as a measure of destructive effects of a substance compared to a reference substance.

Precisely, ODP of a given substance is defined as the ratio of global loss of ozone due to the given substance to the global loss of ozone due to CFC-11 of the same mass.

ODP can be estimated from the molecular structure of a given substance. Chlorofluorocarbons have ODPs roughly equal to 1. Brominated substances have usually higher ODPs in range 5–15, because of the more aggressive bromine reaction with ozone. Hydrochlorofluorocarbons have ODPs mostly in range 0.005 - 0.2 due to the presence of the hydrogen which causes them to react readily in the troposphere, therefore reducing their chance to reach the stratosphere where the ozone layer is present. Hydrofluorocarbons (HFC) have no chlorine content, so their ODP is essentially zero. ODP is often used in conjunction with a compound's global warming potential (GWP) as a measure of how environmentally detrimental it can be.

In a broad sense, haloalkanes that contain no hydrogen are stable in the troposphere and decompose only in the stratosphere. Those compounds that contain hydrogen also react with OH radicals and can therefore be decomposed in the troposphere, as well. The ozone depletion potential increases with the heavier halogens since the C-X bond strength is lower. Note the trend of the CClF_{2}-X series in the table below.

== Ozone depleting potential of common compounds ==
Compound	R No.	ODP
Trichlorofluoromethane (CCl_{3}F)	R-11	1.00
1,1,1,2-Tetrafluoroethane (CF_{3}-CH_{2}F)	R-134a	0.000015
Chlorodifluoromethane (CClF_{2}-H)	R-22	0.05
Chlorotrifluoromethane (CClF_{2}-F)	R-13	1.00
Bromotrifluoromethane (CBrF_{3})	Halon 1301	15.9
Dichlorodifluoromethane (CClF_{2}-Cl)	R-12	1.00
Bromochlorodifluoromethane (CClF_{2}-Br)	R-12B1	7.9
Carbon tetrachloride (CCl_{4})	R-10	0.82
Bromochloromethane (CH_{2}BrCl)	Halon 1101	0.12
Nitrous oxide (N_{2}O)	R-744A	0.017
Alkanes (Propane, Isobutane, etc.)		0
Ammonia (NH_{3})	R-717	0
Carbon dioxide (CO_{2})	R-744	0
Nitrogen (N_{2})	R-728	0
