= REFPROP =

Fluid property prediction software

- Developer: National Institute of Standards and Technology (NIST)
- Initial release: 1989; 37 years ago
- Stable release: 10.0 / 2018
- Written in: Fortran
- Platform: x86-64
- Available in: English
- Type: Thermophysical property software
- License: Proprietary
- Website: www.nist.gov/srd/refprop

REFPROP is a software program for the prediction of thermophysical properties of fluids, developed by the National Institute of Standards and Technology (NIST).

The primary component of REFPROP is an equation of state for each implemented fluid. For most pure fluids, the equation of state is obtained by fitting an expression for the Helmholtz free energy to experimental data. This formulation allows the computation of all equilibrium properties of the fluid, such as density, temperature, pressure, sound speed, heat capacity, second virial coefficients, vapor pressures, saturated liquid and vapor densities, enthalpy of vaporization, entropy, and the Joule-Thomson coefficient.

REFPROP also predicts surface tension, viscosity, and thermal conductivity for many fluids, either using extended corresponding states formulations or fluid-specific equations fit directly to experimental data.

Various methods are used to compute the analogous properties of fluid mixtures.

The full list of fluids properties implemented in REFPROP v10.0 can be found in Table 2 of Huber, et al. (2022).

== List of implemented fluids ==
REFPROP v10.0 implements equation of state models for 147 pure fluids, listed in Table 1. Except for F_{3}N, R-13, R-123, and R-152a, all of these are Helmholtz free energy formulations.

REFPROP v10.0 also predicts surface tension, viscosity, and thermal conductivity for most of the listed fluids.

Table 1: List of pure fluids implemented in REFPROP v10.0
Short name	Full name	Short formula	CAS number
1,3-Butadiene	Buta-1,3-diene	C_{4}H_{6}	106-99-0
1-Butyne	But-1-yne	C_{4}H_{6}	107-00-6
1-Pentene	Pent-1-ene	C_{5}H_{10}	109-67-1
2,2-Dimethylbutane	2,2-Dimethylbutane	C_{6}H_{14}	75-83-2
2,3-Dimethylbutane	2,3-Dimethylbutane	C_{6}H_{14}	79-29-8
3-Methylpentane	3-Methylpentane	C_{6}H_{14}	96-14-0
Acetone	Propanone	C_{3}H_{6}O	67-64-1
Acetylene	Ethyne	C_{2}H_{2}	74-86-2
Ammonia	Ammonia	NH_{3}	7664-41-7
Argon	Argon	Ar	7440-37-1
Benzene	Benzene	C_{6}H_{6}	71-43-2
Butane	n-Butane	C_{4}H_{10}	106-97-8
Butene	1-Butene	C_{4}H_{8}	106-98-9
Carbon dioxide	Carbon dioxide	CO_{2}	124-38-9
Carbon monoxide	Carbon monoxide	CO	630-08-0
Carbonyl sulfide	Carbon oxide sulfide	COS	463-58-1
Chlorine	Chlorine	Cl_{2}	7782-50-5
Chlorobenzene	Chlorobenzene	C_{6}H_{5}Cl	108-90-7
cis-Butene	cis-2-Butene	C_{4}H_{8}	590-18-1
Cyclobutene	1-Cyclobutene	C_{4}H_{6}	822-35-5
Cyclohexane	Cyclohexane	C_{6}H_{12}	110-82-7
Cyclopentane	Cyclopentane	C_{5}H_{10}	287-92-3
Cyclopropane	Cyclopropane	C_{3}H_{6}	75-19-4
D4	Octamethylcyclotetrasiloxane	C_{8}H_{24}O_{4}Si_{4}	556-67-2
D5	Decamethylcyclopentasiloxane	C_{10}H_{30}O_{5}Si_{5}	541-02-6
D6	Dodecamethylcyclohexasiloxane	C_{12}H_{36}O_{6}Si_{6}	540-97-6
DEA	2,2'-Iminodiethanol	C_{4}H_{11}NO_{2}	111-42-2
Decane	Decane	C_{10}H_{22}	124-18-5
Deuterium	Deuterium	D_{2}	7782-39-0
Dichloroethane	1,2-Dichloroethane	C_{2}H_{4}Cl_{2}	107-06-2
Diethyl ether	Diethyl ether	C_{4}H_{10}O	60-29-7
Dimethyl carbonate	Dimethyl ester carbonic acid	C_{3}H_{6}O_{3}	616-38-6
Dimethylether	Methoxymethane	C_{2}H_{6}O	115-10-6
Docosane	Docosane	C_{22}H_{46}	629-97-0
Dodecane	Dodecane	C_{12}H_{26}	112-40-3
Ethane	Ethane	C_{2}H_{6}	74-84-0
Ethanol	Ethyl alcohol	C_{2}H_{6}O	64-17-5
Ethylene glycol	1,2-Ethandiol	C_{2}H_{6}O_{2}	107-21-1
Ethyl benzene	Phenylethane	C_{8}H_{10}	100-41-4
Ethylene	Ethene	C_{2}H_{4}	74-85-1
Ethylene oxide	Ethylene oxide	C_{2}H_{4}O	75-21-8
Fluorine	Fluorine	F_{2}	7782-41-4
Heavy water	Deuterium oxide	D_{2}O	7789-20-0
Helium	Helium-4	He	7440-59-7
Heptane	Heptane	C_{7}H_{16}	142-82-5
Hexadecane	Hexadecane	C_{16}H_{34}	544-76-3
Hexane	Hexane	C_{6}H_{14}	110-54-3
Hydrogen	Hydrogen	H_{2}	1333-74-0
Hydrogen chloride	Hydrogen chloride	HCl	7647-01-0
Hydrogen sulfide	Hydrogen sulfide	H_{2}S	7783-06-4
Isobutane	2-Methylpropane	C_{4}H_{10}	75-28-5
Isobutene	2-Methyl-1-propene	C_{4}H_{8}	115-11-7
Isohexane	2-Methylpentane	C_{6}H_{14}	107-83-5
Isooctane	2,2,4-Trimethylpentane	C_{8}H_{18}	540-84-1
Isopentane	2-Methylbutane	C_{5}H_{12}	78-78-4
Krypton	Krypton	Kr	7439-90-9
MD2M	Decamethyltetrasiloxane	C_{10}H_{30}O_{3}Si_{4}	141-62-8
MD3M	Dodecamethylpentasiloxane	C_{12}H_{36}O_{4}Si_{5}	141-63-9
MD4M	Tetradecamethylhexasiloxane	C_{14}H_{42}O_{5}Si_{6}	107-52-8
MDM	Octamethyltrisiloxane	C_{8}H_{24}O_{2}Si_{3}	107-51-7
MEA	Ethanolamine	C_{2}H_{7}NO	141-43-5
Methane	Methane	CH_{4}	74-82-8
Methanol	Methanol	CH_{4}O	67-56-1
Methyl linoleate	Methyl(Z,Z)-9,12-octadecadienate	C_{19}H_{34}O_{2}	112-63-0
Methyl linolenate	Methyl(Z,Z,Z)-9,12,15-octadecatrienoate	C_{19}H_{32}O_{2}	301-00-8
Methyl oleate	Methylcis-9-octadecenoate	C_{19}H_{36}O_{2}	112-62-9
Methyl palmitate	Methyl hexadecanoate	C_{17}H_{34}O_{2}	112-39-0
Methyl stearate	Methyl octadecanoate	C_{19}H_{38}O_{2}	112-61-8
Methyl cyclohexane	Methylcyclohexane	C_{7}H_{14}	108-87-2
MM	Hexamethyldisiloxane	C_{6}H_{18}OSi_{2}	107-46-0
m-Xylene	1,3-Dimethylbenzene	C_{8}H_{10}	108-38-3
Neon	Neon	Ne	7440-01-9
Neopentane	2,2-Dimethylpropane	C_{5}H_{12}	463-82-1
Nitrogen	Nitrogen	N_{2}	7727-37-9
Nitrogen trifluoride	Nitrogen trifluoride	F_{3}N	7783-54-2
Nitrous oxide	Dinitrogen monoxide	N_{2}O	10024-97-2
Nonane	Nonane	C_{9}H_{20}	111-84-2
Novec649,1230	1,1,1,2,2,4,5,5,5-Nonafluoro-4-(trifluoromethyl)-3-pentanone	C_{6}F_{12}O	756-13-8
Octane	Octane	C_{8}H_{18}	111-65-9
Orthohydrogen	Orthohydrogen	H_{2}	-
Oxygen	Oxygen	O_{2}	7782-44-7
o-Xylene	1,2-Dimethylbenzene	C_{8}H_{10}	95-47-6
Parahydrogen	Parahydrogen	H_{2}	-
Pentane	Pentane	C_{5}H_{12}	109-66-0
Perfluorobutane	Decafluorobutane	C_{4}F_{10}	355-25-9
Perfluorohexane	Tetradecafluorohexane	C_{6}F_{14}	355-42-0
Perfluoropentane	Dodecafluoropentane	C_{5}F_{12}	678-26-2
Propadiene	1,2-Propadiene	C_{3}H_{4}	463-49-0
Propane	Propane	C_{3}H_{8}	74-98-6
Propyl cyclohexane	n-Propyl cyclohexane	C_{9}H_{18}	1678-92-8
Propylene	Propene	C_{3}H_{6}	115-07-1
Propylene oxide	1,2-Epoxy propane	C_{3}H_{6}O	75-56-9
Propyne	Propyne	C_{3}H_{4}	74-99-7
p-Xylene	1,4-Dimethylbenzene	C_{8}H_{10}	106-42-3
R11	Trichlorofluoromethane	CCl_{3}F	75-69-4
R1123	Trifluoroethylene	C_{2}HF_{3}	359-11-5
R113	1,1,2-Trichloro-1,2,2-trifluoroethane	C_{2}Cl_{3}F_{3}	76-13-1
R114	1,2-Dichlorotetrafluoroethane	C_{2}Cl_{2}F_{4}	76-14-2
R115	Chloropentafluoroethane	C_{2}ClF_{5}	76-15-3
R116	Hexafluoroethane	C_{2}F_{6}	76-16-4
R12	Dichlorodifluoromethane	CCl_{2}F_{2}	75-71-8
R1216	Hexafluoropropene	C_{3}F_{6}	116-15-4
R1224yd(Z)	(Z)-1-Chloro-2,3,3,3-tetrafluoropropene	C_{3}HClF_{4}	111512-60-8
R123	2,2-Dichloro-1,1,1-trifluoroethane	C_{2}HCl_{2}F_{3}	306-83-2
R1233zd(E)	trans-1-Chloro-3,3,3-trifluoro-1-propene	C_{3}H_{2}ClF_{3}	102687-65-0
R1234yf	2,3,3,3-Tetrafluoroprop-1-ene	C_{3}F_{4}H_{2}	754-12-1
R1234ze(E)	trans-1,3,3,3-Tetrafluoropropene	C_{3}F_{4}H_{2}	29118-24-9
R1234ze(Z)	cis-1,3,3,3-Tetrafluoropropene	C_{3}F_{4}H_{2}	29118-25-0
R124	1-Chloro-1,2,2,2-tetrafluoroethane	C_{2}HClF_{4}	2837-89-0
R1243zf	3,3,3-Trifluoropropene	C_{3}H_{3}F_{3}	677-21-4
R125	Pentafluoroethane	C_{2}HF_{5}	354-33-6
R13	Chlorotrifluoromethane	CClF_{3}	75-72-9
R1336mzz(Z)	(Z)-1,1,1,4,4,4-Hexafluoro-2-butene	C_{4}H_{2}F_{6}	692-49-9
R134a	1,1,1,2-Tetrafluoroethane	C_{2}H_{2}F_{4}	811-97-2
R13I1	Trifluoroiodomethane	CF_{3}I	2314-97-8
R14	Tetrafluoromethane	CF_{4}	75-73-0
R141b	1,1-Dichloro-1-fluoroethane	C_{2}H_{3}Cl_{2}F	1717-00-6
R142b	1-Chloro-1,1-difluoroethane	C_{2}H_{3}ClF_{2}	75-68-3
R143a	1,1,1-Trifluoroethane	C_{2}H_{3}F_{3}	420-46-2
R152a	1,1-Difluoroethane	C_{2}H_{4}F_{2}	75-37-6
R161	Fluoroethane	C_{2}H_{5}F	353-36-6
R21	Dichlorofluoromethane	CHClF	75-43-4
R218	Octafluoropropane	C_{3}F_{8}	76-19-7
R22	Chlorodifluoromethane	CHClF_{2}	75-45-6
R227ea	1,1,1,2,3,3,3-Heptafluoropropane	C_{3}HF_{7}	431-89-0
R23	Trifluoromethane	CHF_{3}	75-46-7
R236ea	1,1,1,2,3,3-Hexafluoropropane	C_{3}H_{2}F_{6}	431-63-0
R236fa	1,1,1,3,3,3-Hexafluoropropane	C_{3}H_{2}F_{6}	690-39-1
R245ca	1,1,2,2,3-Pentafluoropropane	C_{3}H_{3}F_{5}	679-86-7
R245fa	1,1,1,3,3-Pentafluoropropane	C_{3}H_{3}F_{5}	460-73-1
R32	Difluoromethane	CH_{2}F_{2}	75-10-5
R365mfc	1,1,1,3,3-Pentafluorobutane	C_{4}H_{5}F_{5}	406-58-6
R40	Methyl chloride	CH_{3}Cl	74-87-3
R41	Fluoromethane	CH_{3}F	593-53-3
RC318	Octafluorocyclobutane	C_{4}F_{8}	115-25-3
RE143a	Methyl trifluoromethyl ether	C_{2}H_{3}F_{3}O	421-14-7
RE245cb2	Methyl pentafluoroethyl ether	C_{3}H_{3}F_{5}O	22410-44-2
RE245fa2	2,2,2-Trifluoroethyl-difluoromethyl-ether	C_{3}H_{3}F_{5}O	1885-48-9
RE347mcc(HFE7000)	1,1,1,2,2,3,3-Heptafluoro-3methoxypropane	C_{4}H_{3}F_{7}O	375-03-1
Sulfur dioxide	Sulfur dioxide	O_{2}S	7446-09-5
Sulfur hexafluoride	Sulfur hexafluoride	SF_{6}	2551-62-4
Toluene	Methylbenzene	C_{7}H_{8}	108-88-3
trans-Butene	trans-2-Butene	C_{4}H_{8}	624-64-6
Undecane	Undecane	C_{11}H_{24}	1120-21-4
Vinyl chloride	Chloroethylene	C_{2}H_{3}Cl	75-01-4
Water	Water	H_{2}O	7732-18-5
Xenon	Xenon	Xe	7440-63-3

== See also ==
- Process engineering
- Prediction of viscosity
- Prediction of thermal conductivity
- Viscosity models for mixtures
- Theorem of corresponding states
- Departure function
- The International Association for the Properties of Water and Steam
