= Potassium trifluoroacetate =

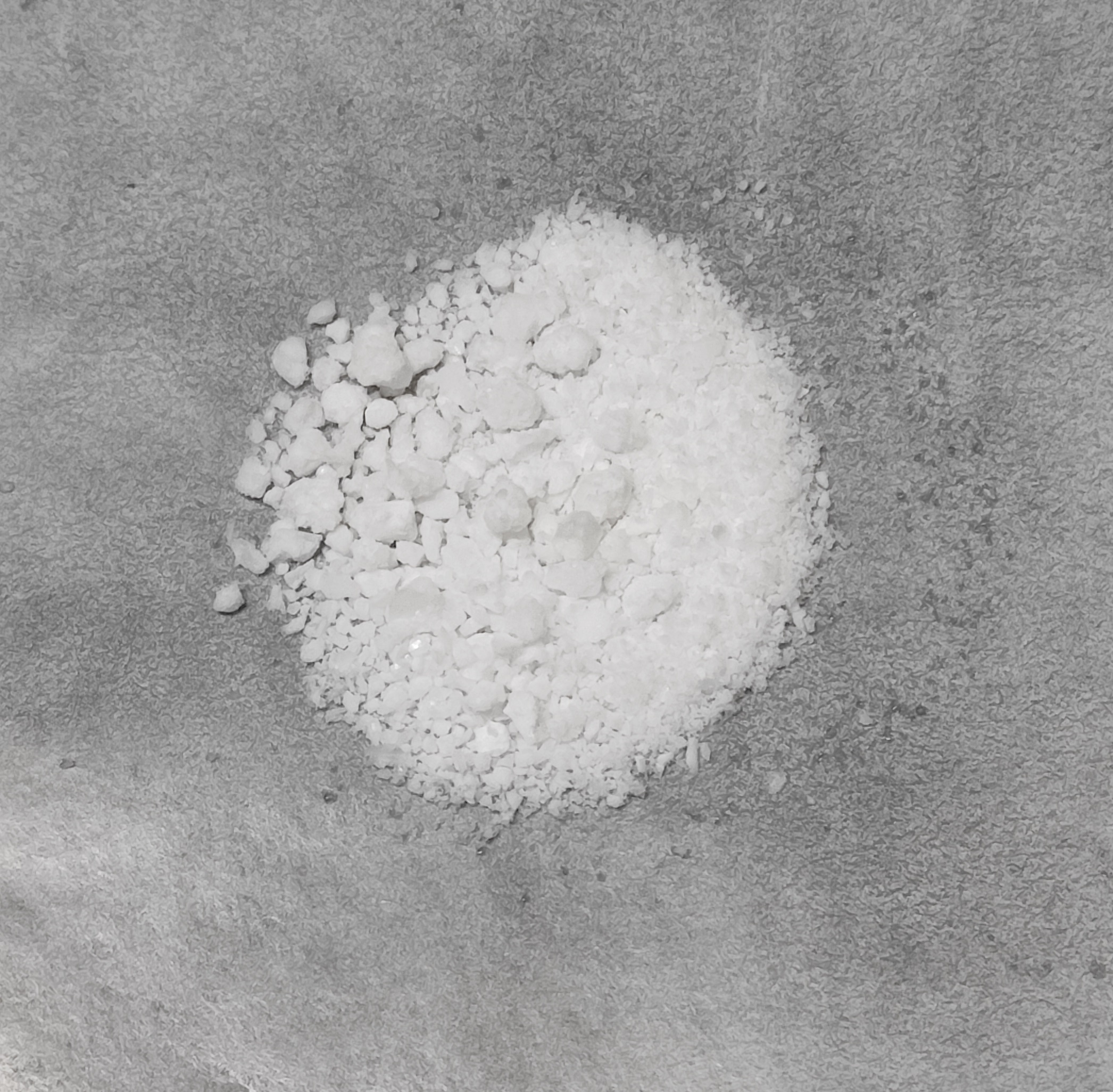

Identifiers
CAS Number	2923-16-2
3D model (JSmol)	Interactive image
ChemSpider	2015056
ECHA InfoCard	100.018.980
EC Number	220-877-5
PubChem CID	23662811
UNII	3C6W4RK9EJ
CompTox Dashboard (EPA)	DTXSID00951841
- InChI: InChI=1S/C2HF3O2.K/c3-2(4,5)1(6)7;/h(H,6,7);/q;+1/p-1 Key: CUNPJFGIODEJLQ-UHFFFAOYSA-M
- SMILES: C(=O)(C(F)(F)F)[O-].[K+]

Properties
Chemical formula	CF_{3}COOK
Melting point	135–137 °C (408–410 K)
Boiling point	145 °C (418 K)

Hazards
- GHS labelling
Pictograms	(GHS06: Toxic) (GHS09: Environmental hazard)
Signal word	Danger
Hazard statements	H300, H400, H412
Precautionary statements	P264, P270, P273, P301+P316, P321, P330, P391, P405, P501

Related compounds
Other anions	Potassium difluorobromoacetate
Other cations	Sodium trifluoroacetate
- Except where otherwise noted, data are given for materials in their standard state (at 25 °C [77 °F], 100 kPa). Infobox references

Potassium trifluoroacetate is the trifluoroacetate salt of potassium, with the chemical formula CF_{3}COOK. It can form an acid salt KH(CF_{3}COO)_{2}.

== Preparation and properties ==
Potassium trifluoroacetate can be obtained by reacting trifluoroacetic acid with potassium hydroxide, potassium carbonate or potassium bicarbonate.

CF_{3}COOH + KOH → CF_{3}COOK + H_{2}O

It can decompose when heated and reaches the maximum decomposition rate at 220 °C. The products are potassium fluoride and some volatile products, such as carbon dioxide, carbon monoxide, trifluoroacetyl fluoride, etc.
