= Spray foam =

Building material

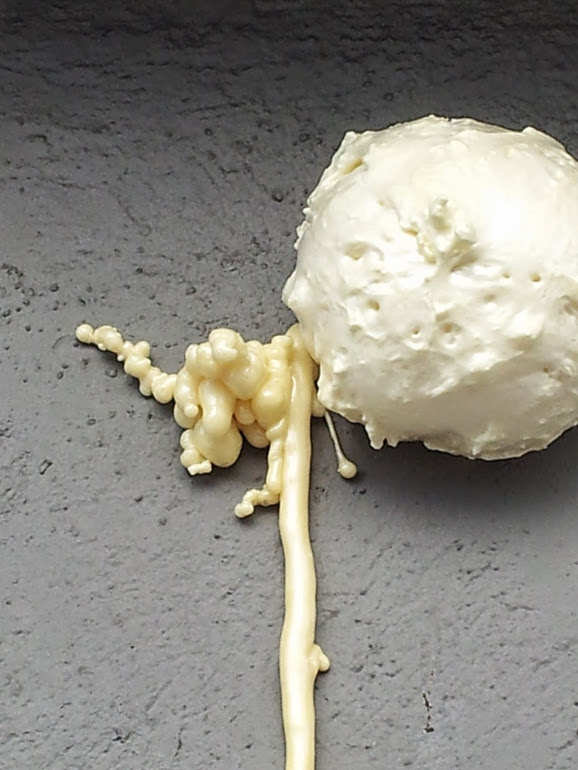
Spray foam insulation extruding from a duct.

Spray foam (expanding foam in the UK) is a chemical product used in construction and engineering primarily as insulation and as a filler material. It is produced as a liquid but quickly expands and hardens into a stiff, lightweight structure. It is created by a chemical reaction of two component parts, commonly referred to as side A and side B. Side A contains very reactive chemicals known as isocyanate. Side B contains a polyol, which reacts with isocyanates to make polyurethane, and a mixture of other chemicals, including catalysts (which help the reaction to occur), flame retardant, blowing agents and surfactants. These react when mixed with each other and expand up to 30-60 times its liquid volume after it is sprayed in place. This expansion makes it useful as a specialty packing material which forms to the shape of the product being packaged and produces a high thermal insulating value with virtually no air infiltration.

== History ==
Otto Bayer (1902–1982) is credited with the invention of polyurethane in 1937. He succeeded in synthesizing polyurethane foam by exploring his basic idea that mixing small volumes of chemical substances could create dry foam materials.

Polyurethane was further developed for different applications, ranging from shoe soles and cushions to industrial uses. In the 1940s rigid foam was applied to airplanes, and in 1979 polyurethane began being used as building insulation.

== Properties ==
=== Thermal resistance ===
R-value is the term given to thermal resistance to heat flow. The higher the R-value of an insulation product, the more effective the insulation properties. Spray polyurethane foam comes in a range of densities and cell structure. Low density foams are referred to as open cell SPF while higher density foams are referred to as closed cell foam. 1.8-2 pound polyurethane foam has the highest R-value of readily available spray foam insulation used in homes and buildings.

Polyurethane is a closed-cell foam insulation material that initially contains a low-conductivity gas in its cells. As a result of the high thermal resistance of the gas, spray polyurethane insulation typically has an initial R-value around R-3.4 to R-6.7 per inch. In comparison, glass wool typically has an R-Value of only R-3 to R-4 per inch.

Foam insulation blocks all three forms of heat transfer:

Conductive heat transfer
The flow of thermal energy through a substance from a higher to a lower temperature region. Foam thermoset plastics reduce conductive heat transfer due in part to having very loose molecular bonds; In addition the cells of the installed spray foam are either filled with air in the case of open cell foam or HFCs (365mfc, 227ea, 245fa) or H(C)FOs (1336mzz(Z)), 1233zd(E)) in closed cell foam.

Radiant heat transfer
The process by which heat energy in the form of light (usually IR unless the substrate is hot enough to glow in the visible range) is emitted more strongly by warm surfaces and absorbed by other materials especially those of low IR reflectivity (think matte black finish). Radiant heat transfer does not require a medium. Foam insulation materials, such as spray foam insulation, are opaque to thermal radiation, like most solid materials.

Convective heat transfer
Heat which is created elsewhere that is transported by means of a fluid, such as water or in our case air. Spray foam insulation's most important attribute is the ability to air seal creating a custom airtight envelope within the building structure. The added benefit to air sealing is the ability to block convective heat transfer from interior to exterior during heating months and vice versa during cooling months, as the heat cannot escape through gaps in the buildings envelope without the aid of air movement from infiltration as a means of transport.

== Applications ==
=== Packaging applications ===
Spray foam is a very specialized packing material, often required for use in shipping valuable fragile items. Engineered packaging principles are designed to protect sculptures, vases, large fossils, lamp bases, busts, computers, furniture, chandeliers and other objects of unusual shape. By virtue of the liquid foam expanding by up to 30-60 times the volume of its liquid state, it efficiently protects almost any size, form and weight.

The custom fit of the molds, top and bottom, securely and uniformly cushions the object. There are many types of alternative materials that can be used to handle more specific needs.

=== Building applications ===
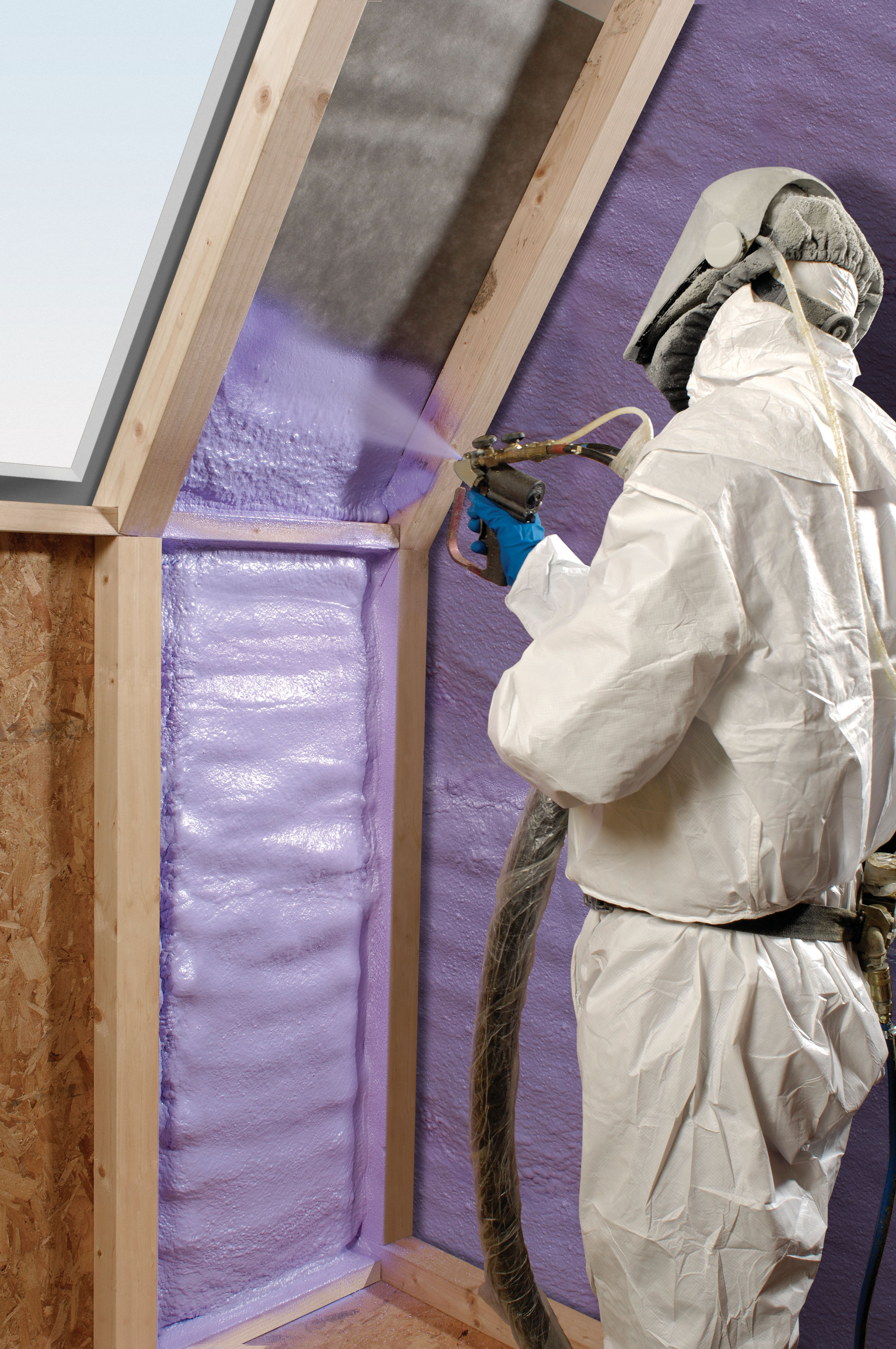
Walltite Insulation foam being sprayed

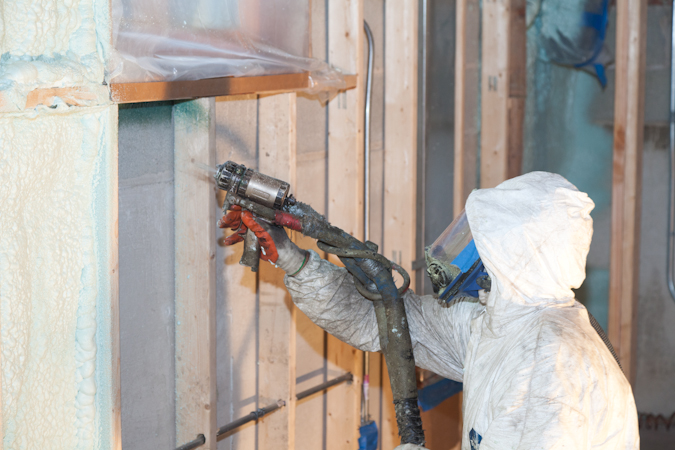
Closed cell spray foam being applied by trained installer.

Spray foam insulation or spray polyurethane foam (SPF) is an alternative to traditional building insulation such as fiberglass. A two-component mixture composed of isocyanate and polyol resin comes together at the tip of a gun, and forms an expanding foam that is sprayed onto roof tiles, concrete slabs, into wall cavities, or through holes drilled into a cavity of a finished wall.

Closed-cell polyurethane (PU) foam is widely regarded as a versatile material and is employed in a range of applications beyond conventional wall and roof insulation. It is commonly used to insulate roofs, floors, windows, and walls, as well as containers, boats, crawl spaces, and basements. In addition to providing thermal resistance, it can help to prevent condensation on windows and walls, reduce noise transmission by filling hollow spaces, and minimise thermal bridging. Owing to its dense structure, closed-cell PU foam is also frequently applied to seal cracks and construction joints, contributing both to air tightness and structural integrity.

"Spray foam" is also an informal term used to refer to various plastic foam materials that are used in building construction to provide thermal insulation and minimize air infiltration. Polyurethane and polyisocyanurate are two types of foam used in this application.

==== Types ====
Spray polyurethane foam (SPF) insulation can be categorized into two different types: light-density open-cell spray foam insulation and medium-density closed-cell spray foam insulation. Both types of SPF are thermoset cellular plastics comprising millions of small cells.

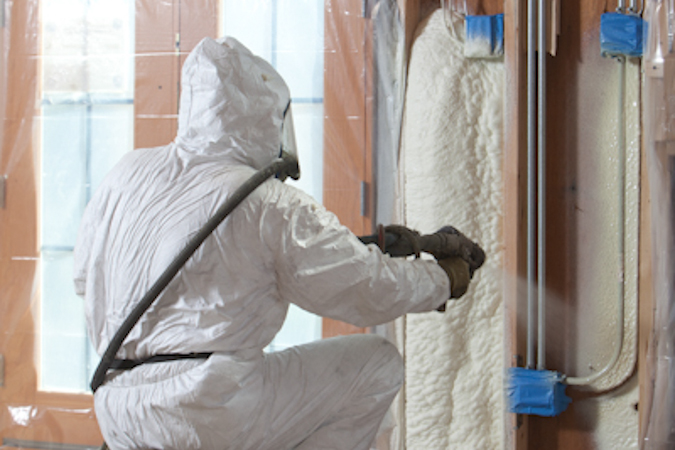
Open cell spray polyurethane foam insulation being applied in wall cavities.

Open cell insulation can be crushed by hand and has a lower insulation value. Closed cell is rigid to the touch and each air cell is completely sealed. While closed cell foam has a higher R-value, it is more costly to buy.

Medium-density closed-cell spray foam (ccSPF)

Medium-density closed-cell foam insulation is often referred to as two pound (2 lb) foam. It is a rigid insulating material with a Long Term Thermal Resistance (LTTR) R-value that ranges between 5.1 and 6 per inch When the required minimum thickness of 50 mm is installed, ccSPF is both a vapour barrier and an air barrier.

In Canada, the National Building Code references two standards that apply to the manufacturing and installation of ccSPF: the CAN/ULC S705.1 Material Standard and the CAN/ULC S705.2 National Application Standard. The installation standard requires that all installers of ccSPF in Canada be licensed and carry a photo ID card.

Typically the foam's natural colour is yellow, however in Canada all ccSPF that have CCMC listings are required to have a unique colour for field identification.

Light-density open-cell spray foam (ocSPF)

Light-density open-cell SPF is commonly known as half-pound foam. It is a semi-rigid material with a sponge-like appearance that expands during installation and creates small, open cells that are filled with carbon dioxide. Due to its ability to expand during the application process, it fills cracks, crevices and voids and adheres to irregular surfaces or substrates to form an air sealing insulation.

While the R value will vary, most ocSPF products have an R value of around 3.8 per inch. Unlike medium-density closed-cell SPF, thinner layers of ocSPF are not particularly effective as vapour barrier because the air infiltrates through the open cell structure. However, when installed at 5.5 inches or more, ocSPF does act as an air barrier. It is often used for interior walls because it provides sound reduction by blocking and absorbing air leakage. It is usually only recommended for indoor applications.

==== Application methods ====
===== Asia =====
A type of use quite familiar in South East Asian countries is applying the foam by spraying it against the bottom of roof tiles under high pressure with a spray gun. A hard but flexible layer of rigid foam is then created and seals all the tiles to each other and to the steel structure.

This spraying method, especially very popular in Thailand, is used not only against heavy leaks but helps also as insulation against the enormous heat the roofs constantly face.

This tropical heat causes the steel substructure that supports many roofs in that part of the world, to continuously expand and contract, changing slightly the position of the tiles resting on top of them. This displacement eventually creates small openings between the tiles and the substructure, through which rainwater can seep, creating leaks that can damage the plastered ceilings, electric wiring, and other components of the building supporting the roof.

===== Europe =====
Since 24 August 2023, EU regulations require that all industrial and professional users of polyurethane (PU) products receive training and certification in the safe handling of materials containing diisocyanates.

Some 150,000 properties have been treated with polyurethane foam insulation in the UK. There are systems which have British Board of Agrément approval for use in existing and new build applications and can show compliance to UK building regulations. However, if applied incorrectly or in damp spaces, spray foam insulation can trap moisture and destroy the roof. As a result, very few mortgage lenders in the UK will offer a loan to buy or to refinance any home that has any spray foam insulation, especially the closed-cell type.

Closed-cell spray foam is also commonly employed in specialist applications such as insulating boats, van conversions, cabins, and outbuildings. Its ability to provide both thermal resistance and moisture protection makes it suitable for environments exposed to fluctuating temperatures and humidity.

===== North America =====
The Canadian National Building Code references the CAN/ULC S705.2 National Application Standard which must be followed during all installations of 2lb medium density closed cell polyurethane foam. Every installer of CAN/ULC-S705.1 compliant medium density, spray applied foam must be licensed in order to spray foam and hold valid photo ID issued by their Quality Assurance Program (QAP) provider showing their license is in good standing.

The United States has adapted to using sprayfoam insulation and a new technology called Wall Injection to retrofit existing wall construction by drilling small holes between wall studs in the structures framing and filling the void with a less aggressive expanding water-based foam. This allows existing home and business owners to conserve energy by creating a thermal envelope in their existing structure.

==== Benefits ====
Spray foam insulation, like other insulation, saves on energy costs and lowers utility bills. Studies by the US Department of Energy show that 40% of a home's energy is lost as the result of air infiltration through walls, windows and doorways. Buildings treated with spray foam insulation insulate as much as 50% better than traditional insulation products.

Insulation properly deployed can be part of a system designed to protect against moisture, which provides the benefit of reducing the chance of harmful mold, mildew and rotting of wood.

In addition to building temperature and moisture control, spray foam insulation is often used to reduce noise. Foam insulation serves as a barrier to airborne sounds, and reduces airborne sound transfer through a building's roof, floor and walls compared an uninsulated structure.

In the United States, homes treated with spray foam insulation often qualify for state and federal tax deductions.

Insulation of all types stops a good deal of energy loss. Some types including spray foams also seal air leaks. Insulation can also save energy in hot climates by reducing air conditioning use.

== Blowing agent history and climate impact ==
Most closed-cell spray foam was formed using hydrofluorocarbon (HFC) blowing agents that have high global warming potential, partially or completely offsetting the climate benefits of the energy savings they can offer. Global treaties such as the Montreal Protocol, Kyoto Protocol, Kigali Amendment, and Paris Climate Agreement all include requirements for phasing out and substituting less environmentally friendly blowing agents. In the United States, a 2015 rule under the United States Environmental Protection Agency's (EPA) Significant New Alternatives Policy (SNAP) programme regulated the phase-out of certain high-GWP blowing agents and the transition to lower-GWP goods. The rule increased the alternatives list and restricted the use of high-GWP hydrofluorocarbons (HFCs) in foam blowing.

A few spray foam suppliers have started supplying spray foam blown with hydrofluoroolefin (HFO) blowing agents without this problem as of early 2017. Alternative foam blowing agents that are free of chlorofluorocarbons (CFCs), hydrochlorofluorocarbons (HCFCs), and hydrofluorocarbons (HFCs) are based on methyl formate.

== Health effects ==
Spray foam insulation is typically non-toxic only after it has cured. While curing, spray foam emits a gas that causes blurred vision and trouble breathing. Using full face and respiratory protection while applying the product is recommended.

Isocyanates are powerful irritants to the eyes and gastrointestinal as well as the respiratory tracts. Direct skin contact with isocyanates can also cause marked inflammation. Some people say that their eyes feel like they have sand in them at the onset of problems. Some break out in a rash on their arms, chest, and neck.

Overexposure to isocyanates can sensitize workers, making them subject to asthma attacks if they are exposed again. Respiratory irritation may progress to a chemical bronchitis. Additional exposures can make the onset easier with less isocyanate necessary to start the attack.

Sporadic cases of hypersensitivity pneumonitis (HP) have also been reported in workers exposed to isocyanates. The symptoms may seem like the flu, with fever, muscle aches, and headaches. Other symptoms may include a dry cough, chest tightness, and difficult breathing. Individuals with chronic HP often experience progressively more difficult breathing, fatigue, and weight loss. Individuals with acute HP typically develop symptoms 4–6 hours after exposure.

Curing times of new generation spray foam insulation are very short. Once cured the foam is completely inert and non toxic.

== See also ==
- Building insulation materials
- Insulation (list of insulation material)
- R-value (insulation)
