= Trans-1,3,3,3-Tetrafluoropropene =

trans-1,3,3,3-Tetrafluoropropene

Names
- Preferred IUPAC name (1E)-1,3,3,3-Tetrafluoroprop-1-ene
- Other names R-1234ze(E); HFO-1234ze(E); trans-1,3,3,3-tetrafluoro-1-propene; trans-1,3,3,3-tetrafluoropropylene; trans-1,3,3,3-tetrafluoroprop-1-ene

Identifiers
CAS Number	29118-24-9
3D model (JSmol)	Interactive image
ChemSpider	4647426
ECHA InfoCard	100.238.116
EC Number	471-480-0
PubChem CID	5708720
UNII	5I2481UOO8
CompTox Dashboard (EPA)	DTXSID10885446
- InChI: InChI=1S/C3H2F4/c4-2-1-3(5,6)7/h1-2H/b2-1+ Key: CDOOAUSHHFGWSA-OWOJBTEDSA-N; InChI=1/C3H2F4/c4-2-1-3(5,6)7/h1-2H/b2-1+ Key: CDOOAUSHHFGWSA-OWOJBTEDBQ
- SMILES: F[C@H]=CC(F)(F)F

Properties
Chemical formula	C_{3}H_{2}F_{4}
Molar mass	114.043 g·mol^{−1}
Appearance	Colorless gas
Melting point	−156 °C (−249 °F; 117 K)
Boiling point	−19 °C (−2 °F; 254 K)
Critical point (T, P)	109.4 °C, 36.36 bar
Solubility in water	0.373 g/L
Vapor pressure	703 kPa at 310 K
- Except where otherwise noted, data are given for materials in their standard state (at 25 °C [77 °F], 100 kPa). verify (what is ?) Infobox references

trans-1,3,3,3-Tetrafluoropropene, HFO-1234ze(E-isomer), is a hydrofluoroolefin that has the same chemical formula as HFO-1234ze(Z-isomer) and one of many tetrafluoropropene isomers. The HFO-1234ze E-isomer is considered the more useful for refrigeration applications as compared to the HFO-1234ze Z-isomer. It was developed as a "fourth generation" refrigerant intended to replace R-134a, as a blowing agent for foam and aerosol applications, in air horns and gas dusters, and planned use in metered-dose inhalers.

== Properties ==
The structure of trans-1,3,3,3-tetrafluoropropene was investigated both in the gas state (gas electron diffraction) and in the crystalline phase (X-ray diffraction). In the crystal, it aggregates via C-H---F contacts from 2.44(1) to 2.63(1) Å. Combustion experiments with trans-1,3,3,3-tetrafluoropropene produce carbon dioxide, carbonyl fluoride and hydrogen fluoride as the main combustion products. The determination of the flammability range leads to the classification of trans-1,3,3,3-tetrafluoropropene as a highly flammable gas.

== Production ==
Catalytic dehydrofluorination of HFC-245fa produces a mixture of both E and Z-isomers of R-1234; by adjusting the catalyst Z-isomer concentration varies between 15% to 23%.

Dehydrofluorination of liquid phase HFC-245fa using aqueous solutions of caustic or other strong bases produces a mixture of both E and Z-isomers of R-1234; by adjusting the reaction temperature varies the Z-isomer concentration between 13% to 15%.

The E-isomer is considered the most useful for refrigeration applications so after separation of the E-isomer from the Z-isomer in the above listed processes, the Z-isomer can be isomerized to the E-isomer in a separate step or the Z-isomer can be converted back to HFC-245fa by adding hydrogen fluoride in a separate step. Once returned to HFC-245fa, the above production steps repeated to increase the volume of desired E-isomer.

== Uses ==
Given the relatively high(>150) global warming potential(GWP) of most of the hydro-fluoro-carbons (HFCs), several actions are ongoing in different countries to reduce the use of these fluids. For example, the European Union's 2104 F-Gas regulation specifies the mandatory GWP values of the refrigerants to be used as working fluids in almost all air conditioners and refrigeration machines beginning in 2020.

Both synthetic and natural replacement candidate refrigerants have been proposed so far, but among synthetic options, hydro-fluoro-olefins (HFOs) are appearing the most promising to achieve low(<150) GWP thus far.

HFO-1234ze(E) has been adopted as a working fluid in chillers, heat pumps, and supermarket refrigeration systems. There are also plans to use it as a propellant in metered-dose inhalers.

It has been demonstrated that HFO-1234ze(E) can not be considered as a drop-in replacement of HFC-134a. In fact, from a thermodynamic point of view, it can be stated that:

– The theoretical coefficients of performance of HFO-1234ze(E) is slightly lower than HFC-134a;

– HFO-1234ze(E) has a different volumetric cooling capacity when compared to HFC-134a.

– HFO-1234ze(E) has saturation pressure drops higher than HFC-134a during two-phase heat transfer under the constraint of achieving the same heat transfer coefficient.

So, from a technological point of view, modifications to the condenser and evaporator designs and to compressor displacement are needed to achieve the same cooling capacity and energetic performance of HFC-134a.

== Environmental impact ==
The use of R-134a is being phased out because of its high GWP. HFO-1234ze(E) itself has zero ozone-depletion potential (ODP=0), a very low global warming potential (GWP < 1 ), even lower than CO_{2}, and it is classified by ANSI/ASHRAE as class A2L refrigerant (lower flammability (see below) and lower toxicity).

In open atmosphere however, it has been suggested in a UNSW study that HFO-1234ze can form HFC-23 as one of its secondary atmospheric breakdown products. HFC-23 is a very potent greenhouse gas with a GWP100 of 14,800. This could make the secondary GWP of R-1234ze in the range of 1,400±700 considering the amount of HFC-23 which may form from HFO-1234ze in the atmosphere. The findings of the study are however contradicted in industry sponsored papers.

Besides the global warming potential, when HFOs decompose in the atmosphere, trifluoroacetic acid (TFA) is formed, which also remains in the atmosphere for several days. The trifluoroacetic acid then forms sodium trifluoroacetate, a salt of trifluoroacetic acid, in water and on the ground. Due to high polarity and low degradability, it is difficult to remove TFA salts from drinking water (ICPR 2019). However, the amount of TFA salts potentially generated in applications such as metered-dose inhalers has been estimated to be negligible.

== See also ==
- 2,3,3,3-Tetrafluoropropene (HFO-1234yf)
