= 1-Chloro-3,3,3-trifluoropropene =

Names
- Preferred IUPAC name 1-Chloro-3,3,3-trifluoroprop-1-ene
- Other names 1-Chloro-3,3,3-trifluoropropene; HCFO-1233zd; HCFC-1233zd r-1233zd Solstice zd (Honeywell brand name)

Identifiers
| CAS Number | 2730-43-0 mixture of E- and Z- isomers; 102687-65-0 E-isomer; 99728-16-2 Z-isomer |
| 3D model (JSmol) | Interactive image |
| ChemSpider | 10331370 mixture of E- and Z- isomers; 4647642 E-isomer; 9833033 Z-isomer |
| ECHA InfoCard | 100.215.615 |
| PubChem CID | 2779022 mixture of E- and Z- isomers; 5709018 E-isomer; 11658298 Z-isomer |
| UNII | 4B96DT2BYB |
| CompTox Dashboard (EPA) | DTXSID70950023 |
- InChI: mixture of E- and Z- isomers: InChI=1S/C3H2ClF3/c4-2-1-3(5,6)7/h1-2H Key: LDTMPQQAWUMPKS-UHFFFAOYSA-N; E-isomer: InChI=1S/C3H2ClF3/c4-2-1-3(5,6)7/h1-2H/b2-1+ Key: LDTMPQQAWUMPKS-OWOJBTEDSA-N; Z-isomer: InChI=1S/C3H2ClF3/c4-2-1-3(5,6)7/h1-2H/b2-1- Key: LDTMPQQAWUMPKS-UPHRSURJSA-N
- SMILES: FC(F)(F)C=CCl

Properties
| Chemical formula | C_{3}H_{2}ClF_{3} |
| Molar mass | 130.49 g·mol^{−1} |
| Appearance | Colorless liquid |
| Boiling point | 39.6 °C (Z); 18.5 °C (E) |
- Except where otherwise noted, data are given for materials in their standard state (at 25 °C [77 °F], 100 kPa). Infobox references

1-Chloro-3,3,3-trifluoropropene (HFO-1233zd) is the unsaturated chlorofluorocarbon with the formula HClC=C(H)CF_{3}. The compound exists as E- (trans-) and Z- (cis-) isomers. The cis- isomer of this colorless gas is of interest as a more environmentally friendly (lower GWP; global warming potential) refrigerant in air conditioners. The trans-isomer is of interest as a more environmentally friendly (lower GWP; global warming potential) solvent.

== Production ==
It can be prepared by fluorination and dehydrohalogenation/dehydrochlorination reactions starting with 1,1,1,3,3-pentachloropropane or 1,1,3,3-tetrachloropropane using the below steps:

1. In a liquid phase reactor, HFC-240fa (or 1,1,3,3-tetrachloropropene and derivatives such as 1,3,3,3-tetrachloropropene) are converted to HF in the presence of a catalyst forming a mixture of 245fa, 244fa, 1234ze, and 1233zd;
2. Removal of HCl and HF.
3. In a liquid or gas phase reactor, the organic mixture is reacted with HCl in the presence of a catalyst to convert unsaturated olefins to alkanes.
4. Isolating and purifying the HFC-245fa product
5. HFO-243fa and HFO-244fa are dehydrochlorinated with a caustic solution in the liquid phase or with a catalyst in the vapor phase to form HFO-1233zd and trans-1234ze(E-isomer).
6. Isolation and purifying the HFO-1233zd product into its isomers.
