= C3H2F4 =

The molecular formula C_{3}H_{2}F_{4} (molar mass: 114.04 g/mol, exact mass: 114.0093 u) may refer to:

- Various isomers of tetrafluoropropene, sometimes used as refrigerants
- Various isomers of tetrafluorocyclopropane
