= Tetrafluoropropene =

Tetrafluoropropene, also called tetrafluoropropylene, has the following isomers:

- 1,1,2,3-tetrafluoropropene (HFO-1234yc)
- 1,1,3,3-tetrafluoropropene (HFO-1234zc)
- cis-1,2,3,3-tetrafluoropropene (HFO-1234ye(Z))
- trans-1,2,3,3-tetrafluoropropene (HFO-1234ye(E))
- cis-1,3,3,3-tetrafluoropropene (HFO-1234ze(Z))
- trans-1,3,3,3-tetrafluoropropene (HFO-1234ze(E))
- 2,3,3,3-tetrafluoropropene (HFO-1234yf)

This is a gaseous phase effluent from the decomposition of Teflon when laser cutting it.
