= 1,3,3,3-Tetrafluoropropene =

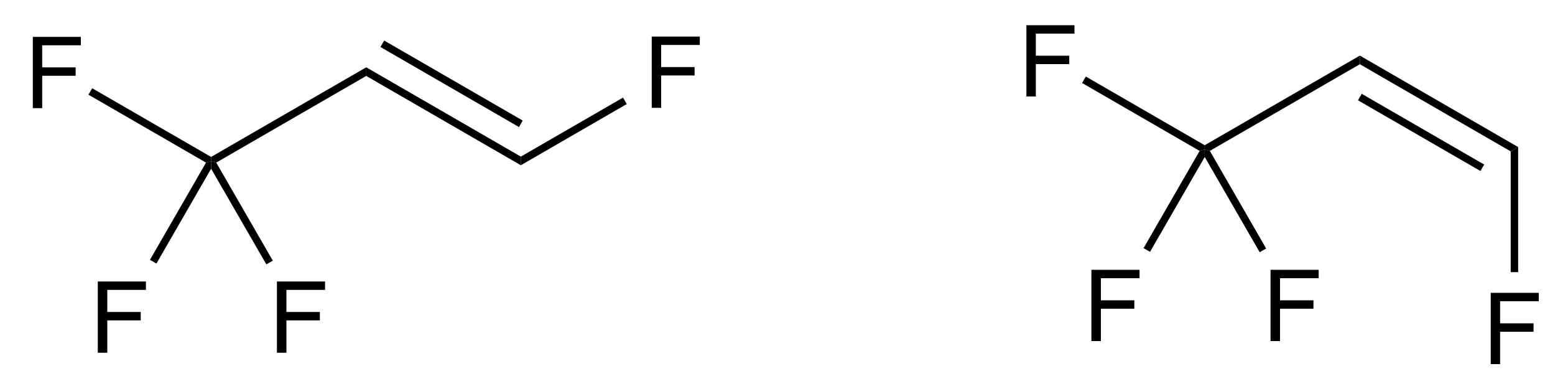

Names
- Preferred IUPAC name 1,3,3,3-Tetrafluoroprop-1-ene
- Other names 1,3,3,3-tetrafluoro-1-propene; 1,3,3,3-tetrafluoropropylene; 1,3,3,3-tetrafluoroprop-1-ene

Identifiers
CAS Number	1645-83-6
3D model (JSmol)	Interactive image
ChemSpider	2057039
ECHA InfoCard	100.214.545
EC Number	688-097-1
PubChem CID	2776729
CompTox Dashboard (EPA)	DTXSID60936952
- InChI: InChI=1S/C3H2F4/c4-2-1-3(5,6)7/h1-2H Key: CDOOAUSHHFGWSA-UHFFFAOYSA-N
- SMILES: C(=CF)C(F)(F)F

Properties
Chemical formula	C_{3}H_{2}F_{4}
Molar mass	114.043 g·mol^{−1}
Boiling point	−16 °C (3 °F; 257 K)
- Except where otherwise noted, data are given for materials in their standard state (at 25 °C [77 °F], 100 kPa). Infobox references

1,3,3,3-Tetrafluoropropene is a hydrofluoroolefin which has two isomers:

- cis-1,3,3,3-tetrafluoropropene.
- trans-1,3,3,3-tetrafluoropropene, used as a refrigerant (R-1234ze(E).)
