= Flufenacet =

Names
- Preferred IUPAC name N-(4-Fluorophenyl)-N-(propan-2-yl)-2-{[5-(trifluoromethyl)-1,3,4-thiadiazol-2-yl]oxy}acetamide
- Other names Fluthiamide; Thiafluamide

Identifiers
CAS Number	142459-58-3
3D model (JSmol)	Interactive image
ChemSpider	77944
ECHA InfoCard	100.127.787
PubChem CID	86429
UNII	OL44PP5145
CompTox Dashboard (EPA)	DTXSID2032552
- InChI: InChI=1S/C14H13F4N3O2S/c1-8(2)21(10-5-3-9(15)4-6-10)11(22)7-23-13-20-19-12(24-13)14(16,17)18/h3-6,8H,7H2,1-2H3 Key: IANUJLZYFUDJIH-UHFFFAOYSA-N; InChI=1/C14H13F4N3O2S/c1-8(2)21(10-5-3-9(15)4-6-10)11(22)7-23-13-20-19-12(24-13)14(16,17)18/h3-6,8H,7H2,1-2H3 Key: IANUJLZYFUDJIH-UHFFFAOYAX
- SMILES: CC(C)N(c1ccc(cc1)F)C(=O)COc2nnc(s2)C(F)(F)F

Properties
Chemical formula	C_{14}H_{13}F_{4}N_{3}O_{2}S
Molar mass	363.33 g·mol^{−1}
- Except where otherwise noted, data are given for materials in their standard state (at 25 °C [77 °F], 100 kPa). Infobox references

Flufenacet is an oxyacetanilide herbicide applied before crops have emerged. It was registered for use in the United States in 1998 and the European Union in 2004.

== Mode of action ==
Flufenacet is related to the chloroacetamide class of herbicides and has the same mode of action through inhibiting the germination of seeds by inhibiting very long chain fatty acid synthesis.

In the model plant Arabidopsis thaliana it causes similar symptoms to the fiddlehead mutant.

== Usage ==
Flufenacet usage in England

In temperate Europe, flufenacet is commonly used in cereal crops to control grass weeds such as black-grass (Alopecurus myosuroides) that have evolved resistance to other herbicides and is applied in combination with other herbicides including pendimethalin, diflufenican, flurtamone, metribuzin and aclonifen. As of 2019 in the United Kingdom, resistance to flufenacet had begun to be found in black-grass and rye-grass. As of 2022 it was the most widely applied herbicide and third most widely applied pesticide in England, being used on 2.9 million hectares.

== Environmental fate ==
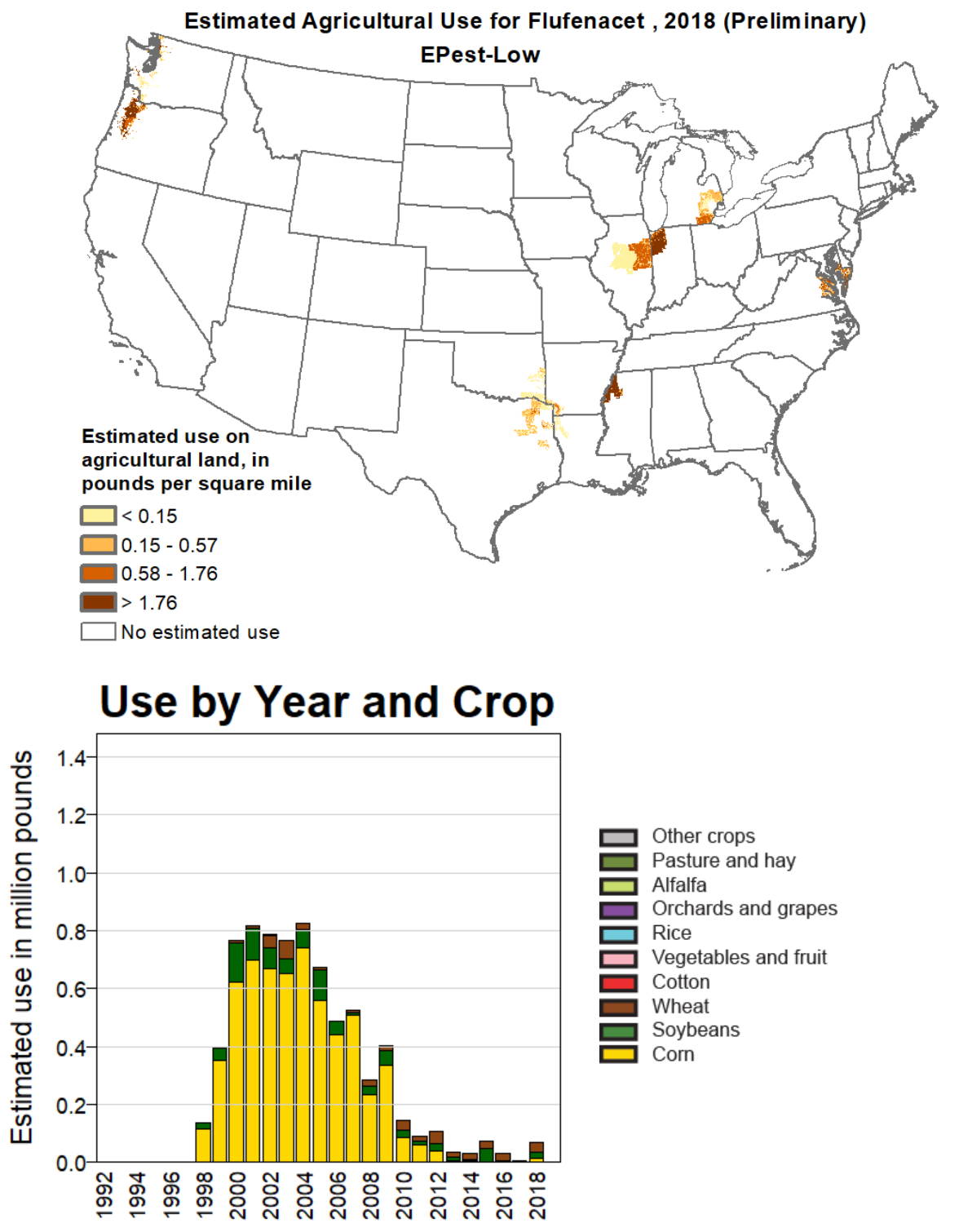
Map of the estimated use of the herbicide flufenacet in the United States in 2018 and graph showing annual use since 1992

Flufenacet and its metabolites can be classified as PFAS substances, or so-called "forever chemicals". They break down to produce trifluoroacetic acid (TFA), a persistent substance that pollutes groundwater.

== Toxicity ==
In September 2024, the European Food Safety Authority has concluded that flufenacet is an endocrine disruptor of humans and wild mammals via the thyroid (T)-modality. The active substance falls under the exclusion criteria of the Plant Protection Products Regulation. Re-authorisation of the active substance by the EU Commission is therefore no longer possible. The EU Commission will draw up a proposal for the non-authorisation of flufenacet, including withdrawal and sunset periods, which the EU member states are expected to vote on in spring 2025. In March 2025, the EU agreed to ban flufenacet, effective from June 2025, but with the option for individual states to allow use for a further year.

== Synthesis ==
Flufenacet can be obtained by reacting equivalent amounts of 2-methylsulfonyl-5-trifluoromethyl-1,3,4-thiadiazole with 2-hydroxy[N-(4-fluoropheny)-N-isopropyl]acetamide in the presence of sodium hydroxide in acetone.

Synthesis
