= Sodium trichloroacetate =

Names
- Preferred IUPAC name Sodium trichloroacetate

Identifiers
CAS Number	650-51-1
3D model (JSmol)	Interactive image
ChemSpider	12073
ECHA InfoCard	100.010.437
EC Number	211-479-2
PubChem CID	23681045
RTECS number	AJ9100000
UNII	2N76A3BRJ0
CompTox Dashboard (EPA)	DTXSID6034924
- InChI: Key: SAQSTQBVENFSKT-UHFFFAOYSA-M; InChI=1S/C2HCl3O2.Na/c3-2(4,5)1(6)7;/h(H,6,7);/q;+1/p-1
- SMILES: C(C(=O)[O-])(Cl)(Cl)Cl.[Na+]

Properties
Chemical formula	C_{2}Cl_{3}NaO_{2}
Molar mass	185.36 g·mol^{−1}
Appearance	White powder
Density	~1.5 g/mL^{−1}
Melting point	200 °C (392 °F; 473 K)
Boiling point	Decomposes
Solubility in water	55 g / 100 ml
Solubility	Soluble in methanol and ethanol, slightly soluble in acetone, not soluble in ethers and hydrocarbons
Acidity (pK_{a})	0.7 (conjugate acid)

Hazards
- Occupational safety and health (OHS/OSH)
Main hazards	Corrosive
- GHS labelling
Pictograms	(GHS07: Exclamation mark) (GHS09: Environmental hazard)
Signal word	Warning
Hazard statements	H335, H410
Precautionary statements	P261, P271, P273, P304+P340, P312, P391, P403+P233, P405, P501
NFPA 704 (fire diamond)	3 1 1
Flash point	Non-flammable
Autoignition temperature	Non-flammable

Related compounds
Other anions	Sodium trifluoroacetate
Other cations	Trichloroacetic acid
Related compounds	Sodium chloroacetate Sodium acetate
- Except where otherwise noted, data are given for materials in their standard state (at 25 °C [77 °F], 100 kPa). Infobox references

Sodium trichloroacetate is a chemical compound with a formula of CCl_{3}CO_{2}Na. It is a colorless, water-soluble solid.

== Preparation ==
Sodium trichloroacetate is made by the neutralization of trichloroacetic acid with sodium hydroxide:

CCl_{3}CO_{2}H + NaOH → CCl_{3}CO_{2}Na + H_{2}O

== Reactions ==
Sodium trichloroacetate is a weaker base than sodium acetate because of the electron-withdrawing nature of the trichloromethyl group. Sodium trifluoroacetate is likewise an even weaker base. Sodium trichloroacetate can easily be protonated with suitably strong acids:

CCl_{3}CO^{−}_{2} + H_{2}SO_{4} → CCl_{3}CO_{2}H + HSO^{−}_{4}

Heating induces decarboxylation and hydrolysis, yielding chloroform and sodium bicarbonate: CCl_{3}CO_{2}Na + H_{2}O → HCCl_{3} + NaHCO_{3}

Under anhydrous conditions, thermal decarboxylation produces the trichloromethyl anion, which is a sufficiently nucleophilic to add to carbonyl functional groups in aldehydes, carboxylic acid anhydrides, ketones, and acyl halides. It is thus a precursor for the Jocic–Reeve reaction.

== Applications ==
Sodium trichloroacetate is a commercial herbicide. It is also used in the dye industry.

In the laboratory, it is used to increase sensitivity and precision during transcript mapping.

== Safety ==
Its use as a herbicide is regulated. The compound has a halflife of week in soils. It is of modest toxicity, with an LD50 (oral, rats) of grams/kg.

== See also ==
- Sodium chloroacetate
