= Frédéric Swarts =

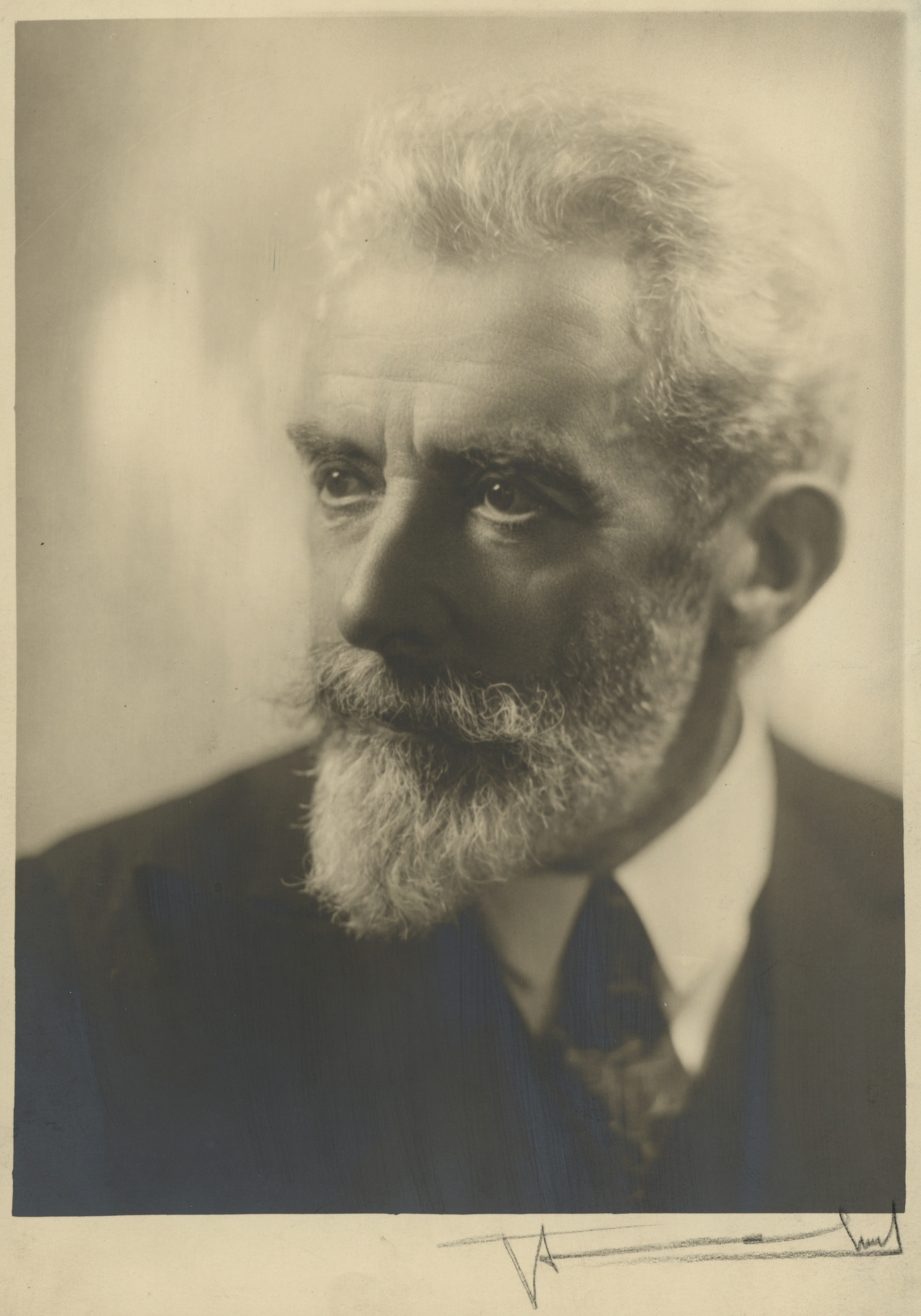
Frédéric Swarts

Frédéric Jean Edmond Swarts (2 September 1866 – 6 September 1940) was a Belgian chemist who prepared the first chlorofluorocarbon, CF_{2}Cl_{2} (Freon-12) as well as several other related compounds. He was a professor of civil engineering at the University of Ghent. In addition to his work on organofluorine chemistry, he authored the textbook "Cours de Chimie Organique." He was the son of Theodore Swarts (chemist, *1839 Antwerpen; †1911 Kortenberg, Belgium) and a colleague of Leo Baekeland. He is also known for developing Swarts Reaction which is used to form alkyl fluorides from alkyl halides with the help of fluorine metal salts.
