= Swarts fluorination =

Named after	Frédéric Jean Edmond Swarts

Swarts fluorination is a process whereby the chlorine atoms in a compound – generally an organic compound, but experiments have been performed using silanes – are replaced with fluorine, by treatment with antimony trifluoride in the presence of chlorine or of antimony pentachloride. Some metal fluorides are particularly more useful than others, including silver(I) fluoride, mercurous fluoride, cobalt(II) fluoride and aforementioned antimony.

Heating the mixture of the metal fluoride and the haloalkane (chlorine and bromine are replaced readily) yields the desired fluoroalkane. In some particularly reactive cases, heating is unnecessary; shaking or stirring the reaction mixture is sufficient. This reaction has a good yield.

The process was initially described by Frédéric Jean Edmond Swarts in 1892.

== Mechanism ==
The active species is antimony trifluorodichloride 2, which is produced in situ from the reaction between antimony trifluoride 1 and chlorine; this compound can also be produced in bulk, according to a patent of John Weaver. This then undergoes a halogen exchange with a haloalkane (here Trichloro(ethyl)silane), as in 3, replacing the halogen atom (here chlorine) with fluorine and affording the fluorinated product 4.
