= Sodium trifluoroacetate =

Chemical compound

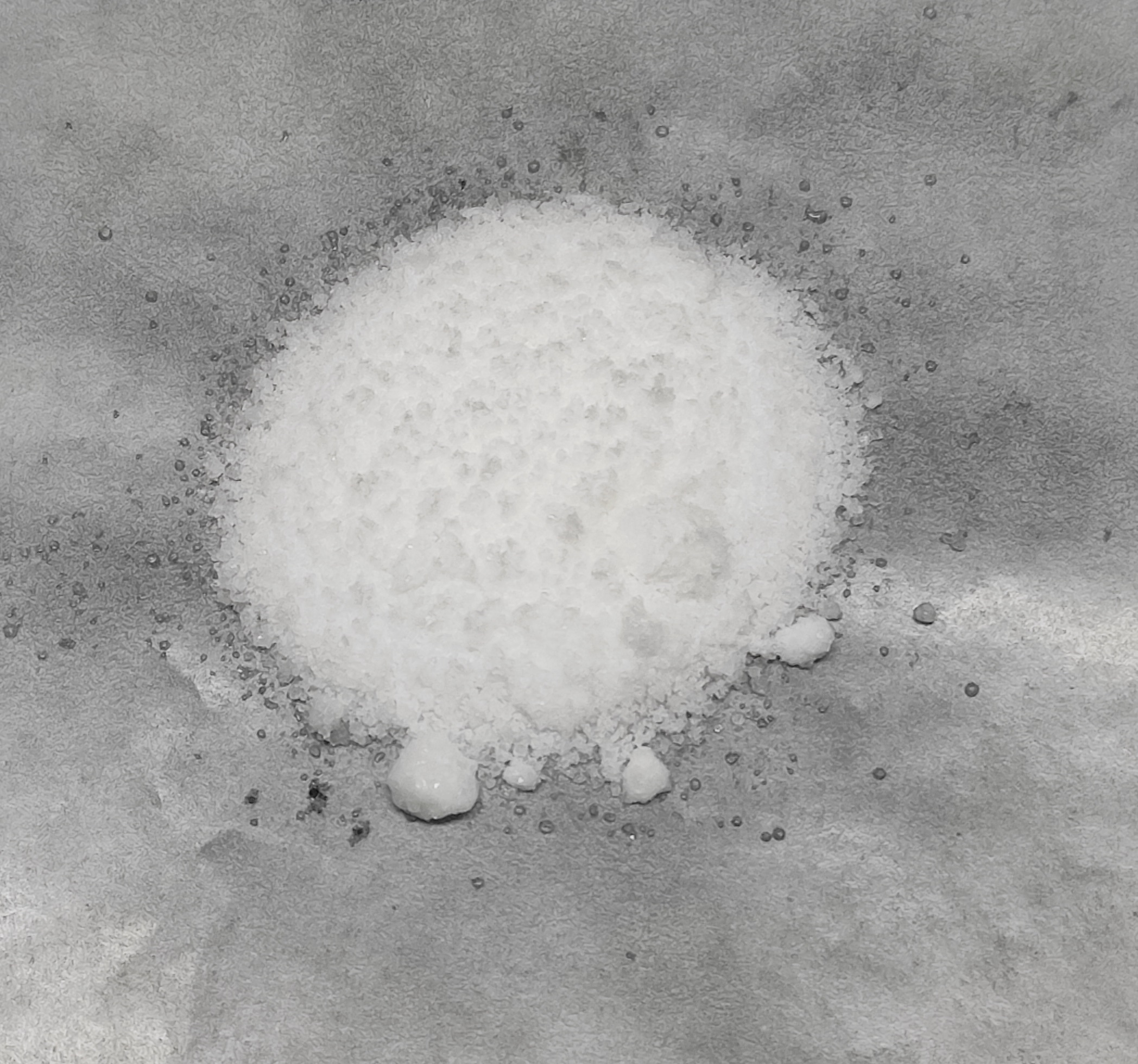

Names
- IUPAC name Sodium trifluoroacetate
- Other names Sodium perfluoroacetate Sodium 2,2,2-trifluoroacetate

Identifiers
CAS Number	2923-18-4
3D model (JSmol)	Interactive image
ChemSpider	68703
ECHA InfoCard	100.018.982
EC Number	220-879-6
PubChem CID	517019
UNII	255JUV5YVI
CompTox Dashboard (EPA)	DTXSID0062715
- InChI: Key: UYCAUPASBSROMS-UHFFFAOYSA-M; InChI=1S/C2HF3O2.Na/c3-2(4,5)1(6)7;/h(H,6,7);/q;+1/p-1
- SMILES: C(C(=O)[O-])(F)(F)F.[Na+]

Properties
Chemical formula	C_{2}F_{3}NaO_{2}
Molar mass	136.005 g·mol^{−1}
Appearance	White crystalline powder
Density	1.49 g mL^{−1}
Melting point	207 °C (405 °F; 480 K)
Boiling point	Decomposes
Solubility in water	625 g/L
Solubility	soluble in alcohol, acetonitrile, dimethylformamide and most of polar organic solvents
Acidity (pK_{a})	0.23 (conjugate acid)

Hazards
- Occupational safety and health (OHS/OSH)
Main hazards	Toxic, Irritant, Harmful to environment
- GHS labelling
Pictograms	(GHS06: Toxic) (GHS07: Exclamation mark) (GHS09: Environmental hazard)
Signal word	Danger
Hazard statements	H300, H315, H319, H335, H410
Precautionary statements	P261, P264, P270, P271, P273, P280, P301+P310, P302+P352, P304+P340, P305+P351+P338, P312, P321, P330, P332+P313, P337+P313, P362, P391, P403+P233, P405, P501
NFPA 704 (fire diamond)	2 0 1
Flash point	Non-flammable
Autoignition temperature	Non-flammable

Related compounds
Other anions	Sodium trichloroacetate
Other cations	Lithium trifluoroacetate Potassium trifluoroacetate
Related compounds	Sodium formate
- Except where otherwise noted, data are given for materials in their standard state (at 25 °C [77 °F], 100 kPa). Infobox references

Sodium trifluoroacetate is a chemical compound with a formula of CF_{3}CO_{2}Na. It is the sodium salt of trifluoroacetic acid. It is used as a reagent in synthetic organic chemistry.

== Basicity ==
With a pK_{a} of 0.23 for trifluoroacetic acid, the trifluoroacetate ion is an extremely weak base compared to acetic acid, which has a pK_{a} of 4.76. This is due to the electron-withdrawing effect of the three fluorine atoms adjacent the carboxylate group. Strong acids such as hydrochloric acid or sulfuric acid can protonate the trifluoroacetate ion to trifluoroacetic acid:

CF_{3}CO^{−}_{2} + HCl → CF_{3}CO_{2}H + Cl^{−}

CF_{3}CO^{−}_{2} + H_{2}SO_{4} → CF_{3}CO_{2}H + HSO^{−}_{4}

In general, trifluoroacetate reacts in equilibrium with hydronium cations to form trifluoroacetic acid:

CF_{3}CO^{−}_{2} + H_{3}O^{+} $\ce{<=>>}$ CF_{3}CO_{2}H + H_{2}O

The general reaction with hydronium is in equilibrium due to the similarity in pK_{a} between trifluoroacetic acid and the hydronium ion.

== Preparation ==
One convenient method is by dissolving an equivalent amount of sodium carbonate in a 50% aqueous solution of trifluoroacetic acid. The solution is filtered and evaporated by vacuum evaporation (with special care to avoid decomposition of the salt by overheating). The solid obtained is dried under vacuum at 100 °C.

== Uses ==
Sodium trifluoroacetate is a useful reagent for trifluoromethylation.

The trifluoromethylation process with sodium trifluoroacetate.

== See also ==
- Sodium fluoroacetate
- Trifluoroacetic acid
- Sodium acetate
