= Trifluoroacetate =

Identifiers
CAS Number	14477-72-6
3D model (JSmol)	Interactive image
ChEBI	CHEBI:27110
ChemSpider	76197
Gmelin Reference	82342
PubChem CID	84468
UNII	MH3TVL33EZ
CompTox Dashboard (EPA)	DTXSID60162799
- InChI: InChI=1S/C2HF3O2/c3-2(4,5)1(6)7/h(H,6,7)/p-1 Key: DTQVDTLACAAQTR-UHFFFAOYSA-M
- SMILES: C(=O)(C(F)(F)F)[O-]

Properties
Chemical formula	C_{2}F_{3}O_{2}^{−}
Molar mass	113.016 g·mol^{−1}
Conjugate acid	Trifluoroacetic acid
- Except where otherwise noted, data are given for materials in their standard state (at 25 °C [77 °F], 100 kPa). Infobox references

Trifluoroacetate (CF_{3}CO^{−}_{2}) is a polyatomic ion, the anion that is the conjugate base of trifluoroacetic acid (CF_{3}CO_{2}H).

== Production ==
The salts containing the trifluoroacetate anion can be made by an acid–base reaction between trifluoroacetic acid and a base, such as sodium hydroxide (NaOH) to give sodium trifluoroacetate (CF_{3}COONa):

CF_{3}CO_{2}H + NaOH ⟶ CF_{3}CO_{2}Na + H_{2}O

== Trifluoroacetate as a PFAS ==
Trifluoroacetic acid is one of the shortest possible perfluoroalkyl substances (PFAS). It is suspected to be a persistent pollutant.

== Related compounds ==
- Fluoral
- Trichloroacetic acid
- Acetate
