= Trifluoroacetic acid =

One of the lightest perfluoro compounds

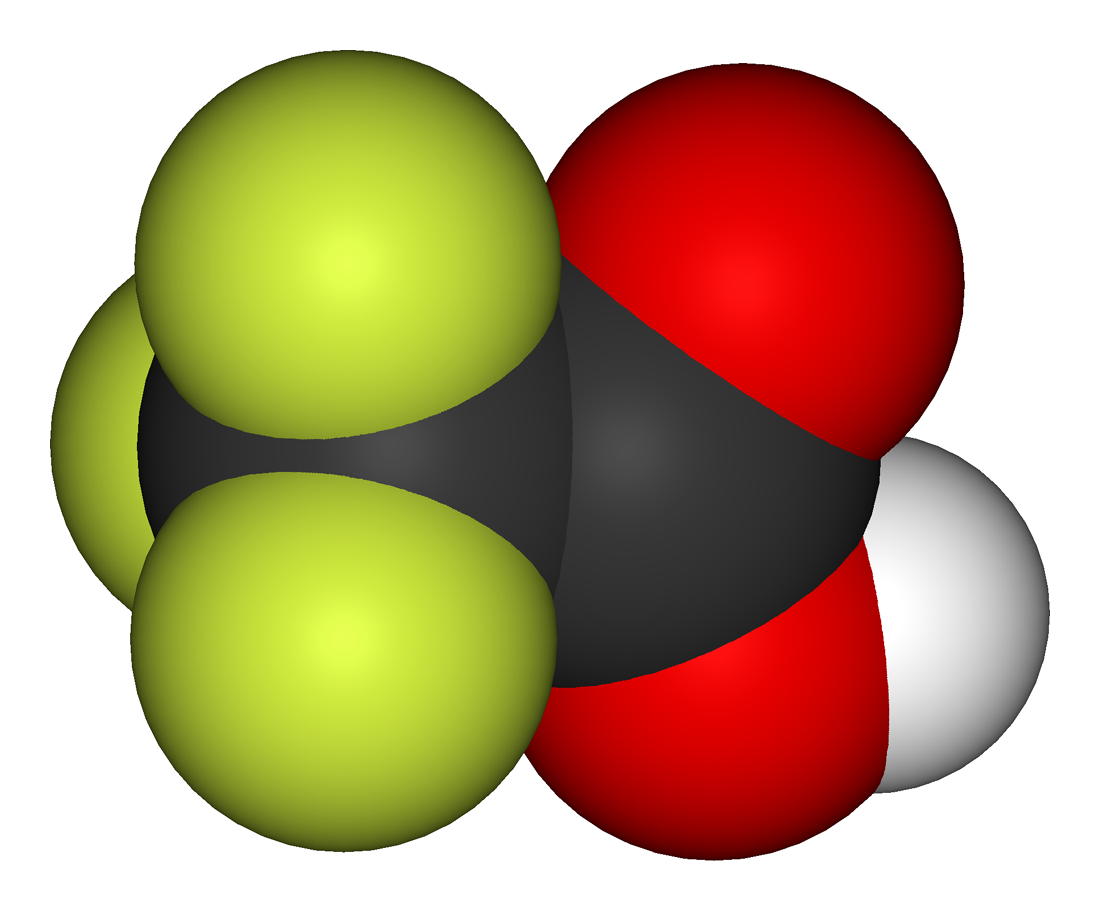

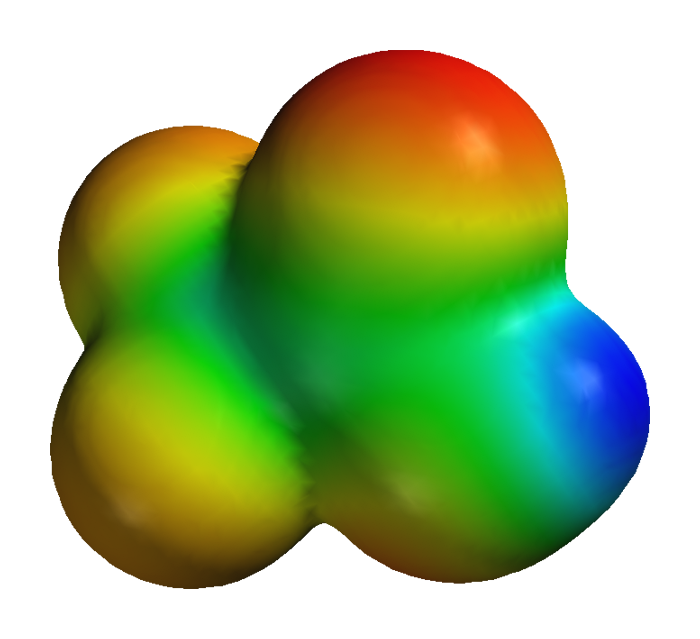

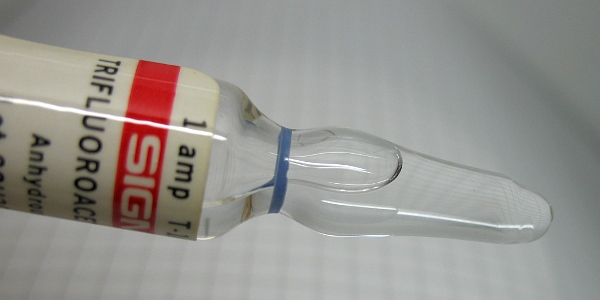

Names
- Preferred IUPAC name trifluoroacetic acid
- Other names 2,2,2-trifluoroacetic acid 2,2,2-trifluoroethanoic acid perfluoroacetic acid trifluoroethanoic acid TFA

Identifiers
CAS Number	76-05-1
3D model (JSmol)	Interactive image
Beilstein Reference	742035
ChEBI	CHEBI:45892
ChEMBL	ChEMBL506259
ChemSpider	10239201
ECHA InfoCard	100.000.846
Gmelin Reference	2729
PubChem CID	6422
RTECS number	AJ9625000
UNII	E5R8Z4G708
CompTox Dashboard (EPA)	DTXSID00881311, DTXSID00893893 DTXSID9041578, DTXSID00881311, DTXSID00893893
- InChI: InChI=1S/C2HF3O2/c3-2(4,5)1(6)7/h(H,6,7) Key: DTQVDTLACAAQTR-UHFFFAOYSA-N; InChI=1/C2HF3O2/c3-2(4,5)1(6)7/h(H,6,7) Key: DTQVDTLACAAQTR-UHFFFAOYAP
- SMILES: FC(F)(F)C(=O)O

Properties
Chemical formula	C_{2}HF_{3}O_{2}
Molar mass	114.023 g·mol^{−1}
Appearance	colorless liquid
Odor	strong and vinegar-like
Density	1.489 g/cm^{3}, 20 °C
Melting point	−15.4 °C (4.3 °F; 257.8 K)
Boiling point	72.4 °C (162.3 °F; 345.5 K)
Solubility in water	miscible
Vapor pressure	0.0117 bar (1.17 kPa) at 20 °C
Acidity (pK_{a})	0.03 ± 0.08
Conjugate base	trifluoroacetate
Magnetic susceptibility (χ)	−43.3·10^{−6} cm^{3}/mol

Hazards
- Occupational safety and health (OHS/OSH)
Main hazards	highly corrosive, persistent groundwater pollutant
- GHS labelling
Pictograms	(GHS05: Corrosive) (GHS07: Exclamation mark)
Signal word	Danger
Hazard statements	H314, H332, H412
Precautionary statements	P260, P264, P271, P273, P280, P301+P330+P331, P303+P361+P353, P304+P312, P304+P340, P305+P351+P338, P310, P312, P321, P363, P405, P501
NFPA 704 (fire diamond)	3 1 1
Safety data sheet (SDS)	External MSDS

Related compounds
Related perfluorinated acids	heptafluorobutyric acid perfluorooctanoic acid perfluorononanoic acid
Related compounds	Acetic acid; Trichloroacetic acid; Tribromoacetic acid; Triiodoacetic acid
- Except where otherwise noted, data are given for materials in their standard state (at 25 °C [77 °F], 100 kPa). Infobox references

Trifluoroacetic acid (TFA) is an organofluorine compound with the chemical formula CF_{3}CO_{2}H. It belongs to the subclass of per- and polyfluoroalkyl substances (PFASs) known as ultrashort-chain perfluoroalkyl acids (PFAAs). TFA, which is only produced industrially, is commonly used in organic chemistry. In the form of its conjugate base trifluoroacetate, it is the most abundant PFAS found in the environment.

It is a haloacetic acid, with all three of the acetyl group's hydrogen atoms replaced by fluorine. It is a colorless liquid with a vinegar-like odor. TFA is a stronger acid than acetic acid is, having an acid ionisation constant, K_{a}, that is approximately 50000 times higher, as the highly electronegative fluorine atoms and consequent electron-withdrawing nature of the trifluoromethyl group weakens the oxygen–hydrogen bond (allowing for greater acidity) and stabilises the anionic conjugate base.

== History ==
In 1922, Frédéric Swarts synthesised trifluoroacetic acid, or rather its sodium salt, and investigated its physicochemical properties.

== Formation ==
TFA is prepared industrially by the electrofluorination of acetyl chloride or acetic anhydride, followed by hydrolysis of the resulting trifluoroacetyl fluoride:

CH_{3}COCl + 4 HF → CF_{3}COF + 3 H_{2} + HCl
CF_{3}COF + H_{2}O → CF_{3}COOH + HF

Wet samples can be dried by addition of trifluoroacetic anhydride.

An older route to TFA proceeds via the oxidation of 1,1,1-trifluoro-2,3,3-trichloropropene with potassium permanganate. The trifluorotrichloropropene can be prepared by Swarts fluorination of hexachloropropene.

=== Via biodegradation of trifluomethyl compounds ===
Trifluoroacetic acid is not produced biologically, but it is a breakdown product of various organofluorine compounds, e.g., the volatile anesthetic agent halothane. It also may be formed by hydroxyl radical-initiated atmospheric oxidation of the commonly used refrigerant 1,1,1,2-tetrafluoroethane (R-134a). Moreover, it is formed as an atmospheric degradation product of almost all fourth-generation synthetic refrigerants, also called hydrofluoroolefins (HFO), such as 2,3,3,3-tetrafluoropropene (R-1234yf).

Trifluoroacetic acid is also formed by the degradation of some pesticides that contain a trifluoromethyl group (-CF_{3}), such as flufenacet. The German Environment Agency estimated that pesticide use releases approximately 500 metric tonnes of TFA annually in Germany alone, while refrigerants account for around 1170 metric tonnes per year.

== Reactions ==
Having a pK_{a} value of around 0, TFA does not exist as such at concentrations found in natural waters. Instead TFA converts to trifluoroacetate, concomitant with the protonation of water.

It protonates several weakly basic anions, e.g. azide to give hydrazoic acid.

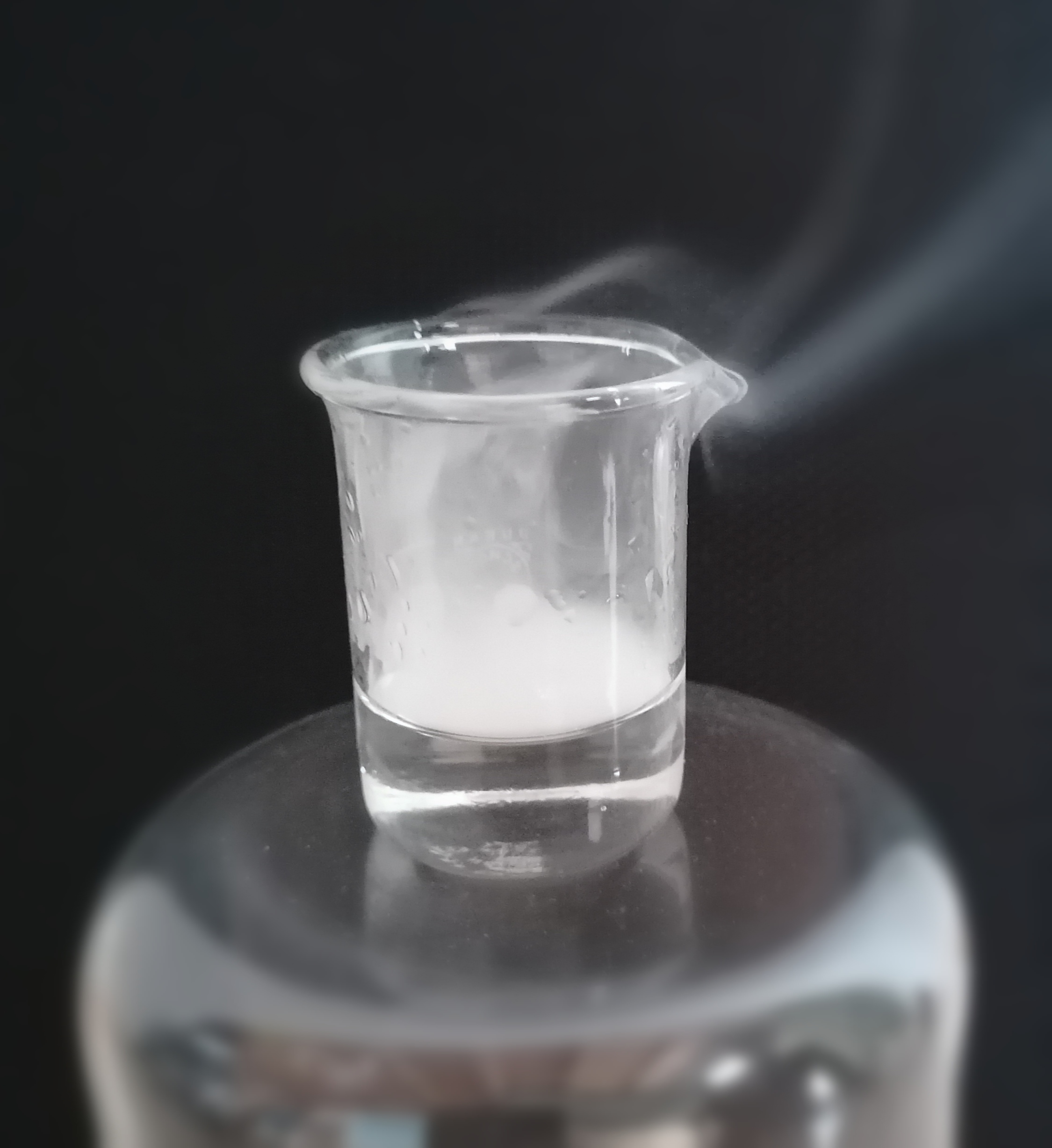
Trifluoroacetic acid in a beaker

TFA is the precursor to trifluoroacetic anhydride, trifluoroperacetic acid, and 2,2,2-trifluoroethanol. It is a reagent used in organic synthesis because of a combination of convenient properties: volatility, solubility in organic solvents, and its strength as an acid. TFA is also less oxidizing than sulfuric acid but more readily available in anhydrous form than many other acids. One complication to its use is that TFA forms an azeotrope with water (b. p. 105 °C).

TFA is used as a strong acid to remove protecting groups such as Boc used in organic chemistry and peptide synthesis.

At a low concentration, TFA is used as an ion pairing agent in liquid chromatography (HPLC) of organic compounds, particularly peptides and small proteins. TFA is a versatile solvent for NMR spectroscopy (for materials stable in acid). It is also used as a calibrant in mass spectrometry.

TFA is used to produce trifluoroacetate salts.

TFA is a high-production chemical and has wide applicationos in organic synthesis, e.g., in rearrangements, functional group deprotections, oxidations, reductions, condensations, hydroarylations, and trifluoromethylations.

== Health effects ==
Trifluoroacetic acid is a strong acid. TFA is harmful when inhaled, causes severe skin burns and is toxic for aquatic organisms even at low concentrations.

Skin burns are severe, heal poorly and can be necrotic. Vapour fumes have an LC_{50} of 10.01 mg/L, tested on rats over 4 hours. Inhalation symptoms include mucus irritation, coughing, shortness of breath and possible formation of oedemas in the respiratory tract. Exposure damages the kidneys.

TFA is also thought to be responsible for halothane-induced hepatitis.

In 2024, the German Federal Institute for Risk Assessment (BfR) formally requested that the European Chemicals Agency (ECHA) reclassify TFA as "presumed" toxic to human reproduction, based on studies showing damage to animal fetuses. In June 2026, ECHA's Risk Assessment Committee (RAC) concluded that TFA fulfils the criteria for toxic to the reproduction class 1B, persistent, mobile and toxic (PMT) as well as very persistent and very mobile (vPvM).

In July 2026, the European Food Safety Authority (EFSA) reduced the acceptable daily intake for TFA by 72%, from 0.05 mg/kg body weight/day down to 0.014. It also set the acute reference dose (ARfD) to 0.07 mg/kg body weight. These reductions were based on an assessment of new evidence, including changes in levels of the hormone thyroxine.

In spring 2026, the European Parliament and the Council of the European Union defined a relative potency factor (RPF) of 0.002 perfluorooctanoic acid (PFOA) equivalents for TFA, while a threshold of 0.0044 µg/L PFOA equivalents for the sum of 25 PFAS (now including TFA) in inland surface water was set.

== Environmental impacts ==
Trifluoroacetic acid is mildly phytotoxic.

Uncertainties remain in our understanding of the potential impacts on the environment of TFA. A debate is ongoing regarding its ecological risk due to its persistence, ubiquity in the environment and increasing concentrations globally. TFA exposure is widespread and increasing and it is the most abundant PFAS found in the environment. TFA does not have well-established health advisories or regulatory limits as other PFAAs.

Trifluoroacetic acid is also formed by the degradation of pesticides that contain a trifluoromethyl group (-CF_{3}), such as flufenacet. Pesticides have been identified as the main source of TFA in water in agricultural areas. In Germany, the annual TFA emissions originating from fluorinated plant protection products are estimated at 400 to 500 t.

Trifluoroacetic acid degrades very slowly in the environment and has been found in increasing amounts as a contaminant in water, soil, food, and the human body. Median concentrations of a few micrograms per liter have been found in beer and tea. Seawater can contain about 200 ng of TFA per liter. Biotransformation by decarboxylation to fluoroform has been discussed. In October 2024, a publication proposed classifying TFA as a planetary boundary threat, similar to how CFCs are treated.

It is estimated that the TFA emissions resulting from the atmospheric degradation of volatile TFA-precursors, such as HCFCs, HFCs, HFOs, and HCFOs, released in Europe (EU-28) will rise exponentially from approx. 9 kt (2015) to approx. 40 kt (2030).

=== Water contamination in Europe ===
TFA has emerged as a significant environmental contaminant across European waterways since its discovery in 2016 by researchers at the Karlsruhe Water Technology Center in Germany. Unlike other PFAS compounds, TFA's high water solubility allows it to spread rapidly through rivers and precipitation rather than binding to soil or organic matter.

TFA concentrations in European water sources have increased markedly since the 1990s. German and Swiss studies documented an approximately fivefold increase in TFA levels in rainfall since the 1990s, while Danish groundwater showed more than tenfold increases over the same period. Research by the anti-pesticide network PAN Europe found that TFA accounted for 98 percent of all PFAS detected in water samples from 10 EU countries. Groundwater contamination with TFA is also widespread in Switzerland.

The contamination has proven extremely difficult to address due to TFA's resistance to conventional water treatment methods. The only effective removal technique is reverse osmosis, which is prohibitively expensive and wastes up to 25 percent of treated water while producing concentrated brine that requires indefinite containment.

== See also ==
- Fluoroacetic acid – highly toxic but naturally occurring rodenticide CH_{2}FCOOH
- Difluoroacetic acid
- Trichloroacetic acid, the chlorinated analog
- Trifluoroacetone – also abbreviated TFA
- Triflic acid
