= Trifluoroacetyl fluoride =

Names
- Preferred IUPAC name 2,2,2-trifluoroacetyl fluoride

Identifiers
CAS Number	13709-33-6
3D model (JSmol)	Interactive image
ChemSpider	61035
ECHA InfoCard	100.005.963
EC Number	206-558-3
PubChem CID	67716
CompTox Dashboard (EPA)	DTXSID6059867
- InChI: InChI=1S/C2F4O/c3-1(7)2(4,5)6 Key: DCEPGADSNJKOJK-UHFFFAOYSA-N
- SMILES: C(=O)(C(F)(F)F)F

Properties
Chemical formula	C_{2}F_{4}O
Molar mass	116.015 g·mol^{−1}
Appearance	colorless gas
Boiling point	−59 °C
Solubility in water	reacts with water

Hazards
- GHS labelling
Pictograms	(GHS04: Compressed Gas) (GHS05: Corrosive) (GHS06: Toxic) (GHS07: Exclamation mark)
Signal word	Danger
- Except where otherwise noted, data are given for materials in their standard state (at 25 °C [77 °F], 100 kPa). Infobox references

Trifluoroacetyl fluoride is an organic compound of fluorine, oxygen, and carbon with the chemical formula C_{2}F_{4}O. The compound belongs to the group of carboxylic acid fluorides, specifically the fluoride of trifluoroacetic acid.

== Synthesis ==
Trifluoroacetyl fluoride can be prepared by the reaction of trifluoroacetic anhydride and anhydrous hydrogen fluoride:

(CF_{3}CO)_{2}O + HF → CF_{3}COF + CF_{3}COOH

or by the reaction of trifluoroacetic acid and vanadium pentafluoride:

CF_{3}COOH + VF_{5} → VOF_{3} + HF + CF_{3}COF↑

== Chemical properties ==
Trifluoroacetyl fluoride can react with rubidium fluoride or cesium fluoride in acetonitrile to form the corresponding pentafluoroethanolate:

CF_{3}COF + MF → CF_{3}CF_{2}OM (M = Rb, Cs)

The compound reacts with sulfur trioxide to form trifluoroacetyl fluorosulfonate:

CF_{3}COF + SO_{3} → CF_{3}C(O)OSO_{2}F

The compound hydrolyses in water.

== Uses ==
Trifluoroacetyl fluoride is an important industrial intermediate for trifluoroacetic acid, which is produced by its hydrolysis.
