= Cis-1,3,3,3-Tetrafluoropropene =

cis-1,3,3,3-Tetrafluoropropene

Names
- Other names R-1234ze(Z); HFO-1234ze(Z); cis-1,3,3,3-tetrafluoro-1-propene; cis-1,3,3,3-tetrafluoropropylene; cis-1,3,3,3-tetrafluoroprop-1-ene

Identifiers
CAS Number	29118-25-0
3D model (JSmol)	Interactive image
ChemSpider	9291157
ECHA InfoCard	100.261.873
EC Number	826-544-6
PubChem CID	11116025
UNII	XXV68QSS1E
CompTox Dashboard (EPA)	DTXSID70885447
- InChI: InChI=1S/C3H2F4/c4-2-1-3(5,6)7/h1-2H/b2-1- Key: CDOOAUSHHFGWSA-UPHRSURJSA-N
- SMILES: C(=C\F)\C(F)(F)F

Properties
Chemical formula	C_{3}H_{2}F_{4}
Molar mass	114.043 g·mol^{−1}

Related compounds
Related compounds	trans-1,3,3,3-tetrafluoropropene; 2,3,3,3-tetrafluoropropene
- Except where otherwise noted, data are given for materials in their standard state (at 25 °C [77 °F], 100 kPa). Infobox references

cis-1,3,3,3-Tetrafluoropropene (HFO-1234ze(Z), R-1234ze(Z)) is a hydrofluoroolefin which has been considered for use as a refrigerant in high-temperature heat pumps.
