= Pentafluoropropane =

Names
- Preferred IUPAC name 1,1,1,3,3-Pentafluoropropane
- Other names R-245fa; HFC-245fa; Enovate 3000; Genetron 245fa; AC1Q4KND; UNII-TA9UOF49CY

Identifiers
CAS Number	460-73-1
3D model (JSmol)	Interactive image
ChemSpider	61345
ECHA InfoCard	100.114.041
PubChem CID	68030
UNII	TA9UOF49CY
CompTox Dashboard (EPA)	DTXSID6052110
- InChI: InChI=1S/C3H3F5/c4-2(5)1-3(6,7)8/h2H,1H2 Key: MSSNHSVIGIHOJA-UHFFFAOYSA-N; InChI=1/C3H3F5/c4-2(5)1-3(6,7)8/h2H,1H2 Key: MSSNHSVIGIHOJA-UHFFFAOYAI
- SMILES: FC(F)CC(F)(F)F

Properties
Appearance	colorless gas
Density	1404.1 kg/m^{3} (liquid at 1 bar, 0 °C); 5.84 kg/m^{3} (vapor at 1 bar, 15 °C)
Boiling point	14.9 °C (58.8 °F; 288.0 K)
Solubility in water	7.18 g/L
log P	1.68

Hazards
- Occupational safety and health (OHS/OSH)
Main hazards	Simple Asphyxiant
Flash point	−24.963 °C (−12.933 °F; 248.187 K)
Autoignition temperature	412 °C (774 °F; 685 K)
- Except where otherwise noted, data are given for materials in their standard state (at 25 °C [77 °F], 100 kPa). Infobox references

1,1,1,3,3-Pentafluoropropane (HFC-245fa) is a hydrofluorocarbon, a colorless gas which is used primarily for closed-cell spray foam insulation. HFC-245fa is also known as pentafluoropropane and by its chemical name 1,1,1,3,3-pentafluoropropane.

== Environmental Effects ==
Unlike CFC and HCFC blowing agents formerly used for this purpose, it has no ozone depletion potential and is nearly non-toxic. Although it is intended to remain trapped within the foam insulation, it is practically non-biodegradable with a lifetime of 7.2 years when it eventually does escape into the atmosphere. It does have a high global warming potential of 950 (950 times the global warming effect of CO_{2}). Honeywell refers to this as "acceptable" in their literature, but they don't include the actual number.

== Economics ==
One of the disadvantages of R-245fa is its cost. In 2000, R-141b cost one US dollar per pound, whereas R-245fa cost $2.50 to $4.00 per pound. As of 2007, and prior to Sinochem's production it was already a high volume production chemical, with over 1 million pounds produced annually.

R-245a can be used as a feedstock for producing HFO-1234ze.

== Manufacturing history ==
Pentafluoropropane is produced by Honeywell and in Asia by Sinochem. Honeywell markets HFC-245fa under the Enovate and Genetron 245fa brand names. AlliedSignal, who adopted the Honeywell name after acquiring it, decided in 1999 to provide a non ozone depleting blowing agent as an alternative for dichlorofluoroethane (HCFC-141b) and trichlorofluoromethane (CFC-11). Competitors Atofina and General Electric pursued strategies using other agents.

== Gallery ==
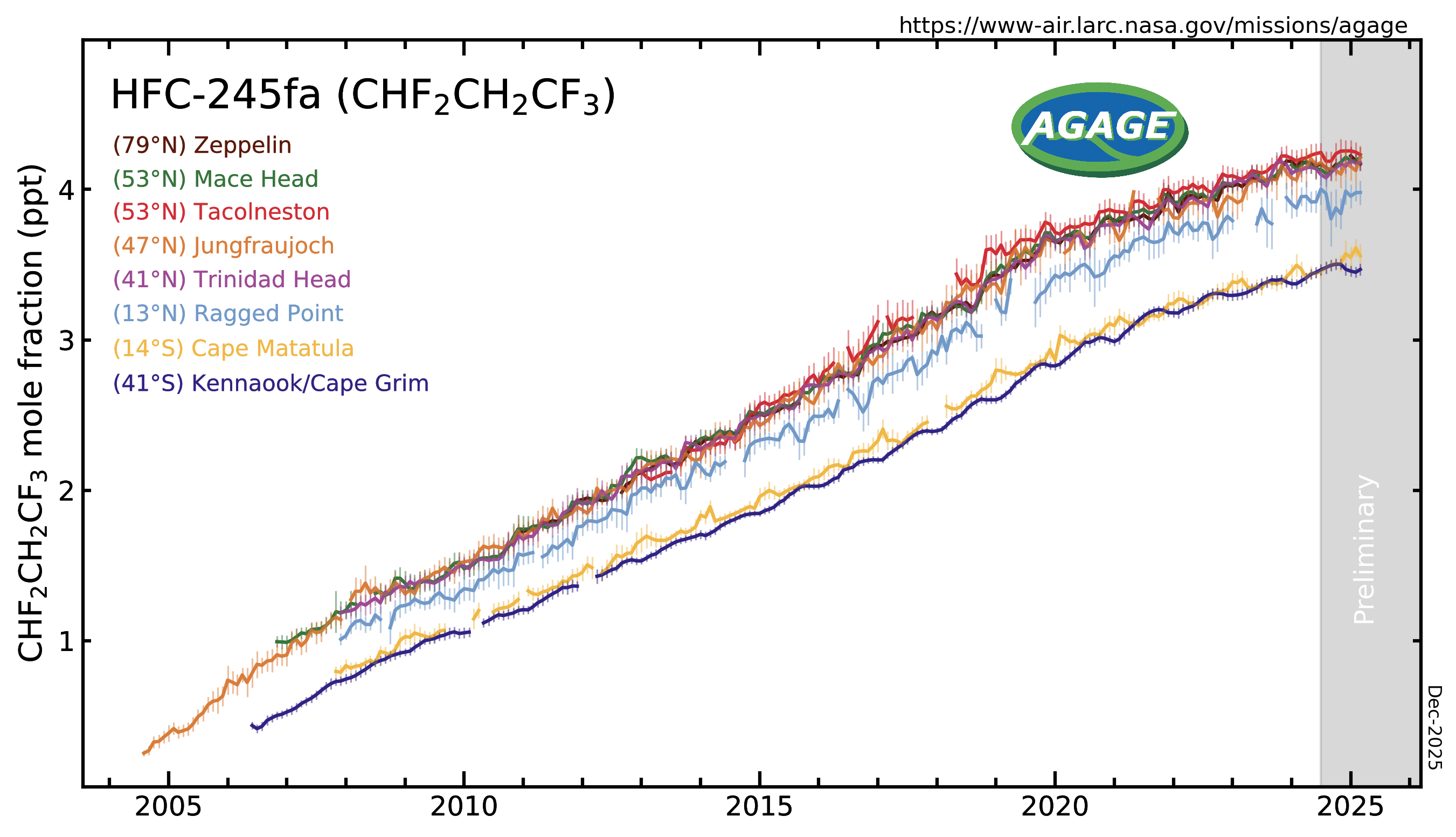
HFC-245fa measured by the Advanced Global Atmospheric Gases Experiment (AGAGE) in the lower atmosphere (troposphere) at stations around the world. Abundances are given as pollution free monthly mean mole fractions in parts-per-trillion.

== See also ==
- Building insulation
- Fiberglass
- Honeywell
