= Hydrofluoroolefin =

Class of chemical compounds

Chemical structure of 1,3,3,3-tetrafluoropropene (HFO-1234ze)

Hydrofluoroolefins (HFOs) are unsaturated organic compounds composed of hydrogen, fluorine and carbon. These organofluorine compounds are of interest as refrigerants. Unlike traditional hydrofluorocarbons (HFCs) and chlorofluorocarbons (CFCs), which are saturated, HFOs are olefins, otherwise known as alkenes.

HFO refrigerants are categorized as having zero ozone depletion potential (ODP) and low global warming potential (GWP) and so offer a more environmentally friendly alternative to CFC, HCFC, and HFC refrigerants. Compared to HCFCs and HFCs, HFOs have shorter tropospheric lifetimes due to the reactivity of the C=C bond with hydroxyl radicals and chlorine radicals. This quick reactivity prevents them from reaching the stratosphere and participating in the depletion of good ozone, leading to strong interest in the development and characterization of new HFO blends for use as refrigerants. Many refrigerants in the HFO class are inherently stable chemically and inert, non toxic, and non-flammable or mildly flammable. Many HFOs have the proper freezing and boiling points to be useful for refrigeration at common temperatures. They have also been adopted as blowing agents, i.e. in production of insulation foams, food industry, construction materials, and others. However, HFOs degrade to produce trifluoroacetic acid, a persistent toxic chemical which can lead to acidification of water bodies, and which can accumulate in sensitive wetland ecosystems.

HFOs are being developed as "fourth generation" refrigerants with 0.1% of the GWP of HFCs.

== Examples ==
HFOs in use include:

- 2,3,3,3-tetrafluoropropene (HFO-1234yf, trademarked as Opteon YF) and 1,3,3,3-tetrafluoropropene (HFO-1234ze).
- cis-1,1,1,4,4,4-hexafluoro-2-butene (HFO-1336mzz-Z; DR-2) shows also a promise in high temperature applications like cogeneration, heat recovery and medium temperature heat pumps.
- trans-1,1,1,4,4,4-hexafluoro-2-butene (HFO-1336mzz-E) also has good properties, and is being investigated.

The largest brand of HFOs is Opteon, produced by Chemours (a DuPont spin-off).

== Concerns ==
According to the Environmental Investigation Agency (EIA), HFOs contribute indirectly to both climate change and ozone depletion. The production of HFOs and their breakdown in the atmosphere lead to emissions of high global warming potential and ozone-depleting potential gases. On top of that, HFOs are a source of persistent and pervasive per- and polyfluoroalkyl substances (especially trifluoroacetic acid, TFA) pollution, and their use is irreversibly contaminating the environment.

== See also ==
- List of refrigerants
