= Bromodiiodomethane =

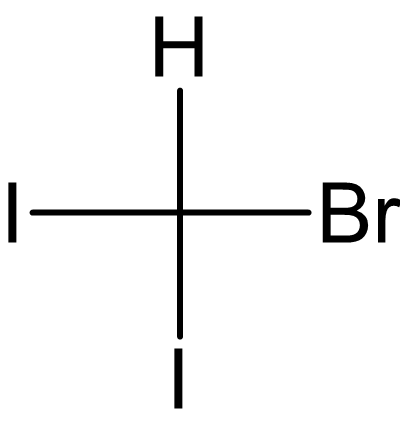

Names
- Preferred IUPAC name Bromo(diiodo)methane
- Other names Diiodobromomethane

Identifiers
CAS Number	557-95-9
3D model (JSmol)	Interactive image
ChEBI	CHEBI:198081
ChemSpider	61691
PubChem CID	68408
CompTox Dashboard (EPA)	DTXSID70204235
- InChI: InChI=1S/CHBrI2/c2-1(3)4/h1H Key: PTGIGXMFLYACDM-UHFFFAOYSA-N
- SMILES: C(Br)(I)I

Properties
Chemical formula	CHBrI_{2}
Molar mass	346.732 g·mol^{−1}
Appearance	light yellow solid
Density	3.6±0.1 g/cm³
Melting point	49 °C (120 °F; 322 K)
Boiling point	221.5 °C (430.7 °F; 494.6 K)
Solubility in water	soluble

Hazards
Flash point	87.8±18.4 °C
- Except where otherwise noted, data are given for materials in their standard state (at 25 °C [77 °F], 100 kPa). Infobox references

Bromodiiodomethane is a trihalomethane with the chemical formula CHBrI_{2}. This is a halomethane containing one bromine atom and two iodine atoms attached to the methane backbone.

== Natural occurrence ==
The compound is found in the oil of the alga Asparagopsis taxiformis.

== Synthesis ==
It can be obtained by reacting triiodomethane with bromine in carbon tetrachloride at 0 °C with a yield of 52%.

== Chemical properties ==
The pronounced reactivity of bromodiiodomethane is attributed to its molecular structure, which contains two iodine and two bromine atoms.

It can react with antimony pentachloride to produce bromochloroiodomethane. It can form bromoiodocarbene in the presence of benzyltriethylammonium chloride in a concentrated solution of sodium hydroxide, and react with alkenes to form a three-membered ring.

== Physical properties ==
Bromodiiodomethane forms a light yellow solid that is highly soluble in water, ethanol, and various organic solvents. It exhibits significant reactivity, making it valuable in the synthesis of a wide array of compounds, including dyes and other organic materials.

== Uses ==
Its role as a reagent spans multiple scientific disciplines such as organic synthesis, chromatography, and spectroscopy. In organic synthesis, it is a crucial component, while in chromatography, it aids in separating complex mixtures. Additionally, in spectroscopy, it facilitates the structural analysis of organic molecules.
