= Trichloroiodomethane =

Identifiers
| 3D model (JSmol) | Interactive image |
| ChemSpider | 500855 |
| PubChem CID | 576109 |
- SMILES: IC([Cl])([Cl])[Cl]

Properties
| Chemical formula | CCl_{3}I |
| Molar mass | 245.27 g·mol^{−1} |
| Appearance | Pale orange liquid |
| Boiling point | 142 °C (288 °F; 415 K) |
- Except where otherwise noted, data are given for materials in their standard state (at 25 °C [77 °F], 100 kPa). Infobox references

Trichloroiodomethane is a tetrahalomethane with the chemical formula CCl_{3}I. It contains one chlorine and three iodine atoms attached to a central carbon atom.

Despite its relative simplicity, trichloroiodomethane was not commercially available as of 2015.

Like other iodinated tetrahalomethanes, trichloroiodomethane decomposes easily, releasing iodine, The iodine atom is susceptible to halogen bonds; CCl_{3}I forms 1:1 adducts with pnictogen bases.

It is the minor product of chloroform oxidation with sodium hypoiodite (the major product being dichloroiodomethane), but can be produced efficiently through electrophilic substitution between carbon tetrachloride and aluminum iodide.
