= Chlorodiiodomethane =

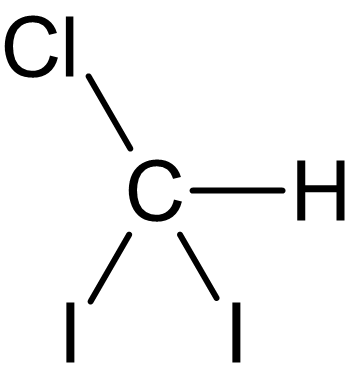

Names
- Preferred IUPAC name Chloro(diiodo)methane
- Other names Diiodochloromethane, CDIM

Identifiers
| CAS Number | 638-73-3 |
| 3D model (JSmol) | Interactive image |
| ChemSpider | 62699 |
| PubChem CID | 69493 |
| UNII | Standard InChI: Copy IUPAC Standard InChI: Copy |
| CompTox Dashboard (EPA) | DTXSID20213251 |
- InChI: InChI=1S/CHClI2/c2-1(3)4/h1H Key: RYPFDEIVUZVDCE-UHFFFAOYSA-N
- SMILES: C(Cl)(I)I

Properties
| Chemical formula | CHClI_{2} |
| Molar mass | 302.28 g·mol^{−1} |
| Density | 3.2±0.1 g/cm³ |
| Boiling point | 190.8 °C (375.4 °F; 463.9 K) |

Hazards
- GHS labelling
| Pictograms | (GHS07: Exclamation mark) |
| Signal word | Warning |
| Hazard statements | H302, H315, H319 |
| Flash point | 69.2±18.4 °C |
- Except where otherwise noted, data are given for materials in their standard state (at 25 °C [77 °F], 100 kPa). Infobox references

Chlorodiiodomethane is a trihalomethane with the chemical formula CHClI_{2}.

== Toxicity ==
It is an environmental pollutant and, like other iodine-containing trihalomethanes (except iodoform), is less cytotoxic than the corresponding iodocarboxylic acids.

== Chemical properties ==
It reacts with sodium hydroxide in the presence of a phase transfer catalyst to produce chloroiodocarbene, which can be added to olefins to produce 1-chloro-1-iodocyclopropane derivatives.
