= Dichloroiodomethane =

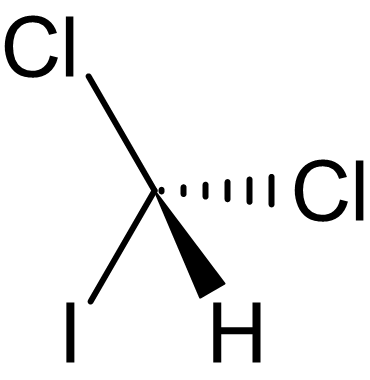

Names
- IUPAC name dichloro(iodo)methane
- Other names DCIM, Chloriodoform (archaic), IDCM, iododichloromethane

Identifiers
CAS Number	594-04-7
3D model (JSmol)	Interactive image
ChemSpider	11165
PubChem CID	11655
UNII	59FJY8K9MX
CompTox Dashboard (EPA)	DTXSID7021570
- InChI: InChI=1S/CHCl2I/c2-1(3)4/h1H Key: HNLZCOJXSLDGKD-UHFFFAOYSA-N
- SMILES: ClC(I)Cl

Properties
Chemical formula	CHCl_{2}I
Molar mass	210.82 g·mol^{−1}
Appearance	pale yellow liquid
Boiling point	131°C
Solubility in water	very slightly
- Except where otherwise noted, data are given for materials in their standard state (at 25 °C [77 °F], 100 kPa). Infobox references

Dichloroiodomethane (DCIM) is a trihalomethane with the chemical formula CHCl_{2}I. It is a heavy, nonflammable, transparent pale yellow liquid with a chloroform-like odour. DCIM is soluble in organic solvents like acetone, diethyl ether, ethanol and benzene. It decomposes in contact with air and light. It has been detected in disinfected tap water and is considered to be a contaminant. DCIM has an estimated half-life of 275 years in water.

It was discovered by Georges-Simon Serullas in 1824, two years after his discovery of iodoform.

== Synthesis ==
Many synthesis routes are known. Reaction of chloroform with sodium iodide or iodoethane gives dichloroiodomethane. Older methods include distillation of iodoform with phosphorus pentachloride or mercuric chloride.
