= Dorado Ground Water Contamination Site =

Superfund site in Puerto Rico, United States

- Superfund site
- Location within Puerto Rico
- Location: Dorado, Dorado, Puerto Rico, 98; 18°25′47″N 66°16′42″W

Information
- Contaminants: 1,2-dichloroethene; Bromodichloromethane; Chloroform; Tetrachloroethylene; Trichloroethylene
- Responsible parties: Unknown

Progress
- Proposed: April, 2016
- Listed: September, 2016

The Dorado Ground Water Contamination Site is one of 18 sites listed on the EPA’s National Priorities List in Puerto Rico, a territory of the United States, identified as posing a risk to human health and/or the environment because of a contamination plume in the underlying karst aquifer. Located in north-central Puerto Rico, 20 mi (32 km) to the west of the capital city, San Juan, the Dorado Ground Water Contamination site is located within the Maguayo and Dorado Urbano public water systems, and is the source of drinking water for more than 67,000 people. This site first came under scrutiny by officials in the 1980s and it was officially added to the EPA's Superfund list on September 9, 2016. The EPA is in the process of examining the precise extent and location of this contaminated groundwater plume and, at this time, the contaminants cannot be attributed to any specific source. In the wake of Hurricane Maria, the site has come under increased scrutiny because locals desperate for a source of safe drinking water have been using wells on the superfund site.

== Location ==
The Dorado Ground Water Contamination site is located in the north-central region of Puerto Rico, on the coast of the Atlantic Ocean, north of Toa Alta, east of Vega Alta, and west of Toa Baja. Dorado County is regarded as a tourist destination with golf courses, hotels, and beaches, though many locals would dispute this claim. Contaminated wells from the Dorado Ground Water Contamination Site draw water from the upper aquifer of the North Coast Limestone Aquifer System. This aquifer has historically been the principal source of fresh water for public and industrial use, and is the source of drinking water for more than 67,000 people in the region. The extent and volume of the contamination plum is currently unknown.

== Geology ==
The contaminated plume occupies the upper aquifer of the North Coast Limestone Aquifer System (NCLAS). The NCLAS consists of a sequence of limestone formations that dip northward toward the Atlantic Ocean. In the Dorado area, the NCLAS upper aquifer is composed of the permeable parts of surficial unconsolidated deposits, the Aymamón Limestone, the Aguada Limestone, and the upper permeable parts of the Cibao formation. Groundwater generally flows in a northerly direction toward the coast, with a smaller groundwater flow component east toward the north-flowing Río de la Plata. The freshwater lens in the NCLAS upper aquifer is estimated to be 200 to 300 feet thick. This aquifer exhibits typical karst characteristics, including transmission of groundwater through channel networks near the water table and decreasing permeability with increasing depth below the water table. Figure citation

== Contamination ==
As far back as the 1980s, wells in the Maguayo and Dorado Urbano systems have been tested for a wide range of volatile organic compounds (VOC's), primarily tetrachloroethylene (PCE) and trichloroethylene (TCE). In September 2015, the EPA conducted a thorough evaluation of the wells in Dorado and the results confirmed the continuing presence of VOCs in some of the wells. The analytical results indicate the presence of bromodichloromethane, chloroform, [1,2-DCE], PCE, and TCE, at concentrations significantly above the background levels. The PCE concentrations in three wells, Maguayo #4, Maguayo #5, and Maguayo #6, exceed the EPA MCL of 5 μg/L. Maguayo #4 and Maguayo #5 are currently inactive but are still considered as viable components of the system. The Maguayo #6 well is currently active and contributing to the blended Maguayo water supply system and as of September 2015, Maguayo #2, and Maguayo #7 are also active, though not contributing to the water supply system. The pollutants PCE and TCE are believed to cause health problems including liver damage and increased risk of cancer.

As a part of the response to Hurricane Maria in September, 2017, the EPA has conducted new tests and determined that there are no exceedances of drinking water standards at the Dorado Groundwater Superfund site currently. These finding have been questioned by New York Representative Jerrold Nadler, however, during a congressional hearing into the federal response to the 2017 hurricane season. Congressman Nadler questioned how the well water could be safe to drink just one year after being placed on the EPA's National Priorities List. [CNN] also reports that they have independently verified that VOC concentrations are within an acceptable range for drinking.

=== Contaminant Source ===
Since 2008, EPA has made multiple attempts to identify the source(s) of the contamination plume. In 2008, EPA launched the Maguayo Site Discovery Initiative as an effort to identify possible hazardous waste sites in the vicinity of the contaminated wells, but the data collects was unable to clearly connect any of the tested facilities directly to the contamination. Due to the karst nature of the site, the EPA believes that it is unlikely that further sampling will allow the EPA to identify a source of the contamination, thus this additional effort is beyond the scope of further evaluations. See the EPA's initial April, 2016 report for a comprehensive list of the potential sources, and a list of those facilities that have tested positive for chlorinated solvents.

== Hurricane Maria ==
On October 14, 2017, reports from CNN and others began to surface that wells from the Dorado Ground Water Contamination Plant were being used by residents without access to an alternative source for clean, safe drinking water more than three weeks after Hurricane Maria made landfall in Puerto Rico. The Washington Post reported that the fencing around the superfund site had been torn open, with the “Peligro” warning sign, hidden beneath debris and dense vegetation. Residents, many who were unaware that the well, Maguayo #4, was at great risk of contamination, as a part of a superfund site. The Post claims that residents, "one after another, ...attached a hose to draw water for bathing, washing dishes and, in some cases, drinking... fill(ing) buckets, jugs, (and) soda bottles." This specific well, Maguayo #4, had been listed as "inactive with the pump damaged or removed" by the EPA's initial April, 2016 report, so it is unclear how these residents had access to the water. Furthermore, CNN has reported that it witnessed workers from the Autoridad de Acueductos y Alcantarillados, the island's water utility authority, distributing water in the wake of the Hurricane.

The fact that residents and authorities turned to wells at the Dorado Superfund Site for drinking water is cited as one example by critics who claim that President Trump's response to Hurricane Maria was inadequate. Photo Reference
