= Dichlorodiiodomethane =

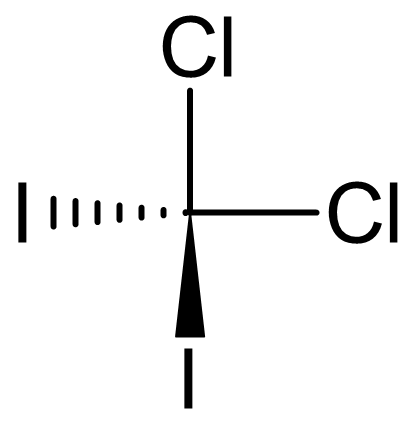

Names
- Preferred IUPAC name Dichloro(diiodo)methane

Identifiers
CAS Number	594-23-0
3D model (JSmol)	Interactive image
ChemSpider	15218897
PubChem CID	12542273
CompTox Dashboard (EPA)	DTXSID10501896
- InChI: InChI=1S/CCl2I2/c2-1(3,4)5 Key: ZOWYTDVMTPRWGU-UHFFFAOYSA-N
- SMILES: ClC(Cl)(I)I

Properties
Chemical formula	CCl_{2}I_{2}
Molar mass	336.72 g·mol^{−1}
Appearance	unstable solid
Density	3.2 g/cm³
Melting point	85 °C (185 °F; 358 K)
Boiling point	206.8 °C (404.2 °F; 479.9 K)

Hazards
Flash point	78.9 °C
- Except where otherwise noted, data are given for materials in their standard state (at 25 °C [77 °F], 100 kPa). Infobox references

Dichlorodiiodomethane is a tetrahalomethane with the chemical formula CCl_{2}I_{2}. This organic compound is characterized by having four halogen atoms—two chlorine and two iodine—attached to a methane backbone.

== Synthesis ==
The compound was initially prepared by Höland in 1887 by treating CH_{2}Cl_{2} with Br_{2}/I_{2} at 100-200 °C for several weeks. Distillation gave dichloroiodomethane and dichlorodiiodomethane.

== Physical properties ==
The compound forms an unstable solid that melts and decomposes at 85 °C. Its heat of formation (−ΔH°F, 25 °C, gas phase) is −24 kcal·mol^{−1} (compare to 70 kcal·mol^{−1} for difluorodiiodomethane and −43 kcal·mol^{−1} for dibromodiiodomethane, calculated values). Its carbon-13 shift is −90.7 ppm.
