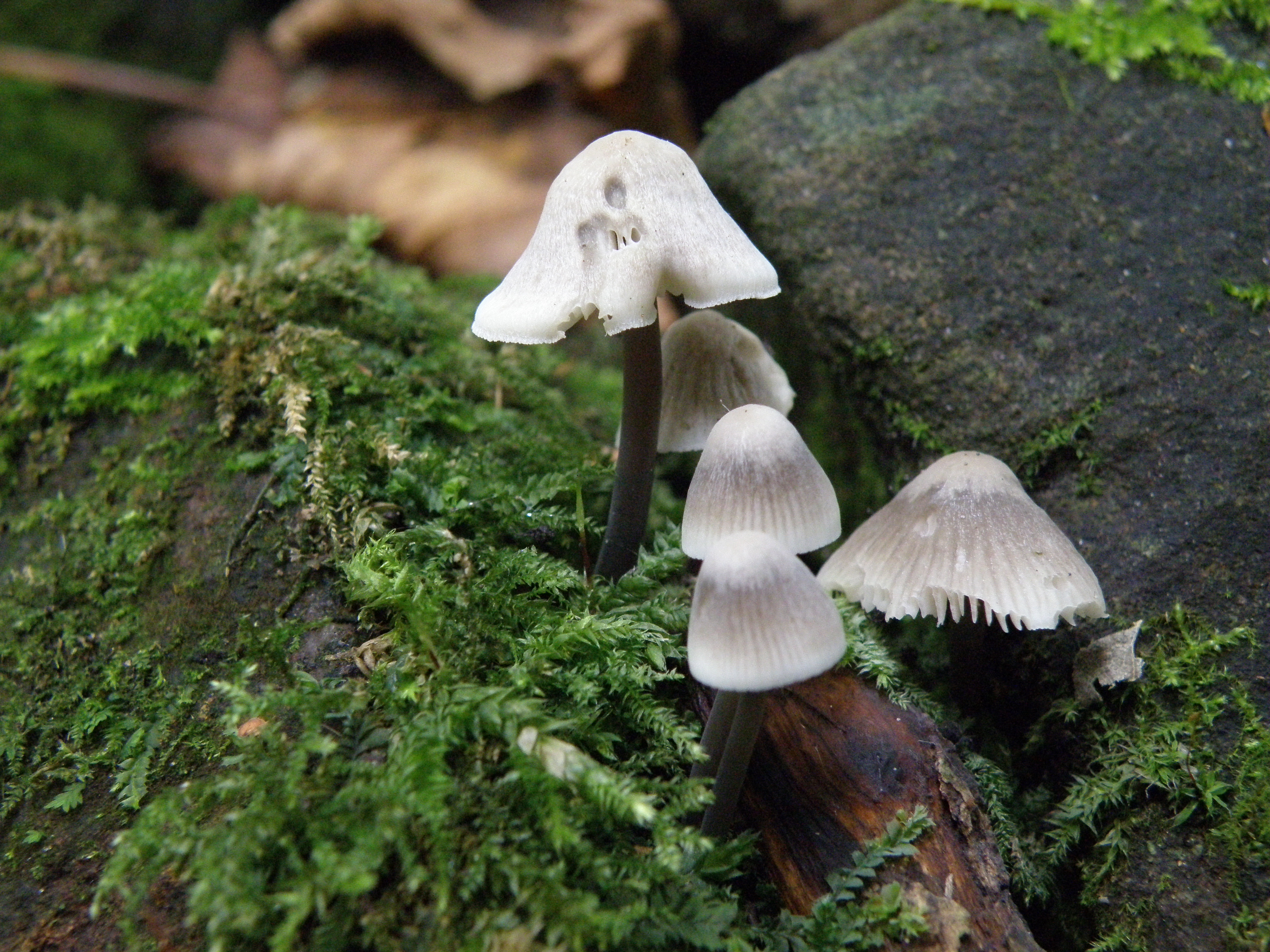

Scientific classification
- Kingdom: Fungi
- Division: Basidiomycota
- Class: Agaricomycetes
- Order: Agaricales
- Family: Mycenaceae
- Genus: Mycena
- Species: M. arcangeliana

Binomial name
- Mycena arcangeliana Bres. (1904)

Synonyms
- Mycena olivascens Quél.; Mycena vitilis var. olivascens (Quél. ex Bigeard & Guillem.) Kühner (1938); Mycena arcangeliana var. oortiana Kühner (1938); Mycena oortiana Hora (1960)

= Mycena arcangeliana =

Species of fungus

Mycena arcangeliana
- Mycological characteristics
- Gills on hymenium
- Cap is conical or campanulate
- Hymenium is adnexed
- Stipe is bare
- Spore print is white
- Ecology is saprotrophic
- Edibility is inedible

Mycena arcangeliana (commonly known as the angel's bonnet or the late-season bonnet) is a species of Mycenaceae fungus. It has been known by a number of scientific names, and its taxonomy is still somewhat disputed. It produces small mushrooms with caps varying in colour from whitish to a darker grey-brown, and stems of an olive-greyish that fade with age. The mushrooms can be mistaken for the similar Mycena flavescens. They have a mild taste, but a strong smell of iodoform; they are not edible. The species grows on dead wood in autumn months, and can be found throughout Europe.

== Taxonomy, naming, and classification ==
Mycena arcangeliana was first described by Giacomo Bresadola in 1904; the species was listed along with 41 others found in Pisa, in an article by Egidio Barsali published in the Bollettino Della Societa Botanica Italiana (Bulletin of the Botanical Society of Italy). Authors Roger Phillips and Paul Sterry both describe the name Mycena oortiana as synonymous; M. oortiana was a name given by Frederich Hora in 1960 based on Robert Kühner's 1938 name for the variety Mycena arcangeliana var. oortiana, an invalid name. Phillips had earlier considered M. arcangeliana var. oortiana to be a synonym of M. oortiana, and MycoBank lists it as a synonym of Lucien Quélet's Mycena olivascens. However, Index Fungorum lists both M. olivascens and Kühner's Mycena vitilis var. olivascens as synonyms of M. arcangeliana. The specific epithet arcangeliana may be in honour of Giovanni Arcangeli, who collected the species in the Orto botanico di Pisa. M. arcangeliana is commonly known as the angel's bonnet, or the late-season bonnet.

Within the genus Mycena, it is found in the section Filipedes, on account of the cheilocystidia covered with evenly spaced, short cylindrical excrescences, and its size and occurrence on wood. It can be separated from the other members of the section on account of a cap with yellowish to olive shades, gills with pinkish hints and stems with vaguely violet colouration.

== Description ==
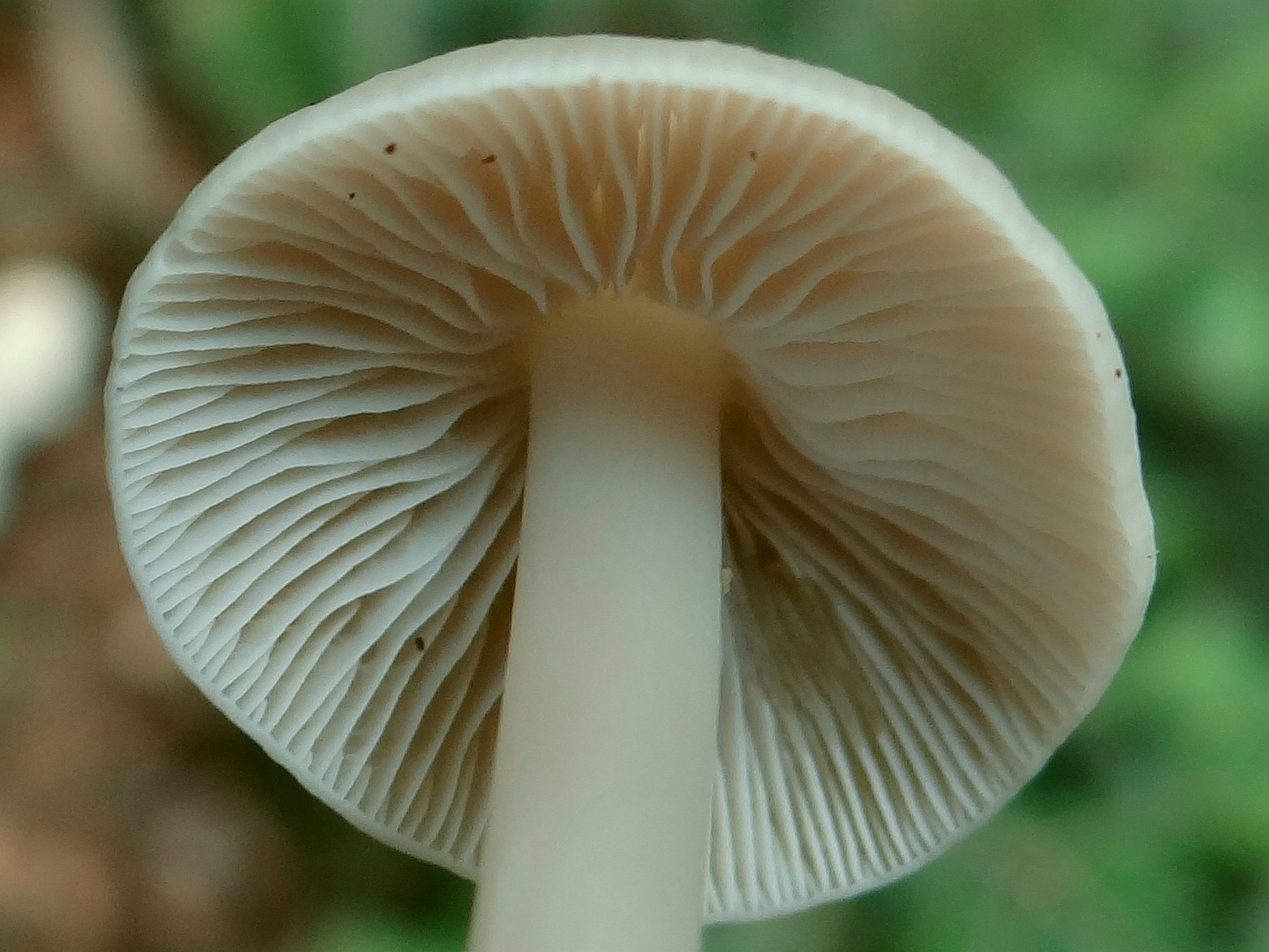
M. arcangeliana gills

Mycena arcangeliana mushrooms have caps of between 1 and 5 centimetres (0.4 and 2 in) in diameter which are conical in shape in younger mushrooms, becoming bell-shaped with a broad umbo in older specimens. The oldest mushrooms have caps which are almost completely flat. The colouration varies from a whitish to a darker grey-brown, sometimes with tints of olive or yellow, and it has furrows on the typically translucent surface. However, it is hygrophanous, and dries to a much paler colour. The cylindrical stem measures between 20 and 40 millimetres (0.8 and 2 in) in length, by 1 and 2 mm (0.04 and 0.08 in) in width. In young mushrooms, it is an olive-greyish colour, tinted with lilac, though it fades as the mushroom ages. The very top of the stem is a whitish colour, while the base is covered in white hairs. It is smooth and silky in texture, and there is no ring. The crowded gills are adnexed, that is, connected to the stem by only part of their depth, and are white in colour, turning pinkish as the mushroom ages. The gill edges are somewhat toothed. The flesh has a mild taste, but a strong smell of iodoform. In the cap, it is white, while in the stem, it is grey. The mushrooms are not edible.

=== Microscopic characteristics ===
Mycena arcangeliana mushrooms leave a whitish spore print, while the spores are shaped like apple seeds and amyloid, meaning that they stain a dark colour in Melzer's reagent or Lugol's solution. The basidia are four-spored. They measure from between 7 and 8 micrometres (μm) by 4.5 and 5 μm. There are a large number of hyaline cheilocystidia (cystidia on the edge of the gills) which are club-shaped or ovate. They have thin cell walls, and are covered in grain-like warts. The pleurocystidia (the cystidia on the face of the gill) are similar in appearance. The pileipellis is made up of wart-covered hyphae measuring between 2 and 4.5 μm wide and up to 30 μm long. The outermost layer of the stem is made up hyphae with short, cylindrical hairs. The hyphae have clamp connections.

=== Similar species ===
Mycena arcangeliana is somewhat similar to the less common Mycena flavescens, a species found in both hardwood and softwood forests on the floor among leaf or needle litter or grassland. M. flavescens typically has a whiter cap and a smell reminiscent of radish. M. peyerimhoffi, known from Algeria, has a similar cap colour to M. arcangeliana, but has a yellow stem. M. limonia, known from the Netherlands, has a lemon-yellow cap and stem and more gills. Another species similar in appearance is M. metata, which has a sweet taste.

== Habitat and distribution ==
Mycena arcangeliana grows on dead deciduous wood, favouring beech and ash, where it grows in "small troops". It has also been recorded less frequently on conifers, bracken and Japanese knotweed. There have been reports from grassland, but these are probably a misidentification of M. flavescens. It is infrequently to commonly found in late summer to autumn months in the British Isles, though it is more commonly encountered in the south. Its distribution is fairly widespread elsewhere in Europe, though it is less common. It has been listed as vulnerable on the Red List of Threatened Fungi in Norway. "Mycena oortiana", which was rarely found in mycological literature, was described as a predominantly west-European species; however, M. arcangeliana has also been recorded in Scandinavia, Greenland, and Italy, from where it was first described.
