= Bromochloroiodomethane =

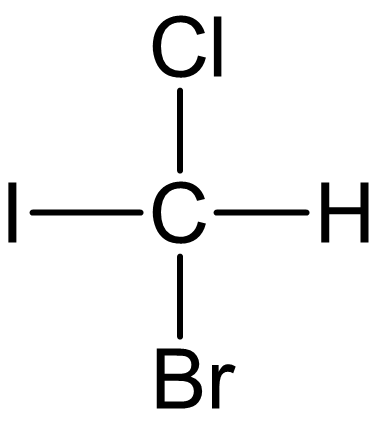

Names
- Preferred IUPAC name bromo-chloro-iodomethane
- Other names IBCM, chlorobromoiodomethane

Identifiers
CAS Number	34970-00-8
3D model (JSmol)	Interactive image
ChemSpider	33968
PubChem CID	37017
CompTox Dashboard (EPA)	DTXSID9021502
- InChI: InChI=1S/CHBrClI/c2-1(3)4/h1H Key: WUHPSARYLVYQOT-UHFFFAOYSA-N
- SMILES: C(Cl)(Br)I

Properties
Chemical formula	CHBrClI
Molar mass	255.28 g·mol^{−1}
Appearance	Light-sensitive liquid
Density	2.9 g/cm³
Boiling point	157.4 °C (315.3 °F; 430.5 K)
Solubility in water	poorly soluble

Hazards
- GHS labelling
Pictograms	(GHS07: Exclamation mark)
Signal word	Warning
Hazard statements	H315, H317, H319
Precautionary statements	P280, P305, P338, P351
Flash point	69.2±18.4 °C
- Except where otherwise noted, data are given for materials in their standard state (at 25 °C [77 °F], 100 kPa). Infobox references

Bromochloroiodomethane is a trihalomethane with the chemical formula CHBrClI. This complex organic compound is characterized by having three halogen atoms—bromine, chlorine, and iodine—bonded to a methane backbone. The compound has R and S configurations.

== Synthesis ==
It can be prepared by reacting a solution of bromodiiodomethane in carbon tetrachloride with a solution of antimony pentachloride in dichloromethane at 0 °C.

== Chemical properties ==
Like other trihalomethanes, it can be deprotonated in situ at low temperatures to give chlorobromoiodomethyl anions. For example, it can react with phenylmercuric chloride in the presence of potassium tert-butoxide to form phenyl(chlorobromoiodomethyl)mercury.

== Physical properties ==
The compound forms a pale yellow liquid that is soluble in organic solvents but poorly soluble in water.

== Uses ==
The compound is primarily used as a reagent in organic synthesis and as a building block for more complex molecules.
