= Chloroform (data page) =

Chemical data page

This page provides supplementary chemical data on chloroform.

== Material Safety Data Sheet ==
The handling of this chemical may incur notable safety precautions. It is highly recommend that you seek the Safety Data Sheet (SDS) for this chemical from a reliable source and follow its directions.

- SIRI
- Science Stuff
- Fisher Scientific

== Structure and properties ==
Structure and properties
| Index of refraction, n_{D} | 1.4459 at 19 °C |
| Abbe number | ? |
| Dielectric constant, ε_{r} | 4.8069 ε_{0} at 20 °C |
| Bond strength | ? |
| Bond length | C-Cl 1.75 Å |
| Bond angle | Cl-C-Cl 110.3° |
| Dipole moment | 1.01 D (gas); 1.04 D |
| Magnetic susceptibility | 59,3^{−6} cm^{3}/mol |
| Surface tension | 28.5 dyn/cm at 10 °C; 27.1 dyn/cm at 20 °C; 26.67 dyn/cm at 25 °C; 23.44 dyn/cm at 50 °C; 21.7 dyn/cm at 60 °C; 20.20 dyn/cm at 75 °C |
| Viscosity | 0.786 mPa·s at –10 °C; 0.699 mPa·s at 0 °C; 0.563 mPa·s at 20 °C; 0.542 mPa·s at 25 °C; 0.464 mPa·s at 40 °C; 0.389 mPa·s at 60 °C |

== Thermodynamic properties ==
Phase behavior
| Triple point | 209.61 K (–63.54 °C), ? Pa |
| Critical point | 537 K (264 °C), 5328.68 kPa |
| Std enthalpy change of fusion, Δ_{fus}H^{~~o~~} | 8.8 kJ/mol |
| Std entropy change of fusion, Δ_{fus}S^{~~o~~} | 42 J/(mol·K) |
| Std enthalpy change of vaporization, Δ_{vap}H^{~~o~~} | 31.4 kJ/mol |
| Std entropy change of vaporization, Δ_{vap}S^{~~o~~} | 105.3 J/(mol·K) |
Solid properties
| Std enthalpy change of formation, Δ_{f}H^{~~o~~}_{solid} | ? kJ/mol |
| Standard molar entropy, S^{~~o~~}_{solid} | ? J/(mol K) |
| Heat capacity, c_{p} | ? J/(mol K) |
Liquid properties
| Std enthalpy change of formation, Δ_{f}H^{~~o~~}_{liquid} | –134.3 kJ/mol |
| Standard molar entropy, S^{~~o~~}_{liquid} | ? J/(mol K) |
| Enthalpy of combustion | –473.2 kJ/mol Δ_{c}H^{~~o~~} |
| Heat capacity, c_{p} | 114.25 J/(mol K) |
Gas properties
| Std enthalpy change of formation, Δ_{f}H^{~~o~~}_{gas} | –103.18 kJ/mol |
| Standard molar entropy, S^{~~o~~}_{gas} | 295.6 J/(mol K) at 25 °C |
| Heat capacity, c_{p} | 65.33 J/(mol K) at 25 °C |
| van der Waals' constants | a = 1537 L^{2} kPa/mol^{2} b = 0.1022 liter per mole |

== Vapor pressure of liquid ==
| P in mm Hg | 1 | 10 | 40 | 100 | 400 | 760 | 1520 | 3800 | 7600 | 15200 | 30400 | 45600 |
| T in °C | –58.0 | –29.7 | –7.1 | 10.4 | 42.7 | 61.3 | 83.9 | 120.0 | 152.3 | 191.8 | 237.5 | — |

Table data obtained from CRC Handbook of Chemistry and Physics 44th ed.

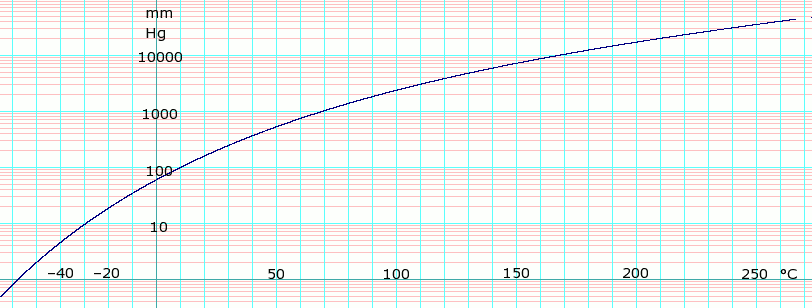
log_{10} of Chloroform vapor pressure. Uses formula: $\scriptstyle \log_e P_{mmHg} =$$\scriptstyle \log_e (\frac {760} {101.325}) - 10.07089 \log_e(T+273.15) - \frac {6351.140} {T+273.15} + 81.14393 + 9.127608 \times 10^{-6} (T+273.15)^2$ obtained from CHERIC

== Distillation data ==
Vapor-liquid Equilibrium for Chloroform/Ethanol; P = 101.325 kPa
| BP Temp. °C | % by mole chloroform |
| BP Temp. °C | liquid | vapor |
| 78.15 | 0.0 | 0.0 |
| 78.07 | 0.52 | 1.59 |
| 77.83 | 1.02 | 3.01 |
| 76.81 | 2.21 | 7.45 |
| 74.90 | 5.80 | 17.10 |
| 74.39 | 6.72 | 19.40 |
| 73.55 | 8.38 | 23.31 |
| 72.85 | 10.57 | 28.05 |
| 72.24 | 11.80 | 30.52 |
| 71.58 | 13.18 | 33.13 |
| 69.72 | 17.65 | 41.00 |
| 68.95 | 19.62 | 43.66 |
| 68.58 | 20.71 | 45.43 |
| 67.35 | 23.86 | 49.77 |
| 65.89 | 28.54 | 55.09 |
| 64.87 | 32.35 | 58.48 |
| 63.88 | 36.07 | 61.27 |
| 63.23 | 39.34 | 64.50 |
| 62.61 | 41.38 | 65.49 |
| 62.17 | 44.41 | 67.57 |
| 61.48 | 49.97 | 71.11 |
| 61.00 | 53.92 | 72.91 |
| 60.49 | 54.76 | 73.57 |
| 60.35 | 59.65 | 74.68 |
| 60.30 | 61.60 | 75.53 |
| 60.20 | 63.04 | 76.12 |
| 60.09 | 64.48 | 76.69 |
| 59.97 | 66.90 | 77.74 |
| 59.54 | 72.01 | 79.33 |
| 59.32 | 79.07 | 82.62 |
| 59.26 | 82.99 | 83.59 |
| 59.28 | 84.97 | 84.69 |
| 59.31 | 85.96 | 85.24 |
| 59.46 | 89.92 | 87.93 |
| 59.72 | 91.10 | 88.73 |
| 59.70 | 92.44 | 89.79 |
| 59.84 | 93.90 | 91.02 |
| 59.91 | 95.26 | 92.56 |
| 60.18 | 96.13 | 93.58 |
| 60.88 | 98.89 | 97.93 |
| 61.13 | 100.00 | 100.00 |

Vapor-liquid Equilibrium for Chloroform/Acetone; P = 101.325 kPa
| BP Temp. °C | % by mole acetone |
| BP Temp. °C | liquid | vapor |
| 62.11 | 7.5 | 4.9 |
| 63.45 | 17.7 | 13.7 |
| 63.95 | 22.9 | 19.1 |
| 64.19 | 26.2 | 23.0 |
| 64.29 | 28.5 | 25.9 |
| 64.45 | 34.5 | 33.9 |
| 64.47 | 35.7 | 35.6 |
| 64.47 | 36.5 | 36.6 |
| 64.46 | 38.7 | 39.6 |
| 64.43 | 39.5 | 40.8 |
| 64.40 | 40.4 | 42.0 |
| 64.20 | 45.2 | 48.8 |
| 64.05 | 46.6 | 51.0 |
| 64.04 | 47.4 | 52.0 |
| 63.67 | 51.9 | 57.9 |
| 63.19 | 56.4 | 64.1 |
| 62.73 | 59.4 | 67.9 |
| 62.42 | 61.0 | 69.7 |
| 62.16 | 62.4 | 71.5 |
| 61.24 | 68.4 | 78.0 |
| 60.23 | 74.7 | 84.0 |
| 57.23 | 91.8 | 96.1 |

Vapor-liquid Equilibrium for Chloroform/Methanol; P = 760 mm Hg
| BP Temp. °C | % by mole chloroform |
| BP Temp. °C | liquid | vapor |
| 63 | 4.0 | 10.2 |
| 62 | 6.5 | 15.4 |
| 60.9 | 9.5 | 21.5 |
| 59.3 | 14.6 | 30.4 |
| 57.8 | 19.6 | 37.8 |
| 57.0 | 23.0 | 42.0 |
| 55.9 | 28.7 | 47.2 |
| 55.3 | 33.2 | 50.7 |
| 54.7 | 38.3 | 54.0 |
| 54.3 | 42.5 | 56.4 |
| 54.0 | 45.9 | 58.0 |
| 53.8 | 52.0 | 60.7 |
| 53.7 | 55.7 | 61.9 |
| 53.5 | 62.8 | 64.3 |
| 53.5 | 63.6 | 64.6 |
| 53.5 | 66.7 | 65.5 |
| 53.7 | 75.3 | 68.4 |
| 53.9 | 79.7 | 70.1 |
| 54.4 | 85.5 | 73.0 |
| 55.2 | 90.4 | 76.8 |
| 56.3 | 93.7 | 81.2 |
| 57.9 | 97.0 | 87.5 |

== Spectral data ==
UV-Vis
| λ_{max} | ? nm |
| Extinction coefficient, ε | ? |
IR
| Major absorption bands | 1215, 761, 668 cm^{−1} |
NMR
| Proton NMR | δ CDCl_{3} 7.26 (s, 1H) |
| Carbon-13 NMR | δ CDCl_{3} 77.2 |
| Other NMR data |
MS
| Masses of main fragments |
