= Fluoroform =

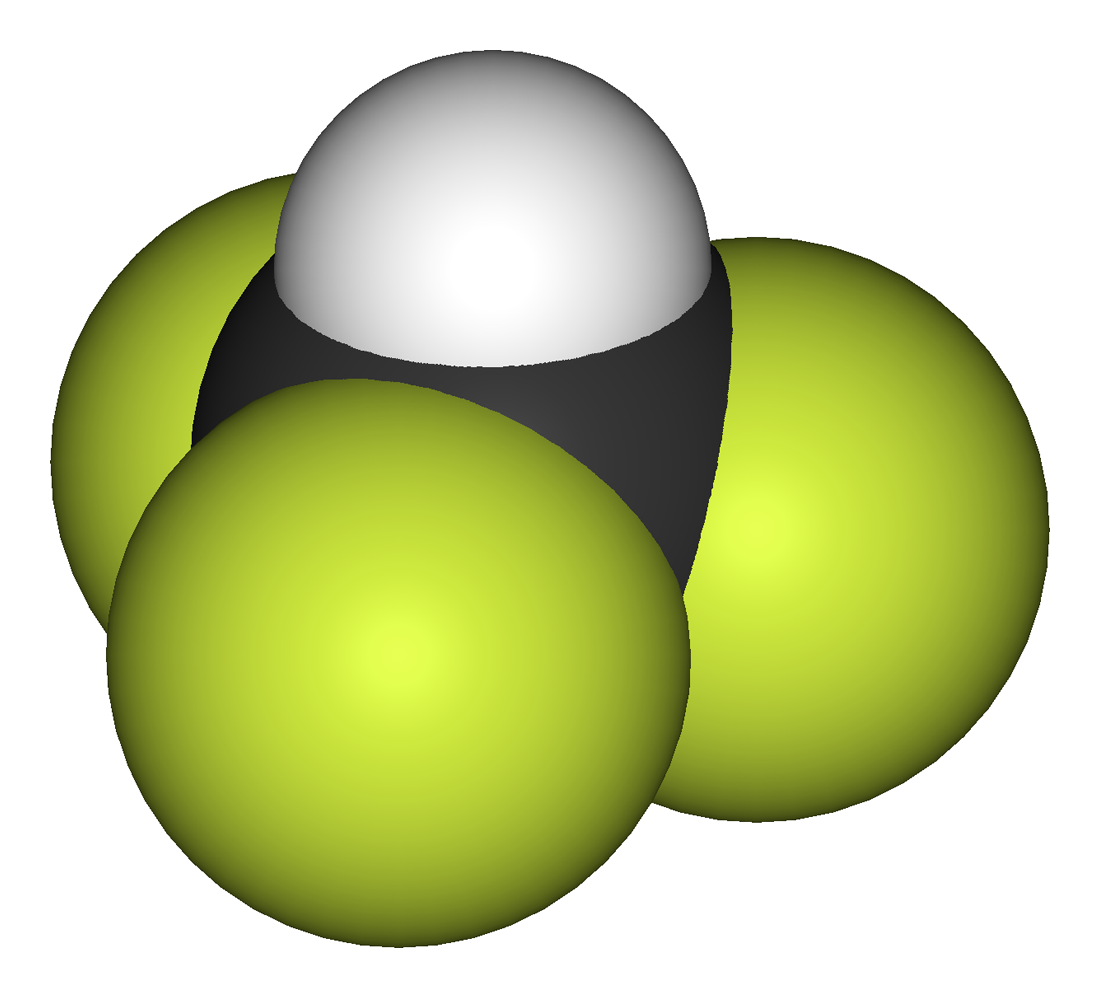

Names
- IUPAC name Trifluoromethane
- Other names Fluoroform, carbon trifluoride, methyl trifluoride, Fluoryl, Freon 23, Arcton 1

Identifiers
CAS Number	75-46-7
3D model (JSmol)	Interactive image
Abbreviations	HFC 23, R-23, FE-13, UN 1984
ChEBI	CHEBI:24073
ChemSpider	21106179
ECHA InfoCard	100.000.794
EC Number	200-872-4
PubChem CID	6373
RTECS number	PB6900000
UNII	ZJ51L9A260
CompTox Dashboard (EPA)	DTXSID0026410
- InChI: InChI=1S/CHF3/c2-1(3)4/h1H Key: XPDWGBQVDMORPB-UHFFFAOYSA-N; InChI=1/CHF3/c2-1(3)4/h1H Key: XPDWGBQVDMORPB-UHFFFAOYAM
- SMILES: FC(F)F

Properties
Chemical formula	CHF_{3}
Molar mass	70.014 g·mol^{−1}
Appearance	Colorless gas
Density	2.946 kg/m^{3} (gas, 1 bar, 15 °C)
Melting point	−155.2 °C (−247.4 °F; 118.0 K)
Boiling point	−82.1 °C (−115.8 °F; 191.1 K)
Solubility in water	1 g/L
Solubility in organic solvents	Soluble
Vapor pressure	4.38 MPa at 20 °C
Henry's law constant (k_{H})	0.013 mol·kg^{−1}·bar^{−1}
Acidity (pK_{a})	25–28

Structure
Molecular shape	Tetrahedral

Hazards
- Occupational safety and health (OHS/OSH)
Main hazards	Nervous system depression
- GHS labelling
Pictograms	(GHS04: Compressed Gas)
Signal word	Warning
Hazard statements	H280
Precautionary statements	P403
NFPA 704 (fire diamond)	2 0 0
Flash point	Non-flammable

Related compounds
Related compounds	Fluoromethane CH_{3}F; Difluoromethane CH_{2}F_{2}; Tetrafluoromethane CF_{4}; Chloroform CHCl_{3}; Bromoform CHBr_{3}; Iodoform CHI_{3}; Chlorodifluoromethane CHF_{2}Cl; Dichlorofluoromethane CHFCl_{2}; Bromodichloromethane CHCl_{2}Br; Dibromochloromethane CHClBr_{2}; Bromodifluoromethane CHF_{2}Br; Dibromofluoromethane CHFBr_{2}; Deuterated chloroform CDCl_{3}
- Except where otherwise noted, data are given for materials in their standard state (at 25 °C [77 °F], 100 kPa). verify (what is ?) Infobox references

Fluoroform, or trifluoromethane, is the chemical compound with the formula CHF_{3}. It is a hydrofluorocarbon as well as being a part of the haloforms, a class of compounds with the formula CHX_{3} (X = halogen) with C_{3v} symmetry. Fluoroform is used in diverse applications in organic synthesis. It is not an ozone depleter but is a greenhouse gas.

== Synthesis ==
About 20 million kg per year are produced industrially as both a by-product of and precursor to the manufacture of Teflon. It is produced by reaction of chloroform with HF:

CHCl_{3} + 3 HF → CHF_{3} + 3 HCl

It is also generated biologically in small amounts apparently by decarboxylation of trifluoroacetic acid.

=== Historical ===
Fluoroform was first obtained by Maurice Meslans in the violent reaction of iodoform with dry silver fluoride in 1894. The reaction was improved by Otto Ruff by substitution of silver fluoride by a mixture of mercury fluoride and calcium fluoride. The exchange reaction works with iodoform and bromoform, and the exchange of the first two halogen atoms by fluorine is vigorous. By changing to a two step process, first forming a bromodifluoromethane in the reaction of antimony trifluoride with bromoform and finishing the reaction with mercury fluoride the first efficient synthesis method was found by Henne.

== Industrial applications ==
CHF_{3} is used in the semiconductor industry in plasma etching of silicon oxide and silicon nitride. Known as R-23 or HFC-23, it was also a useful refrigerant, sometimes as a replacement for chlorotrifluoromethane (CFC-13) and is a byproduct of its manufacture.

When used as a fire suppressant, the fluoroform carries the DuPont trade name, FE-13. CHF_{3} is recommended for this application because of its low toxicity, its low reactivity, and its high density. HFC-23 has been used in the past as a replacement for Halon 1301(CFC-13B1) in fire suppression systems as a total flooding gaseous fire suppression agent.

=== Organic chemistry ===
Fluoroform is weakly acidic with a pK_{a} = 25–28 and quite inert. Attempted deprotonation results in defluorination to generate F^{−} and difluorocarbene (CF_{2}). Some organocopper and organocadmium compounds have been developed as trifluoromethylation reagents.

Fluoroform is a precursor of the Ruppert-Prakash reagent CF_{3}Si(CH_{3})_{3}, which is a source of the nucleophilic CF^{−}_{3} anion.

== Greenhouse gas ==
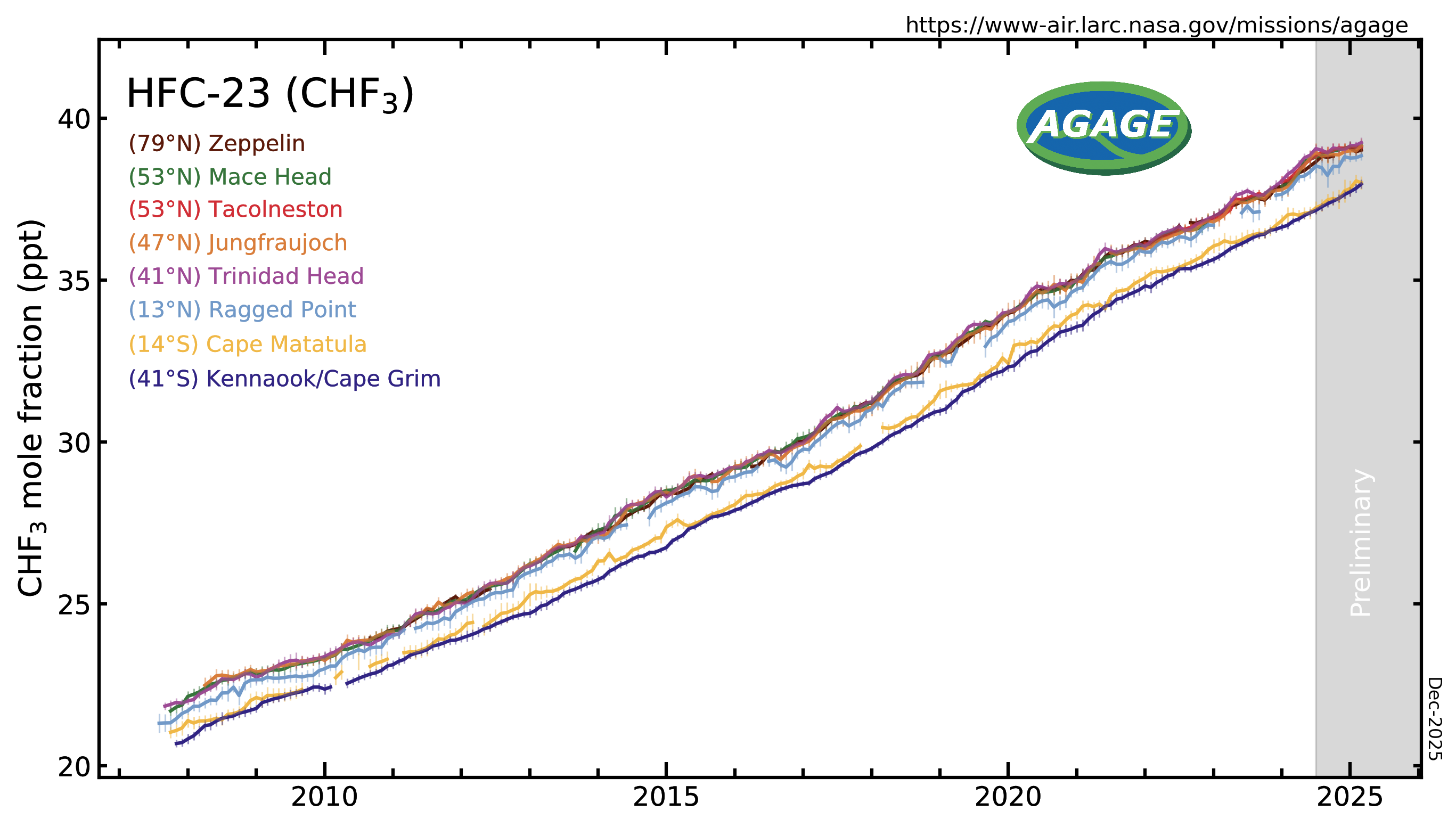
HFC-23 measured by the Advanced Global Atmospheric Gases Experiment (AGAGE) in the lower atmosphere (troposphere) at stations around the world. Abundances are given as pollution free monthly mean mole fractions in parts-per-trillion.

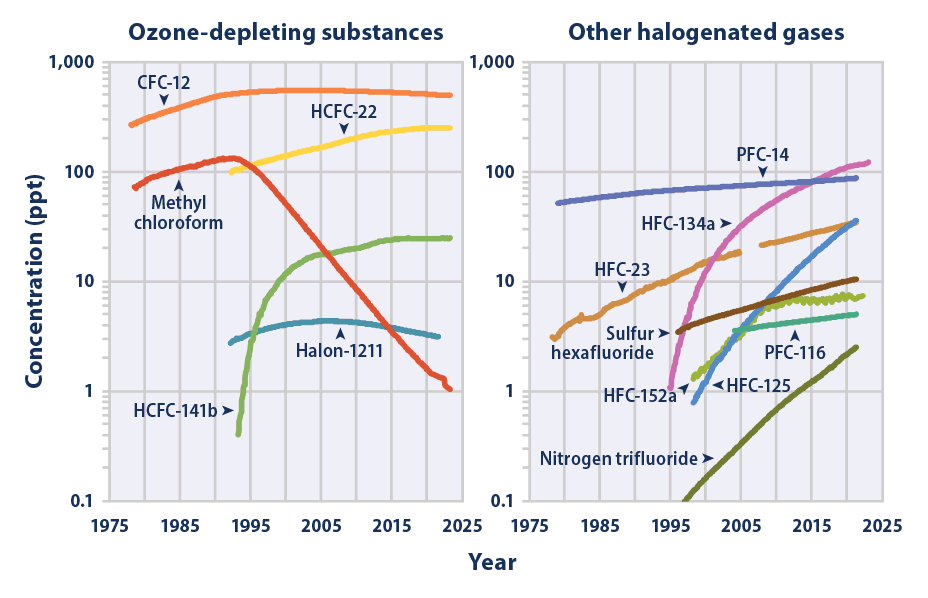
Atmospheric concentration of HFC-23 vs. similar man-made gases (right graph), log scale.

CHF_{3} is a potent greenhouse gas. A ton of HFC-23 in the atmosphere has the same effect as 11,700 tons of carbon dioxide. This equivalency, also called a 100-yr global warming potential, is slightly larger at 14,800 for HFC-23. The atmospheric lifetime is 270 years.

HFC-23 was the most abundant HFC in the global atmosphere until around 2001, when the global mean concentration of HFC-134a (1,1,1,2-tetrafluoroethane), the chemical now used extensively in automobile air conditioners, surpassed those of HFC-23. Global emissions of HFC-23 have in the past been dominated by the inadvertent production and release during the manufacture of the refrigerant HCFC-22 (chlorodifluoromethane).

Substantial decreases in HFC-23 emissions by developed countries were reported from the 1990s to the 2000s: from 6-8 Gg/yr in the 1990s to 2.8 Gg/yr in 2007.

However, research in 2024 strongly indicates that the HFC-23 emission decrease is much less than has been reported and does not meet the internationally agreed Kigali Amendment of 2020.

The UNFCCC Clean Development Mechanism provided funding and facilitated the destruction of HFC-23.

Developing countries have become the largest producers of HCFC-23 in recent years according to data compiled by the Ozone Secretariat of the World Meteorological Organization. Emissions of all HFCs are included in the UNFCCCs Kyoto Protocol. To mitigate its impact, CHF_{3} can be destroyed with electric plasma arc technologies or by high temperature incineration.

== Additional physical properties ==
Property	Value
Density (ρ) at -100 °C (liquid)	1.52 g/cm^{3}
Density (ρ) at -82.1 °C (liquid)	1.431 g/cm^{3}
Density (ρ) at -82.1 °C (gas)	4.57 kg/m^{3}
Density (ρ) at 0 °C (gas)	2.86 kg/m^{3}
Density (ρ) at 15 °C (gas)	2.99 kg/m^{3}
Dipole moment	1.649 D
Critical pressure (p_{c})	4.816 MPa (48.16 bar)
Critical temperature (T_{c})	25.7 °C (299 K)
Critical density (ρ_{c})	7.52 mol/l
Compressibility factor (Z)	0.9913
Acentric factor (ω)	0.26414
Viscosity (η) at 25 °C	14.4 μPa.s (0.0144 cP)
Molar specific heat at constant volume (C_{V})	51.577 J.mol^{−1}.K^{−1}
Latent heat of vaporization (l_{b})	257.91 kJ.kg^{−1}

== Literature ==
- McBee E. T. (1947). "Fluorine Chemistry". Industrial & Engineering Chemistry. 39 (3): 236–237. doi:10.1021/ie50447a002.
- Oram D. E.; Sturges W. T.; Penkett S. A.; McCulloch A.; Fraser P. J. (1998). "Growth of fluoroform (CHF_{3}, HFC-23) in the background atmosphere". Geophysical Research Letters. 25 (1): 236–237. Bibcode:1998GeoRL..25...35O. doi:10.1029/97GL03483.
- McCulloch A. (2003). "Fluorocarbons in the global environment: a review of the important interactions with atmospheric chemistry and physics". Journal of Fluorine Chemistry. 123 (1): 21–29. Bibcode:2003JFluC.123...21M. doi:10.1016/S0022-1139(03)00105-2.
