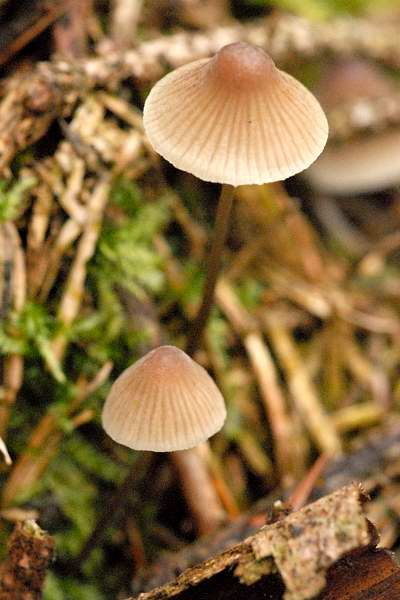

Scientific classification
- Domain: Eukaryota
- Kingdom: Fungi
- Division: Basidiomycota
- Class: Agaricomycetes
- Order: Agaricales
- Family: Mycenaceae
- Genus: Mycena
- Species: M. flavescens

Binomial name
- Mycena flavescens Velen. (1920)

= Mycena flavescens =

Species of fungus

Mycena flavescens Mycological characteristics
- Gills on hymenium
- Cap is conical or campanulate
- Hymenium is adnexed
- Stipe is bare
- Spore print is white
- Ecology is saprotrophic
- Edibility is edible

Mycena flavescens is a species of Mycenaceae fungus. It was first described scientifically by the Czech mycologist Josef Velenovský in 1920, based on specimens collected in Mnichovice in 1915. The mushroom is edible.
