= Georges-Simon Serullas =

French pharmacist (1774–1832)

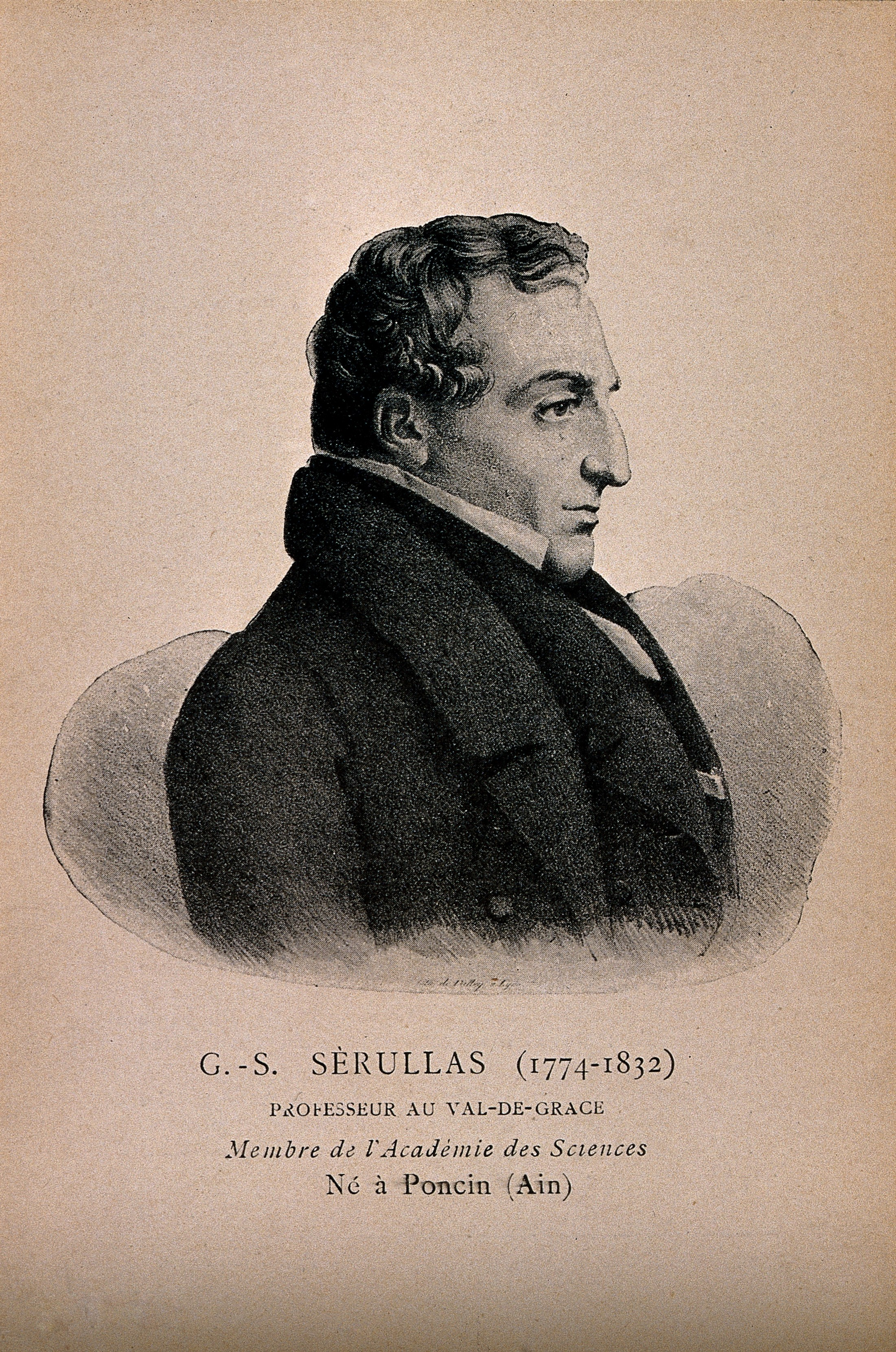

Georges-Simon Serullas (2 November 1774 in Poncin – 25 May 1832 in Paris) was a French pharmacist. He was a professor of pharmacy notable for being the first to publish a work on iodoform, an early antiseptic and disinfectant.

== Biography ==
He was a professor and head pharmacist at the hospital of Val-de-Grâce; professor of chemistry at the Jardin des Plantes (the chief botanical garden in France), and member of the French Academy of Sciences (elected December 28, 1829 - Chemistry section).

He was one of the first researchers to draw attention to the haloform reaction. In 1822, Serullas added potassium metal to a solution of iodine in ethanol and water to form potassium formate and iodoform, called in the language of that time hydroiodide of carbon, and used as an antiseptic.

He is buried in the Père Lachaise Cemetery (10th division).

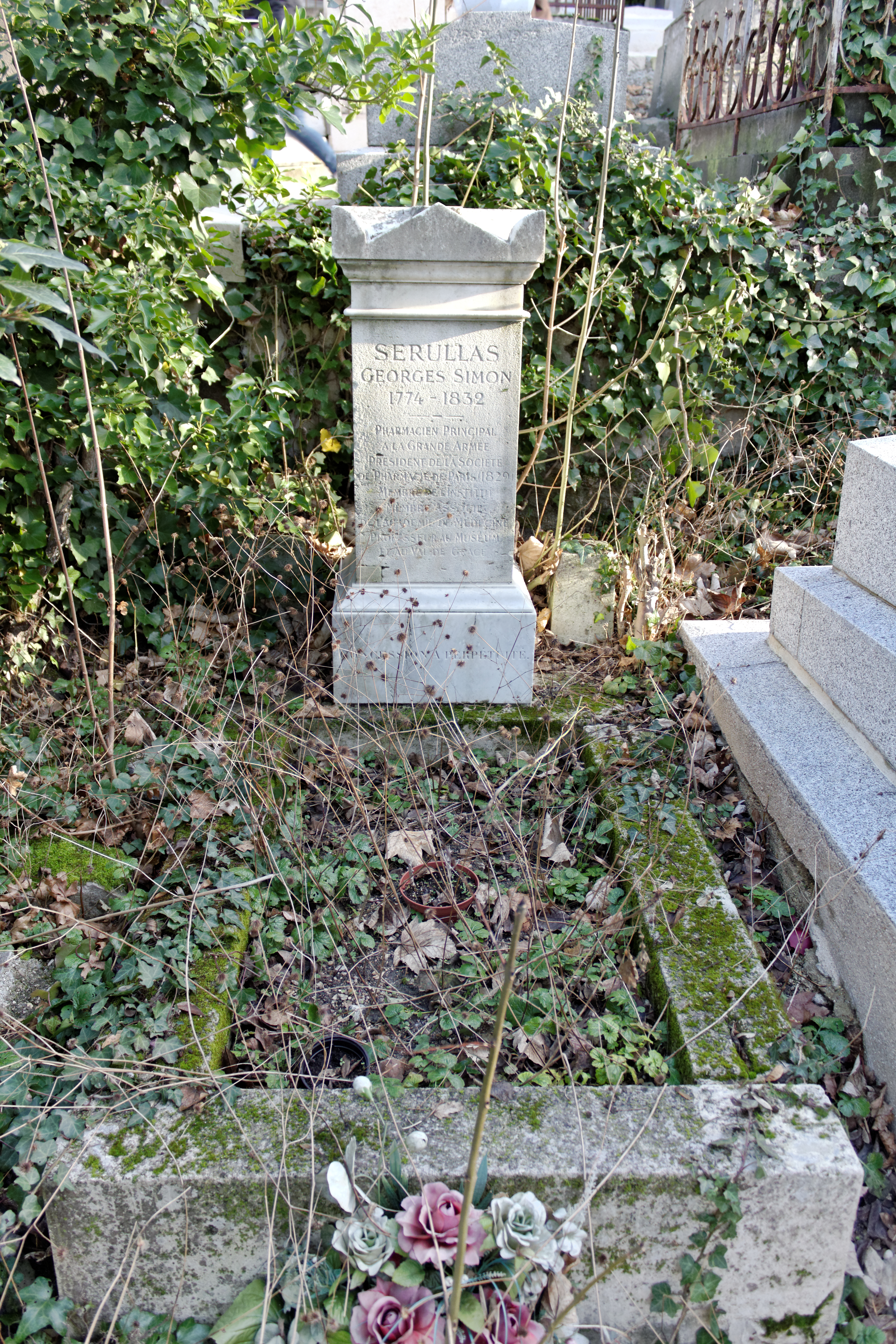
Tomb of Georges Simon Serullas at Père-Lachaise Cemetery

== Publications ==
- Observations physico-chimiques sur les alliages du potassium et du sodium avec d’autrs métaux; propriétés nouvelles de ces alliages servant à expliquer le phénomène de l’inflammation spontanée du pyrophore et la cause des mouvemens du camphre sur l’eau. Antimoine arsenical dans le commerce. Metz, Antoine, September 1820.
- Second mémoire sur les alliages du potassium et sur l’existence de l’arsenic dans les préparations antimoniales usitées en médecine. Metz, Antoine, May 1821.
