= Sodium deuteroxide =

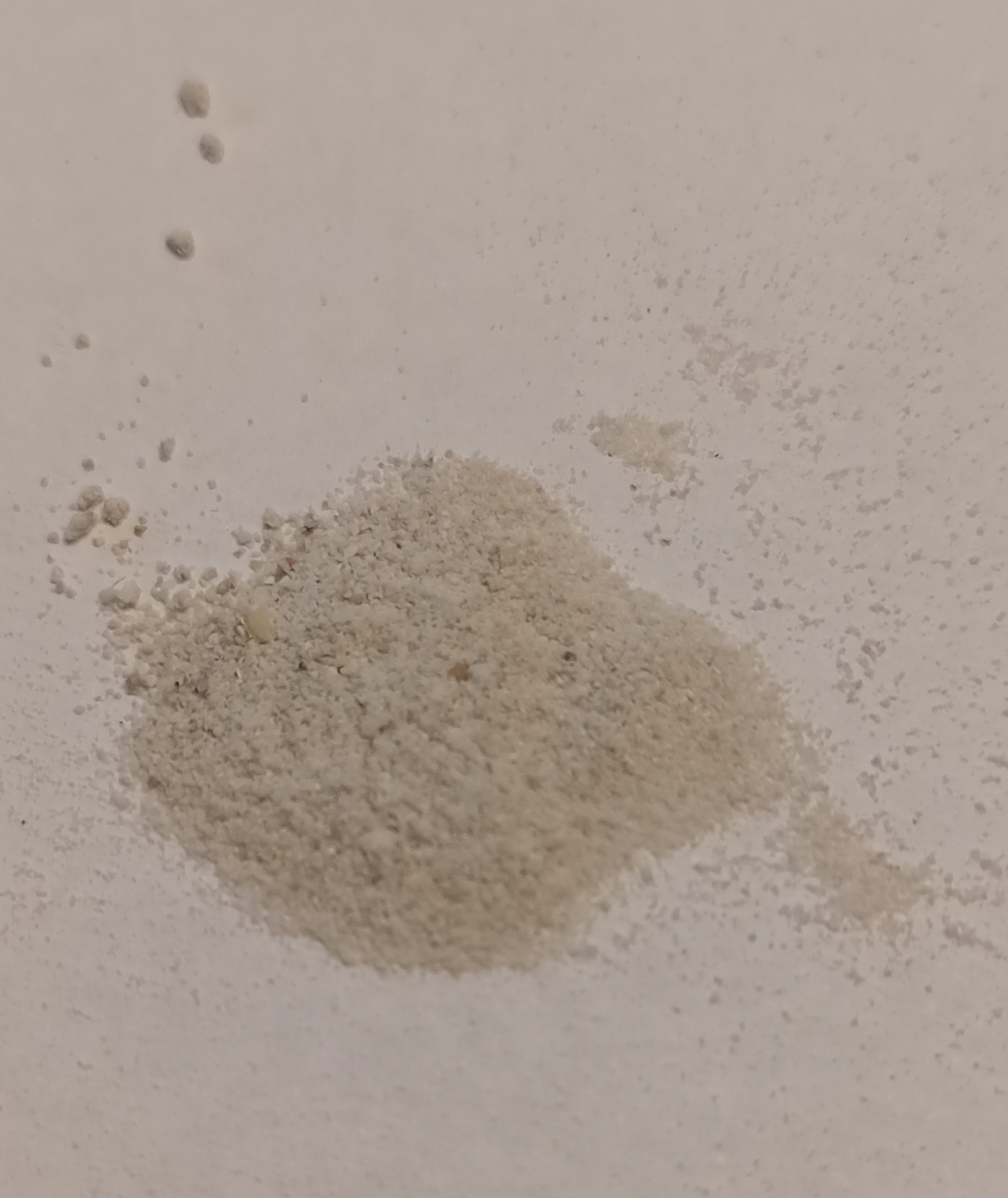

Names
- IUPAC name Sodium deuteroxide
- Other names: Deuterated sodium hydroxide; Sodium hydroxide-d

Identifiers
| CAS Number | 14014-06-3 |
| 3D model (JSmol) | Interactive image |
| ChemSpider | 9193979 |
| ECHA InfoCard | 100.034.373 |
| EC Number | 237-825-2 |
| PubChem CID | 23676750 |
| CompTox Dashboard (EPA) | DTXSID80930715 |
- InChI: InChI=1S/Na.H2O/h;1H2/q+1;/p-1/i/hD Key: HEMHJVSKTPXQMS-DYCDLGHISA-M
- SMILES: [Na+].[O-][2H]

Properties
| Chemical formula | NaOD or NaO^{2}H |
| Molar mass | 41.003 g·mol^{-1} |
| Appearance | White solid |
| Solubility in water | Soluble |

Hazards
- GHS labelling
| Pictograms | (GHS05: Corrosive) |
| Signal word | Danger |
| Hazard statements | H290, H314 |
| Precautionary statements | P260, P264, P280, P301+P330+P331, P303+P361+P353, P304+P340, P305+P351+P338, P310, P321, P363, P405, P501 |
| NFPA 704 (fire diamond) | 3 0 1 |

Related compounds
| Related compounds | Sodium hydroxide |
- Except where otherwise noted, data are given for materials in their standard state (at 25 °C [77 °F], 100 kPa). Infobox references

Sodium deuteroxide or deuterated sodium hydroxide is a chemical compound with the formula NaOD or NaO^{2}H. IUPAC recommends that the symbol for deuterium should be ^{2}H, although most chemists use the term NaOD. It is a white solid very similar to sodium hydroxide, of which it is an isotopologue. It is used as a strong base and deuterium source in the production of other deuterated compounds. For example, reaction with chloral hydrate gives deuterated chloroform, and reaction with N-nitrosodimethylamine gives the deuterated analog of that compound. Sodium deuteroxide is an ionic compound, consisting of sodium cations Na^{+} and deuteroxide anions OD^{−} or O^{2}H^{−}.
