= Chloroform =

CHCl3, historical anaesthetic and common solvent

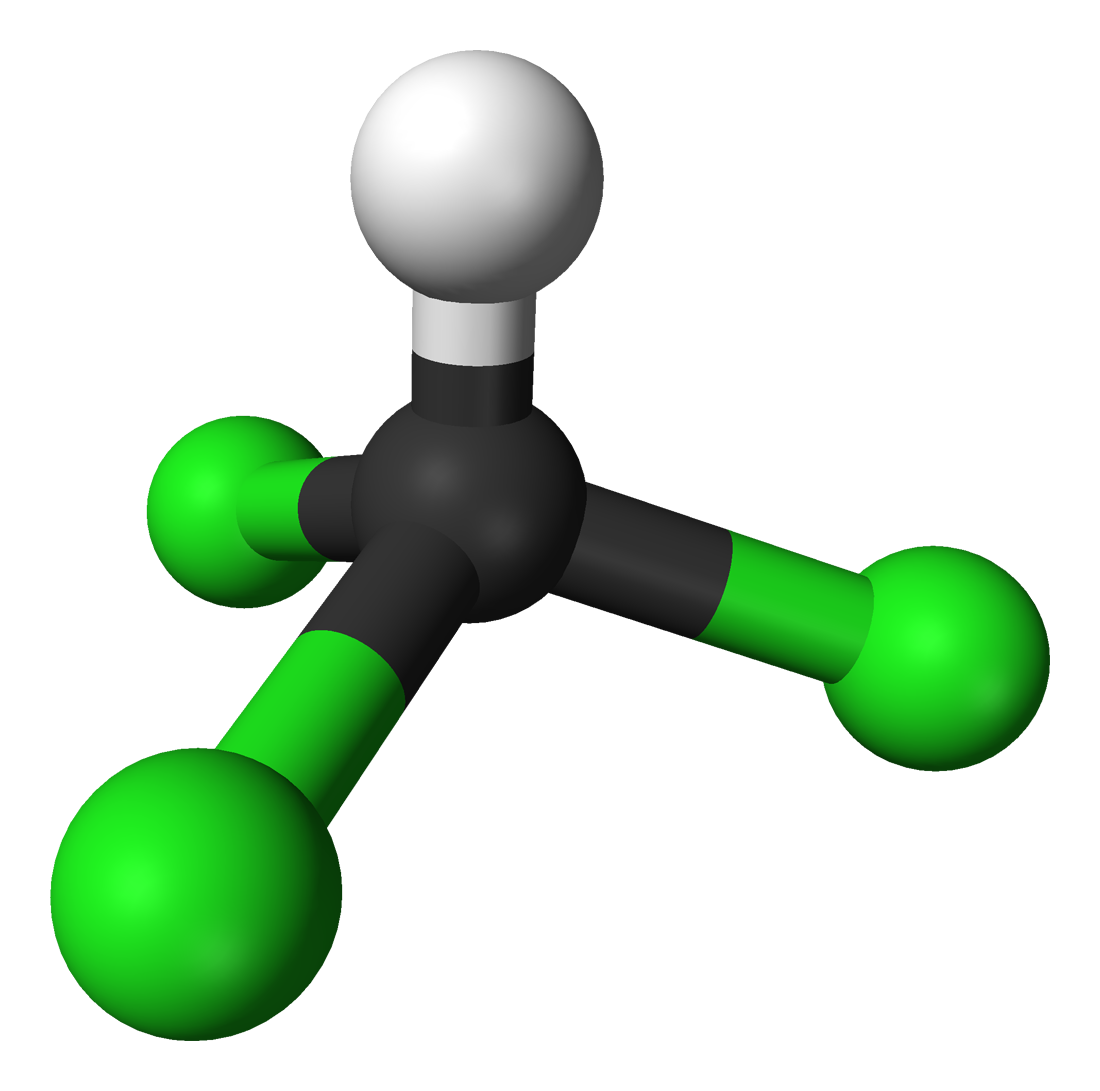

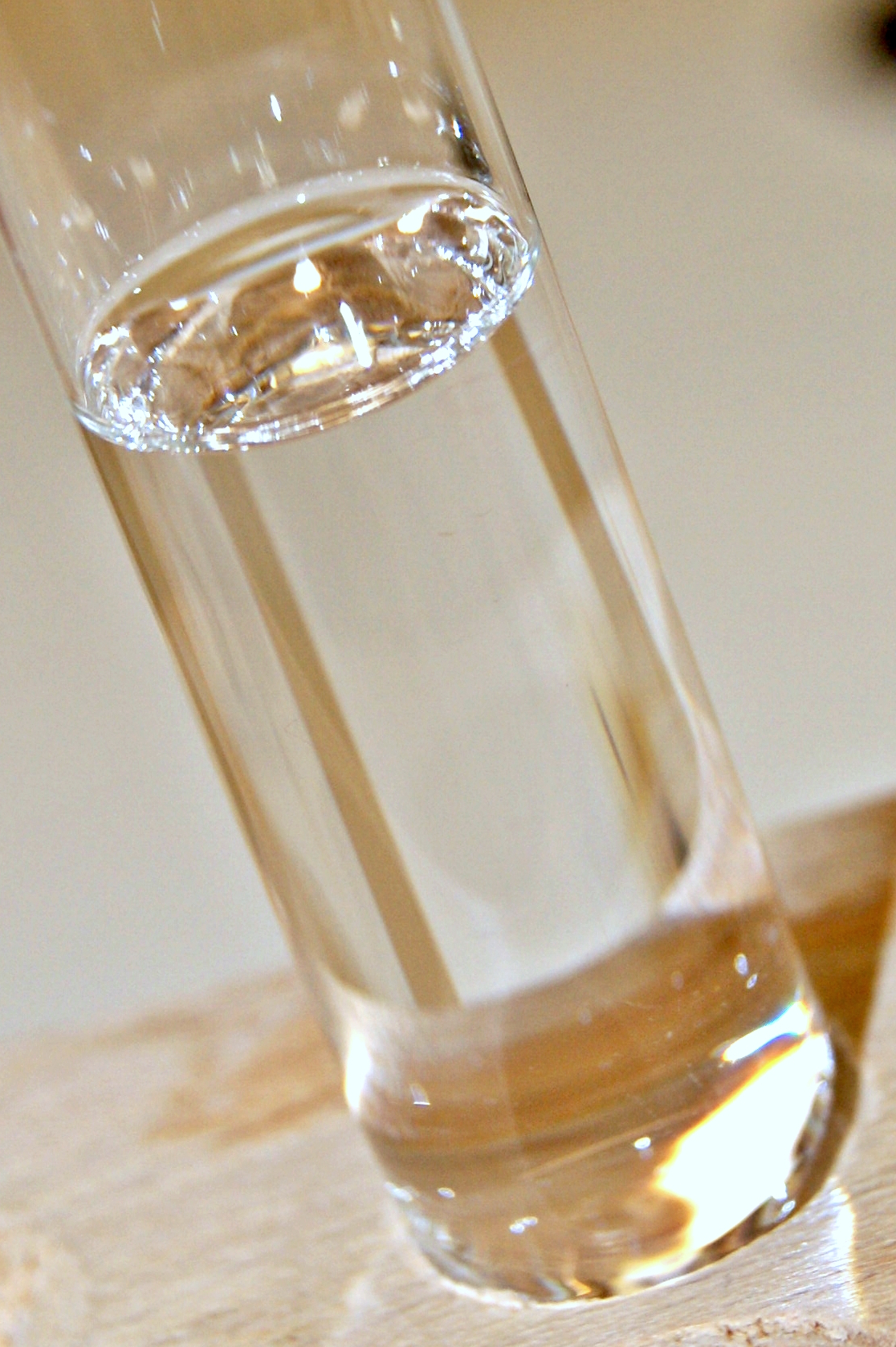
- Chloroform in its liquid state shown in a test tube

Names
- Preferred IUPAC name Trichloromethane
- Other names: Chloroformium; Freon 20; Methane trichloride; Methyl trichloride; Methenyl trichloride; Methenyl chloride; Refrigerant-20; terchloride/perchloride of formyle (archaic); Trichloretum Formylicum (Latin)

Identifiers
CAS Number	67-66-3
3D model (JSmol)	Interactive image
Abbreviations	R-20, TCM
ChEBI	CHEBI:35255
ChEMBL	ChEMBL44618
ChemSpider	5977
ECHA InfoCard	100.000.603
EC Number	200-663-8
KEGG	C13827
PubChem CID	6212
RTECS number	FS9100000
UNII	7V31YC746X
UN number	1888
CompTox Dashboard (EPA)	DTXSID1020306
- InChI: InChI=1S/CHCl3/c2-1(3)4/h1H Key: HEDRZPFGACZZDS-UHFFFAOYSA-N; InChI=1/CHCl3/c2-1(3)4/h1H Key: HEDRZPFGACZZDS-UHFFFAOYAG
- SMILES: ClC(Cl)Cl

Properties
Chemical formula	CHCl_{3}
Molar mass	119.37 g·mol^{−1}
Appearance	Highly refractive colorless liquid
Odor	Sweet, minty, pleasant
Density	1.564 g/cm^{3} (−20 °C); 1.489 g/cm^{3} (25 °C); 1.394 g/cm^{3} (60 °C)
Melting point	−63.5 °C (−82.3 °F; 209.7 K)
Boiling point	61.15 °C (142.07 °F; 334.30 K) decomposes at 450 °C
Solubility in water	10.62 g/L (0 °C); 8.09 g/L (20 °C); 7.32 g/L (60 °C)
Solubility	Soluble in benzene Miscible in diethyl ether, oils, ligroin, alcohol, CCl_{4}, CS_{2}
Solubility in acetone	≥ 100 g/L (19 °C)
Solubility in dimethyl sulfoxide	≥ 100 g/L (19 °C)
Vapor pressure	0.62 kPa (−40 °C); 7.89 kPa (0 °C); 25.9 kPa (25 °C); 313 kPa (100 °C); 2.26 MPa (200 °C)
Henry's law constant (k_{H})	3.67 L·atm/mol (24 °C)
Acidity (pK_{a})	15.7 (20 °C)
UV-vis (λ_{max})	250 nm, 260 nm, 280 nm
Magnetic susceptibility (χ)	−59.30·10^{−6} cm^{3}/mol
Thermal conductivity	0.13 W/(m·K) (20 °C)
Refractive index (n_{D})	1.4459 (20 °C)
Viscosity	0.563 cP (20 °C)

Structure
Molecular shape	Tetrahedral
Dipole moment	1.15 D

Thermochemistry
Heat capacity (C)	114.25 J/(mol·K)
Std molar entropy (S^{⦵}_{298})	202.9 J/(mol·K)
Std enthalpy of formation (Δ_{f}H^{⦵}_{298})	−134.3 kJ/mol
Gibbs free energy (Δ_{f}G^{⦵})	−71.1 kJ/mol
Std enthalpy of combustion (Δ_{c}H^{⦵}_{298})	473.21 kJ/mol

Pharmacology
ATC code	N01AB02 (WHO)

Hazards
- Occupational safety and health (OHS/OSH)
Main hazards	Decomposes into phosgene and hydrogen chloride in presence of heat – likely carcinogenic – reproductive toxicity – hepatotoxic
- GHS labelling
Pictograms	(GHS06: Toxic) (GHS08: Health hazard)
Signal word	Danger
Hazard statements	H302, H315, H319, H331, H336, H351, H361d, H372
Precautionary statements	P201, P202, P235, P260, P264, P270, P271, P280, P281, P301+P330+P331, P302+P352, P304+P340, P305+P351+P338, P308+P313, P310, P311, P314, P332+P313, P337+P313, P362, P403+P233, P405, P501
NFPA 704 (fire diamond)	2 0 0
Flash point	Nonflammable
- Lethal dose or concentration (LD, LC)
LD_{50} (median dose)	704 mg/kg (mouse, dermal)
LC_{50} (median concentration)	47,702 mg/m^{3} (rat, 4 hr)
LC_{Lo} (lowest published)	20,000 ppm (guinea pig, 2 hr); 7,056 ppm (cat, 4 hr); 25,000 ppm (human, 5 min)
- NIOSH (US health exposure limits)
PEL (Permissible)	50 ppm (240 mg/m^{3})
REL (Recommended)	Ca ST 2 ppm (9.78 mg/m^{3}) [60-minute]
IDLH (Immediate danger)	500 ppm
- Safety data sheet (SDS)

Related compounds
Related compounds	Deuterated chloroform CDCl_{3}; Chloromethane CH_{3}Cl; Dichloromethane CH_{2}Cl_{2}; Tetrachloromethane CCl_{4}; Fluoroform CHF_{3}; Bromoform CHBr_{3}; Iodoform CHI_{3}; Chlorodifluoromethane CHF_{2}Cl; Dichlorofluoromethane CHFCl_{2}; Bromodichloromethane CHCl_{2}Br; Dibromochloromethane CHClBr_{2}; Bromodifluoromethane CHF_{2}Br; Dibromofluoromethane CHFBr_{2}

Supplementary data page
- Chloroform (data page)
- Except where otherwise noted, data are given for materials in their standard state (at 25 °C [77 °F], 100 kPa). verify (what is ?) Infobox references

Chloroform, or trichloromethane (often abbreviated as TCM), is an organochlorine compound and a trihalomethane with the formula CHCl_{3} and a common solvent. It is a volatile, colorless, sweet-smelling, dense liquid produced on a large scale as a precursor to refrigerants and polytetrafluoroethylene (PTFE). Chloroform was once used as an inhalational anesthetic between the 19th century and the first half of the 20th century. It is miscible with many solvents but it is only very slightly soluble in water (only 8 g/L at 20°C).

== Structure and name ==
The molecule adopts a tetrahedral molecular geometry with C_{3v} symmetry. The chloroform molecule can be viewed as a methane molecule with three hydrogen atoms replaced with three chlorine atoms, leaving a single hydrogen atom.

The name "chloroform" is a portmanteau of terchloride (tertiary chloride, a trichloride) and formyle, an obsolete name for the methylylidene radical (CH) derived from formic acid.

== Natural occurrence ==
Many kinds of seaweed produce chloroform, and fungi are believed to produce chloroform in soil. Abiotic processes are also believed to contribute to natural chloroform productions in soils, although the mechanism is still unclear.

== History ==
Chloroform was synthesized independently by several investigators c. 1831:

- Moldenhawer, a German pharmacist from Frankfurt an der Oder, appears to have produced chloroform in 1830 by mixing chlorinated lime with ethanol; however, he mistook it for Chloräther (chloric ether, 1,2-dichloroethane).
- Samuel Guthrie, a U.S. physician from Sackets Harbor, New York, also appears to have produced chloroform in 1831 by reacting chlorinated lime with ethanol, and noted its anaesthetic properties; however, he also believed that he had prepared chloric ether.
- Justus von Liebig carried out the alkaline cleavage of chloral. Liebig incorrectly states that the empirical formula of chloroform was C_{2}Cl_{5} and named it "Chlorkohlenstoff" ("carbon chloride").
- Eugène Soubeiran obtained the compound by the action of chlorine bleach on both ethanol and acetone.

In 1834, French chemist Jean-Baptiste Dumas determined chloroform's empirical formula and named it: "Es scheint mir also erweisen, dass die von mir analysirte Substanz, … zur Formel hat: C_{2}H_{2}Cl_{6}." (Thus it seems to me to show that the substance I analyzed … has as [its empirical] formula: C_{2}H_{2}Cl_{6}.). [Note: The coefficients of his empirical formula should be halved.] ... "Diess hat mich veranlasst diese Substanz mit dem Namen 'Chloroform' zu belegen." (This had caused me to impose the name "chloroform" upon this substance [i.e., formyl chloride or chloride of formic acid].)

In 1835, Dumas prepared the substance by alkaline cleavage of trichloroacetic acid.

In 1842, Robert Mortimer Glover in London discovered the anaesthetic qualities of chloroform on laboratory animals.

In 1847, Scottish obstetrician James Y. Simpson was the first to demonstrate the anaesthetic properties of chloroform (provided by local pharmacist William Flockhart of Duncan, Flockhart and company,) in humans, and helped to popularize the drug for use in medicine.

The application of chloroform remained dangerous, and many deaths occurred through accidental overdose. In 1848, English physician John Snow developed an inhaler that regulated the dosage.

By the 1850s, chloroform was being produced on a commercial basis. An apparatus that could apply it safely and controllably was invented by English physician Joseph Thomas Clover in 1862.

In Britain, about 750,000 doses a week were being produced by 1895, using the Liebig procedure, which retained its importance until the 1960s. Today, chloroform – along with dichloromethane – is prepared exclusively and on a massive scale by the chlorination of methane and chloromethane.

== Production ==
Industrially, chloroform is produced by heating a mixture of chlorine and either methyl chloride (CH_{3}Cl) or methane (CH_{4}). At 400–500 °C, free radical halogenation occurs, converting these precursors to progressively more chlorinated compounds:

CH_{4} + Cl_{2} → CH_{3}Cl + HCl
CH_{3}Cl + Cl_{2} → CH_{2}Cl_{2} + HCl
CH_{2}Cl_{2} + Cl_{2} → CHCl_{3} + HCl

Chloroform undergoes further chlorination to yield carbon tetrachloride (CCl_{4}):

CHCl_{3} + Cl_{2} → CCl_{4} + HCl

The output of this process is a mixture of the four chloromethanes: chloromethane, methylene chloride (dichloromethane), trichloromethane (chloroform), and tetrachloromethane (carbon tetrachloride). These can then be separated by distillation.

Chloroform may also be produced on a small scale via the haloform reaction between acetone and sodium hypochlorite:

3 NaOCl + (CH_{3})_{2}CO → CHCl_{3} + 2 NaOH + CH_{3}COONa

=== Deuterochloroform ===
Deuterated chloroform is an isotopologue of chloroform with a single deuterium atom. CDCl_{3} is a common solvent used in NMR spectroscopy. Deuterochloroform is produced by the reaction of hexachloroacetone with heavy water. The haloform process is now obsolete for production of ordinary chloroform. Deuterochloroform can also be prepared by reacting sodium deuteroxide with chloral hydrate.

=== Inadvertent formation of chloroform ===
The haloform reaction can also occur inadvertently in domestic settings. Sodium hypochlorite solution (chlorine bleach) mixed with common household liquids such as acetone, methyl ethyl ketone, ethanol, or isopropyl alcohol can produce some chloroform, in addition to other compounds, such as chloroacetone or dichloroacetone.

== Uses ==
In terms of scale, the most important reaction of chloroform is with hydrogen fluoride to give monochlorodifluoromethane (HCFC-22), a precursor in the production of polytetrafluoroethylene (Teflon) and other fluoropolymers:

CHCl_{3} + 2 HF → CHClF_{2} + 2 HCl

The reaction is conducted in the presence of a catalytic amount of mixed antimony halides. Chlorodifluoromethane is then converted to tetrafluoroethylene, the main precursor of Teflon.

=== Solvent ===
The hydrogen attached to carbon in chloroform participates in hydrogen bonding, making it a good solvent for many materials.

Worldwide, chloroform is also used in pesticide formulations, as a solvent for lipids, rubber, alkaloids, waxes, gutta-percha, and resins, as a cleaning agent, as a grain fumigant, and in fire extinguishers. CDCl_{3} is a common solvent used in NMR spectroscopy.

=== Refrigerant ===
Chloroform is used as a precursor to make R-22 (chlorodifluoromethane). This is done by reacting it with hydrofluoric acid (HF) which fluorinates the CHCl_{3} molecule and releases hydrochloric acid as a byproduct. Before the Montreal Protocol was enforced, most of the chloroform produced in the United States was used in the production of chlorodifluoromethane. However, its production remains high, as it is a key precursor of PTFE.

Although chloroform has properties such as a low boiling point, and a low global warming potential of only 31 (compared to the 1760 of R-22), which are appealing properties for a refrigerant, there is little information to suggest that it has seen widespread use as a refrigerant in any consumer products.

=== Lewis acid ===
In solvents such as CCl_{4} and alkanes, chloroform hydrogen bonds to a variety of Lewis bases. HCCl_{3} is classified as a hard acid, and the ECW model lists its acid parameters as E_{A} = 1.56 and C_{A} = 0.44.

=== Reagent ===
As a reagent, chloroform serves as a source of the dichlorocarbene intermediate CCl_{2}. It reacts with aqueous sodium hydroxide, usually in the presence of a phase transfer catalyst, to produce dichlorocarbene, CCl_{2}. This reagent effects ortho-formylation of activated aromatic rings, such as phenols, producing aryl aldehydes in a reaction known as the Reimer–Tiemann reaction. Alternatively, the carbene can be trapped by an alkene to form a cyclopropane derivative. In the Kharasch addition, chloroform forms the •CHCl_{2} free radical which adds to alkenes.

=== Anaesthetic ===
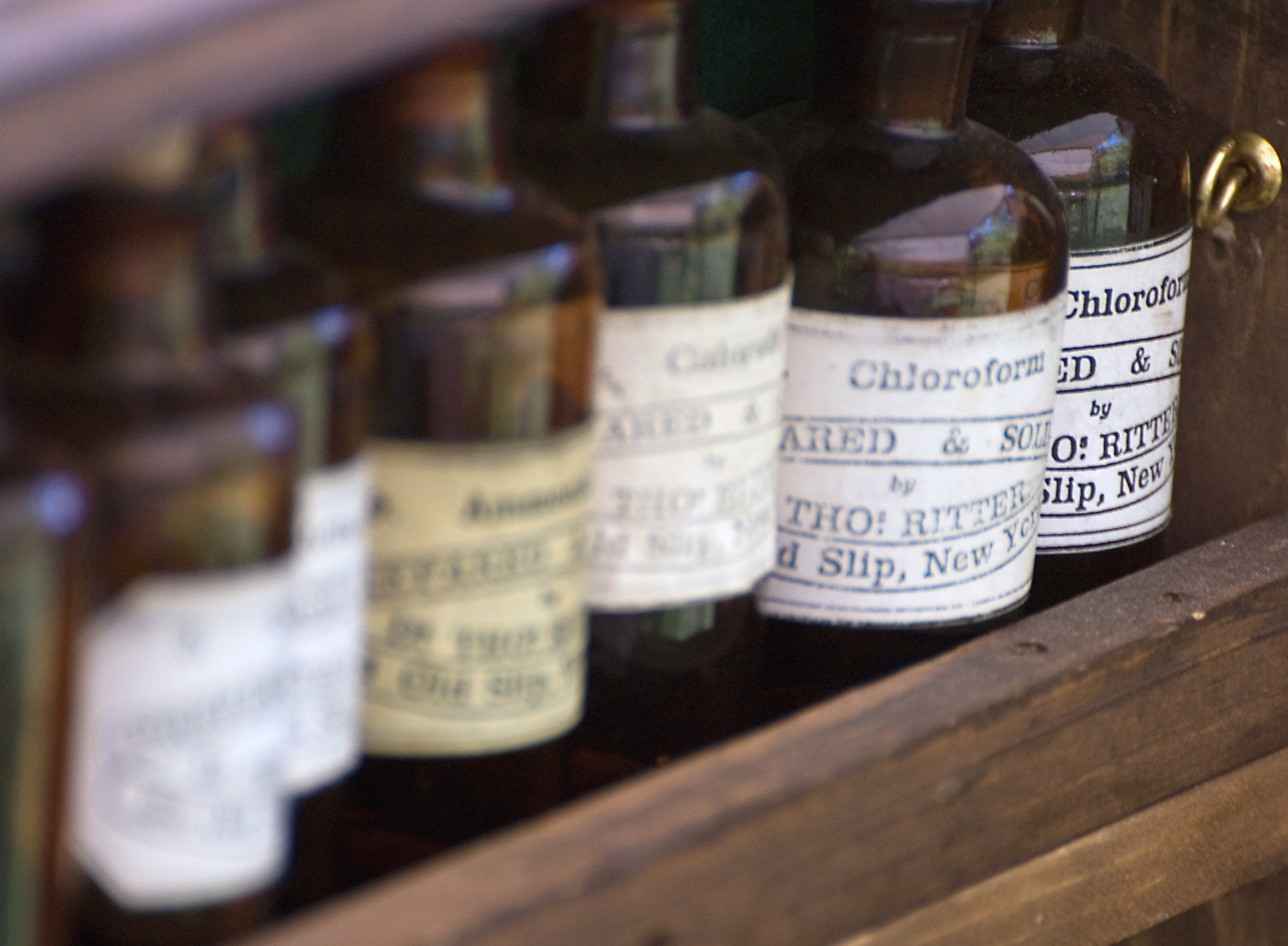
Antique bottles of chloroform

Chloroform is a powerful general anesthetic, euphoriant, anxiolytic, and sedative when inhaled or ingested. The anaesthetic qualities of chloroform were first described in 1842 in a thesis by Robert Mortimer Glover, which won the Gold Medal of the Harveian Society for that year. Glover also undertook practical experiments on dogs to prove and refine his theories, and subsequently presented them in his doctoral thesis at the University of Edinburgh in the summer of 1847, identifying anaesthetizing halogenous compounds as a "new order of poisonous substances".

James Young Simpson, a Scottish obstetrician, was one of those examiners required to read the thesis, but later claimed to have never read it and to have come to his own conclusions independently. Perkins-McVey, among others, have raised doubts about the credibility of Simpson's claim, noting that Simpson's publications on the subject in 1847 explicitly echo Glover's and, being one of the thesis examiners, Simpson was likely aware of the content of Glover's study, even if he skirted his duties as an examiner. In 1847 and 1848, Glover would pen a series of heated letters accusing Simpson of stealing his discovery, which had already earned Simpson considerable notoriety. Whatever the source of his inspiration, on 4 November 1847, Simpson argued that he had discovered the anaesthetic qualities of chloroform in humans. He and two colleagues entertained themselves by trying the effects of various substances, and thus revealed the potential for chloroform in medical procedures.

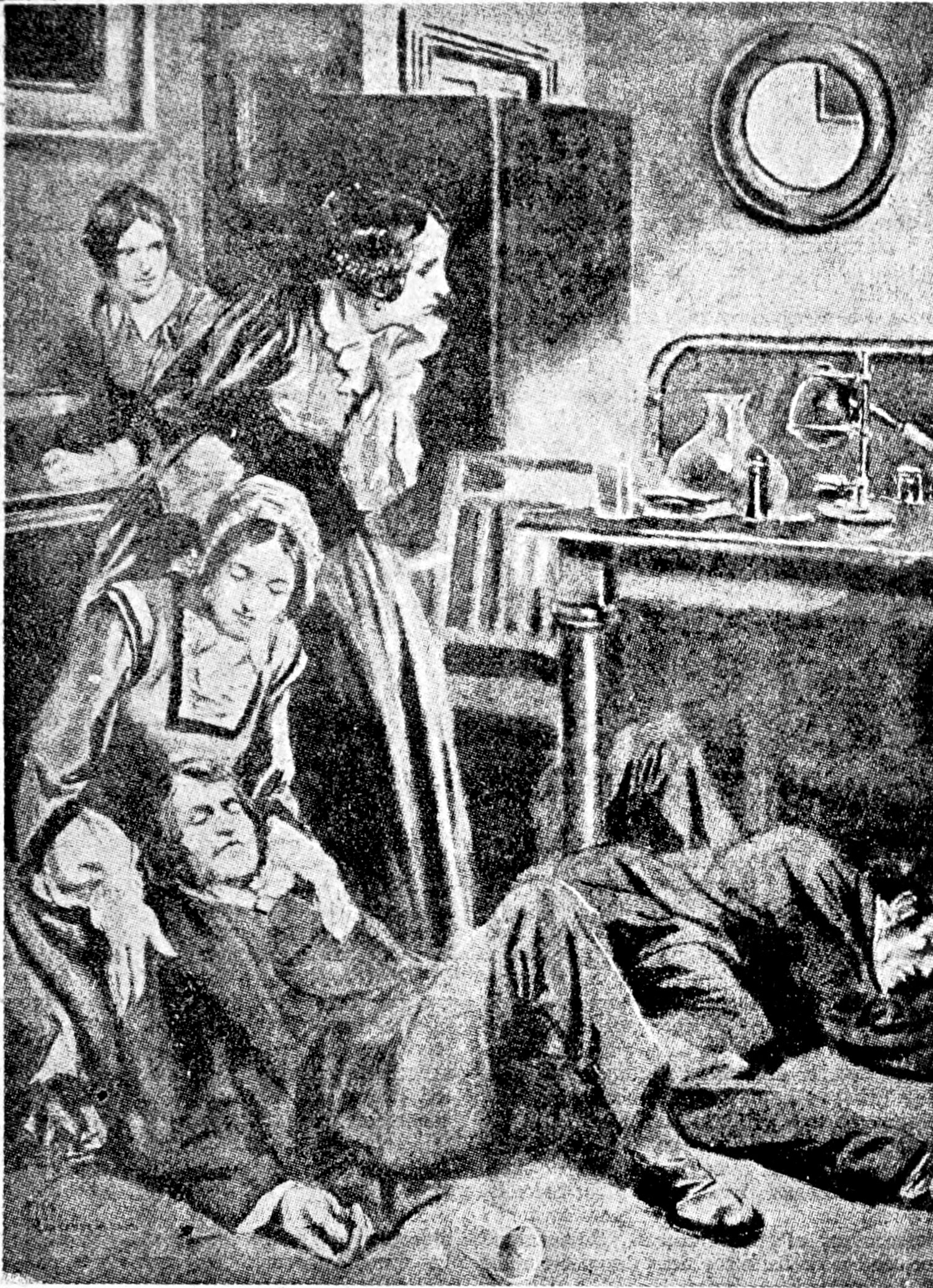
An illustration depicting James Young Simpson and his friends found unconscious.

A few days later, during the course of a dental procedure in Edinburgh, Francis Brodie Imlach became the first person to use chloroform on a patient in a clinical context.

In May 1848, Robert Halliday Gunning made a presentation to the Medico-Chirurgical Society of Edinburgh following a series of laboratory experiments on rabbits that confirmed Glover's findings and also refuted Simpson's claims of originality. The laboratory experiments that proved the dangers of chloroform were largely ignored.

The use of chloroform during surgery expanded rapidly in Europe; in the 1850s chloroform was used by the physician John Snow during the births of Queen Victoria's last two children Leopold and Beatrice. In the United States, chloroform began to replace ether as an anesthetic at the beginning of the 20th century; it was abandoned in favor of ether on discovery of its toxicity, especially its tendency to cause fatal cardiac arrhythmias analogous to what is now termed "sudden sniffer's death". Some people used chloroform as a recreational drug or to attempt suicide. One possible mechanism of action of chloroform is that it increases the movement of potassium ions through certain types of potassium channels in nerve cells. Chloroform could also be mixed with other anesthetic agents such as ether to make C.E. mixture, or ether and alcohol to make A.C.E. mixture.

In 1848, Hannah Greener, a 15-year-old girl who was having an infected toenail removed, died after being given the anaesthetic. Her autopsy establishing the cause of death was undertaken by John Fife assisted by Robert Mortimer Glover. A number of physically fit patients died after inhaling it. In 1848, however, John Snow developed an inhaler that regulated the dosage and so successfully reduced the number of deaths. Joseph Thomas Clover improved on the design in 1862, further reducing the risk of accidental overdose.

The opponents and supporters of chloroform disagreed on the question of whether the medical complications were due to respiratory disturbance or whether chloroform had a specific effect on the heart. Between 1864 and 1910, numerous commissions in Britain studied chloroform but failed to come to any clear conclusions. It was only in 1911 that Levy proved in experiments with animals that chloroform can cause ventricular fibrillation. Despite this, between 1865 and 1920, chloroform was used in 80 to 95% of all narcoses performed in the UK and German-speaking countries. In Germany, comprehensive surveys of the fatality rate during anaesthesia were made by Gurlt between 1890 and 1897. At the same time in the UK the medical journal The Lancet carried out a questionnaire survey and compiled a report detailing numerous adverse reactions to anesthetics, including chloroform. In 1934, Killian gathered all the statistics compiled until then and found that the chances of suffering fatal complications under ether were between 1:14,000 and 1:28,000, whereas with chloroform the chances were between 1:3,000 and 1:6,000. The rise of gas anaesthesia using nitrous oxide, improved equipment for administering anesthetics, and the discovery of hexobarbital in 1932 led to the gradual decline of chloroform narcosis.

The latest reported anaesthetic use of chloroform in the Western world dates to 1987, when the last doctor who used it retired, about 140 years after its first use.

=== Recreational use ===
In the 1910s in England, a famous set of English aristocrats and intellectuals called The Coterie were known to use chloroform recreationally, often at extravagant parties. Margot Asquith, whose stepson Raymond Asquith was a member, recorded Lady Diana Cooper as having left a dinner party in a taxi to fetch chloroform from the chemist.

=== Criminal use ===
Chloroform has been used by criminals to knock out, daze, or murder victims. Joseph Harris was charged in 1894 with using chloroform to rob people. Serial killer H. H. Holmes used chloroform overdoses to kill his female victims. In September 1900, chloroform was implicated in the murder of the U.S. businessman William Marsh Rice. The serial killer John Wayne Gacy chloroformed many of his victims. Chloroform was deemed a factor in the alleged murder of a woman in 1991, when she was asphyxiated while asleep. In 2002, 13-year-old Kacie Woody was sedated with chloroform when she was abducted by David Fuller and during the time that he had her, before he shot and killed her. In a 2007 plea bargain, a man confessed to using stun guns and chloroform to sexually assault minors.

The use of chloroform as an incapacitating agent has become widely recognized, bordering on cliché, through the adoption by crime fiction authors of plots involving criminals' use of chloroform-soaked rags to render victims unconscious. However, it is nearly impossible to incapacitate someone using chloroform in this way. It takes at least five minutes of inhalation of chloroform to render a person unconscious. Most criminal cases involving chloroform involve co-administration of another drug, such as alcohol or diazepam, or the victim being complicit in its administration. After a person has lost consciousness owing to chloroform inhalation, a continuous volume must be administered, and the chin must be supported to keep the tongue from obstructing the airway, a difficult procedure, typically requiring the skills of an anesthesiologist. In 1865, as a direct result of the criminal reputation chloroform had gained, the medical journal The Lancet offered a "permanent scientific reputation" to anyone who could demonstrate "instantaneous insensibility", i.e. loss of consciousness, using chloroform.

== Safety ==
=== Exposure ===
Chloroform is formed as a by-product of water chlorination, along with a range of other disinfection by-products, and it is therefore often present in municipal tap water and swimming pools. Reported ranges vary considerably, but are generally below the current health standard for total trihalomethanes (THMs) of 100 μg/L.

Historically, chloroform exposure may well have been higher, owing to its common use as an anesthetic, as an ingredient in cough syrups, and as a constituent of tobacco smoke, where DDT had previously been used as a fumigant.

=== Pharmacology ===
Chloroform is well absorbed, metabolized, and eliminated rapidly by mammals after oral, inhalation, or dermal exposure. Accidental splashing into the eyes has caused irritation. Prolonged dermal exposure can result in the development of sores as a result of defatting. Elimination is primarily through the lungs as chloroform and carbon dioxide; less than 1% is excreted in the urine.

Chloroform is metabolized in the liver by the cytochrome P-450 enzymes, by oxidation to trichloromethanol and by reduction to the dichloromethyl free radical. Other metabolites of chloroform include hydrochloric acid and diglutathionyl dithiocarbonate, with carbon dioxide as the predominant end-product of metabolism.

Like most other general anesthetics and sedative-hypnotic drugs, chloroform is a positive allosteric modulator at GABA_{A} receptors. Chloroform causes depression of the central nervous system (CNS), ultimately producing deep coma and respiratory center depression. When ingested, chloroform causes symptoms similar to those seen after inhalation. Serious illness has followed ingestion of 7.5 g (0.26 oz). The mean lethal oral dose in an adult is estimated at 45 g (1.6 oz).

The anesthetic use of chloroform has been discontinued, because it caused deaths from respiratory failure and cardiac arrhythmias. Following chloroform-induced anesthesia, some patients suffered nausea, vomiting, hyperthermia, jaundice, and coma owing to hepatic dysfunction. At autopsy, liver necrosis and degeneration have been observed. The hepatotoxicity and nephrotoxicity of chloroform is thought to be due largely to phosgene, one of its metabolites.

=== Conversion to phosgene ===
Chloroform converts slowly in the presence of UV light and air to the extremely poisonous gas phosgene (COCl_{2}), releasing HCl in the process.

2 CHCl_{3} + O_{2} → 2 COCl_{2} + 2 HCl

To prevent accidents, commercial chloroform is stabilized with ethanol or amylene, but samples that have been recovered or dried no longer contain any stabilizer. Amylene has been found to be ineffective, and the phosgene can affect analytes in samples, lipids, and nucleic acids dissolved in or extracted with chloroform. When ethanol is used as a stabiliser for chloroform, it reacts with phosgene (which is soluble in chloroform) to form the relatively harmless diethyl carbonate ester:

2 CH_{3}CH_{2}OH + COCl_{2} → CO_{3}(CH_{2}CH_{3})_{2} + 2 HCl

Phosgene and HCl can be removed from chloroform by washing with saturated aqueous carbonate solutions, such as sodium bicarbonate. This procedure is simple and results in harmless products. Phosgene reacts with water to form carbon dioxide and HCl, and the carbonate salt neutralizes the resulting acid.

Suspected samples can be tested for phosgene using filter paper which when treated with 5% diphenylamine, 5% dimethylaminobenzaldehyde in ethanol, and then dried, turns yellow in the presence of phosgene vapour. There are several colorimetric and fluorometric reagents for phosgene, and it can also be quantified using mass spectrometry.

=== Regulation ===
Chloroform is suspected of causing cancer (i.e. it is possibly carcinogenic, IARC Group 2B) as per the International Agency for Research on Cancer (IARC) Monograph. There is no convincing evidence that chloroform causes cancer in humans.

It is classified as an extremely hazardous substance in the United States, as defined in Section 302 of the US Emergency Planning and Community Right-to-Know Act (42 U.S.C. 11002), and is subject to strict reporting requirements by facilities that produce, store, or use it in significant quantities.

== Bioremediation of chloroform ==
Some anaerobic bacteria use chloroform for respiration, termed organohalide respiration, converting it to dichloromethane.

== Gallery ==
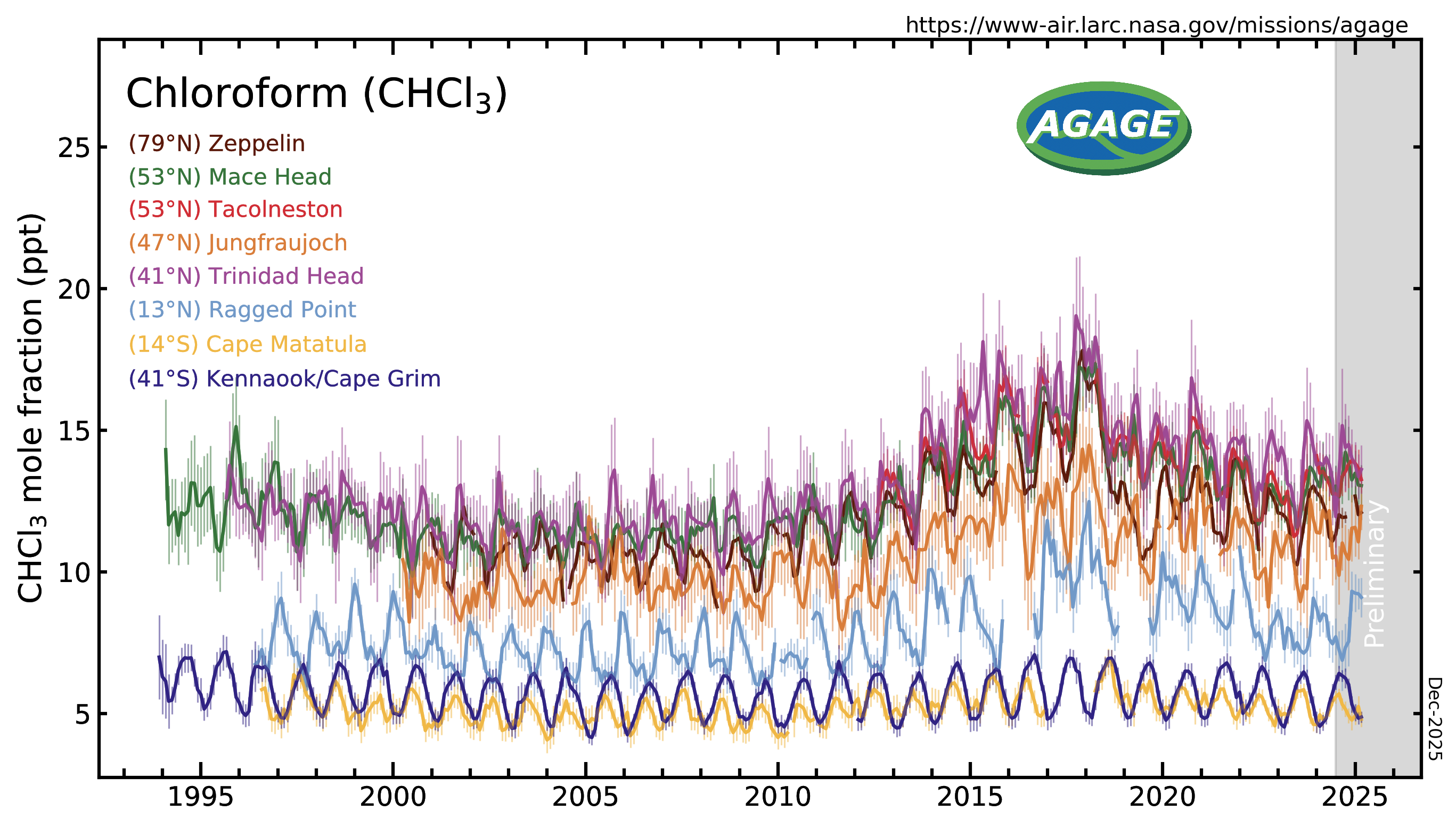
CHCl_{3} measured by the Advanced Global Atmospheric Gases Experiment (AGAGE) in the lower atmosphere (troposphere) at stations around the world. Abundances are given as pollution free monthly mean mole fractions in parts-per-trillion (ppt).
