= Bromodichloromethane =

- Chemical diagram

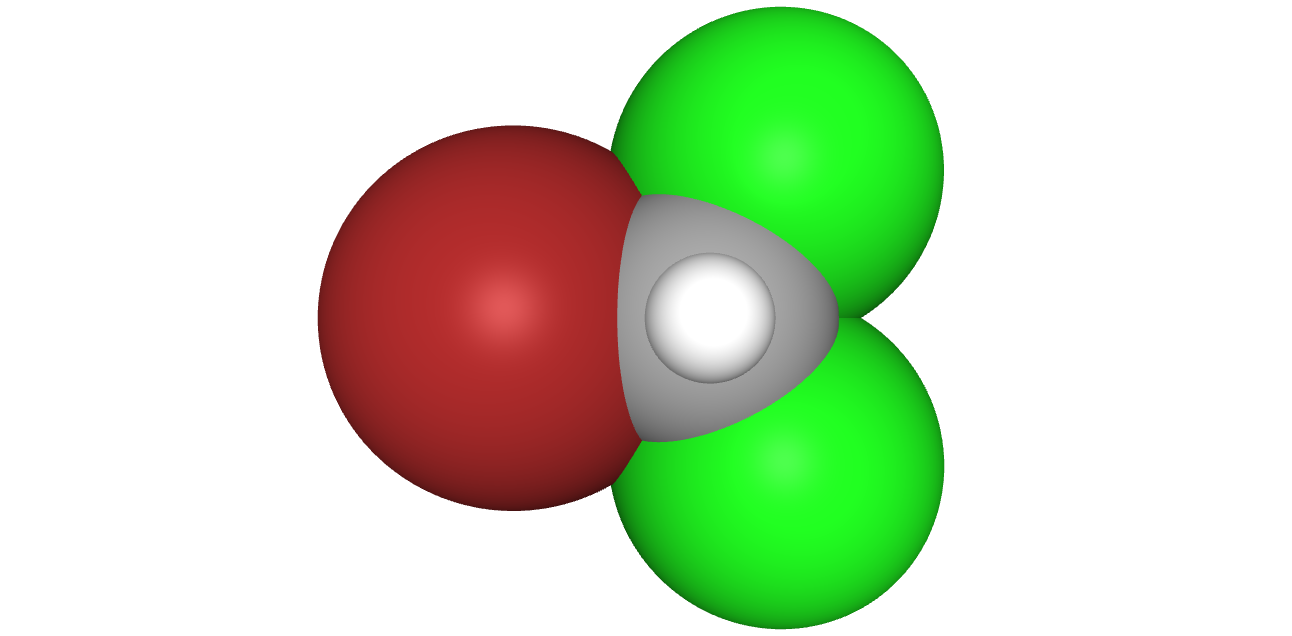
- Spacefill model

Names
- Preferred IUPAC name Bromo(dichloro)methane
- Other names Bromodichloromethane; Dichlorobromomethane

Identifiers
CAS Number	75-27-4
3D model (JSmol)	Interactive image
Beilstein Reference	1697005
ChEBI	CHEBI:34591
ChEMBL	ChEMBL346231
ChemSpider	6119
ECHA InfoCard	100.000.779
EC Number	200-856-7
Gmelin Reference	25941
KEGG	C14708
PubChem CID	6359
RTECS number	PA5310000
UNII	7LN464CH2O
UN number	2810 3082
CompTox Dashboard (EPA)	DTXSID1020198
- InChI: InChI=1S/CHBrCl2/c2-1(3)4/h1H Key: FMWLUWPQPKEARP-UHFFFAOYSA-N; InChI=1/CHBrCl2/c2-1(3)4/h1H Key: FMWLUWPQPKEARP-UHFFFAOYAR
- SMILES: BrC(Cl)Cl

Properties
Chemical formula	CHBrCl_{2}
Molar mass	163.8 g/mol
Appearance	Colorless liquid
Density	1.980 g/cm^{3}
Melting point	−57 °C (−71 °F; 216 K)
Boiling point	90 °C (194 °F; 363 K)
Solubility in water	4.5 g/L at 20 °C
Magnetic susceptibility (χ)	−66.3·10^{−6} cm^{3}/mol
Refractive index (n_{D})	1.4964

Hazards
- GHS labelling
Pictograms	(GHS07: Exclamation mark) (GHS08: Health hazard)
Signal word	Danger
Hazard statements	H302, H315, H319, H335, H350
Precautionary statements	P201, P202, P261, P264, P270, P271, P280, P281, P301+P312, P302+P352, P304+P340, P305+P351+P338, P308+P313, P312, P321, P330, P332+P313, P337+P313, P362, P403+P233, P405, P501
- Except where otherwise noted, data are given for materials in their standard state (at 25 °C [77 °F], 100 kPa). verify (what is ?) Infobox references

Bromodichloromethane is a trihalomethane with formula CHBrCl_{2}. It is a colorless, nonflammable liquid which will dissolve in water, or evaporate in air. Most of the chemical is produced through the chlorine disinfection process, and as a result it can occur in municipally-treated drinking water. It is also produced in small quantities by oceanic algae. According to the CDC, levels normal in drinking water are not known to cause health problems, but it has been classified by the US EPA as a probable human carcinogen.

Bromodichloromethane has formerly been used as a flame retardant, and a solvent for fats and waxes and for mineral ore separation. Now it is only used as a reagent or intermediate in organic chemistry. In the US it is only produced in small quantities, which are used for these chemical reasons. For example, it can be used to produce phenyl(bromodichloromethyl)mercury, which is widely used in the production of dichlorocarbene. It can be prepared by treating a mixture of chloroform and bromoform with triethyl-benzylammonium chloride and sodium hydroxide.

== Toxicity ==
According to the CDC, as of 2020, levels that it is normal to be exposed to in drinking water are lower than levels known to cause health problems. A small number of studies have examined the effects of low levels of bromodichloromethane on people, but most were also exposed to other chemicals, so it may not be the only cause of reported health problems. Studies in animals with much higher levels of the chemical than what humans are normally exposed to have resulted in health problems. The effects of the chemical on children are unknown but expected to be the same as on adults.

As of 2020, the chemical (in sufficient quantities) is considered by the US Department of Health and Human Services to be reasonably anticipated to be a human carcinogen, and by the U.S. Environmental Protection Agency (EPA) to be a probable human carcinogen. No standards regulating its presence in drinking water currently exist in the United States, though a limit of 80 ppb exists for the total amount of trihalomethanes in general.
