= Trihalomethane =

Methane (CH4) derivative with 3 halogen substituents

In chemistry, trihalomethanes (THMs) are chemical compounds in which three of the four hydrogen atoms of methane (CH_{4}) are replaced by halogen atoms. Trihalomethanes with all the same halogen atoms are called haloforms. Many trihalomethanes find uses in industry as solvents or refrigerants. Some THMs are also environmental pollutants, and a few are considered carcinogenic.

== Table of common trihalomethanes ==
Common trihalomethanes (ordered by molecular weight)
Molecular formula	IUPAC name	CAS registry number	Common name	Other names	Molecule
CHF_{3}	trifluoromethane	75-46-7	fluoroform	Freon 23, R-23, HFC-23	Fluoroform
CHClF_{2}	chlorodifluoromethane	75-45-6	chlorodifluoromethane	R-22, HCFC-22	Chlorodifluoromethane
CHCl_{3}	trichloromethane	67-66-3	chloroform	R-20, methyl trichloride	Chloroform
CHBrCl_{2}	bromodichloromethane	75-27-4	bromodichloromethane	dichlorobromomethane, BDCM	Bromodichloromethane
CHBr_{2}Cl	dibromochloromethane	124-48-1	dibromochloromethane	chlorodibromomethane, CDBM	Dibromochloromethane
CHBr_{3}	tribromomethane	75-25-2	bromoform	methyl tribromide	Bromoform
CHI_{3}	triiodomethane	75-47-8	iodoform	methyl triiodide	Iodoform

== Industrial uses ==
Only chloroform has significant applications of the haloforms. In the predominant application, chloroform is required for the production of tetrafluoroethylene (TFE), precursor to teflon. Chloroform is fluorinated by reaction with hydrogen fluoride to produce chlorodifluoromethane (R-22). Pyrolysis of chlorodifluoromethane (at 550–750 °C) yields TFE, with difluorocarbene as an intermediate.

$$\ce{CHCl3 + 2 HF -> CHClF2 + 2 HCl}$$
$$\ce{2 CHClF2 -> C2F4 + 2 HCl}$$

=== Refrigerants and solvents ===
Trihalomethanes released to the environment break down faster than chlorofluorocarbons (CFCs), thereby doing much less damage to the ozone layer. Trifluoromethane and chlorodifluoromethane are both used as refrigerants. Chlorodifluoromethane is a refrigerant HCFC, or hydrochlorofluorocarbon, while fluoroform is an HFC, or hydrofluorocarbon. Fluoroform is not ozone depleting.

Chloroform is a common solvent in organic chemistry.

== Occurrence and production ==
The total global flux of chloroform through the environment is approximately 660000 tonnes per year, and about 90% of emissions are natural in origin. Many kinds of seaweed produce chloroform, and fungi are believed to produce chloroform in soil.

Most of the haloforms — specifically, chloroform (CHCl_{3}), bromoform (CHBr_{3}), and iodoform (CHI_{3}) — are easy to prepare through the haloform reaction, although this method does not lend itself to bulk syntheses. (Fluoroform (CHF_{3}) cannot be prepared in this manner.)

Chloroform is produced by heating mixtures of methane or methyl chloride with chlorine. Dichloromethane is a coproduct.

Bromochlorofluoromethane is one of the simplest possible stable chiral compounds, and is used for studies.

== Regulation ==
Trihalomethanes were the subject of the first drinking water regulations issued after passage of the U.S. Safe Drinking Water Act in 1974.

The EPA limits the total concentration of the four chief constituents (chloroform, bromoform, bromodichloromethane, and dibromochloromethane), referred to as total trihalomethanes (TTHM), to 80 parts per billion in treated water.

Traces of chloroform are produced in swimming pools.
