= Iodoform =

- Stereo, skeletal formula of iodoform with the explicit hydrogen added

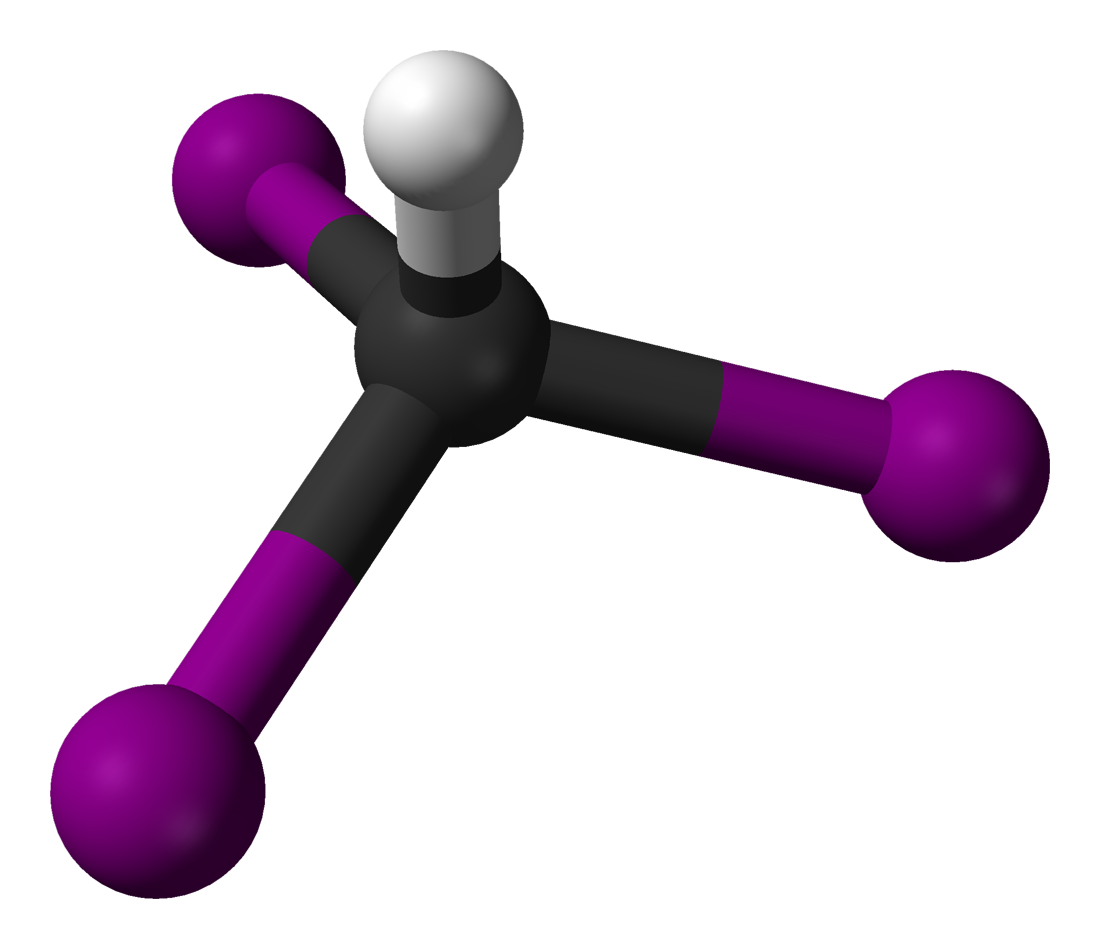
Ball and stick model of iodoform
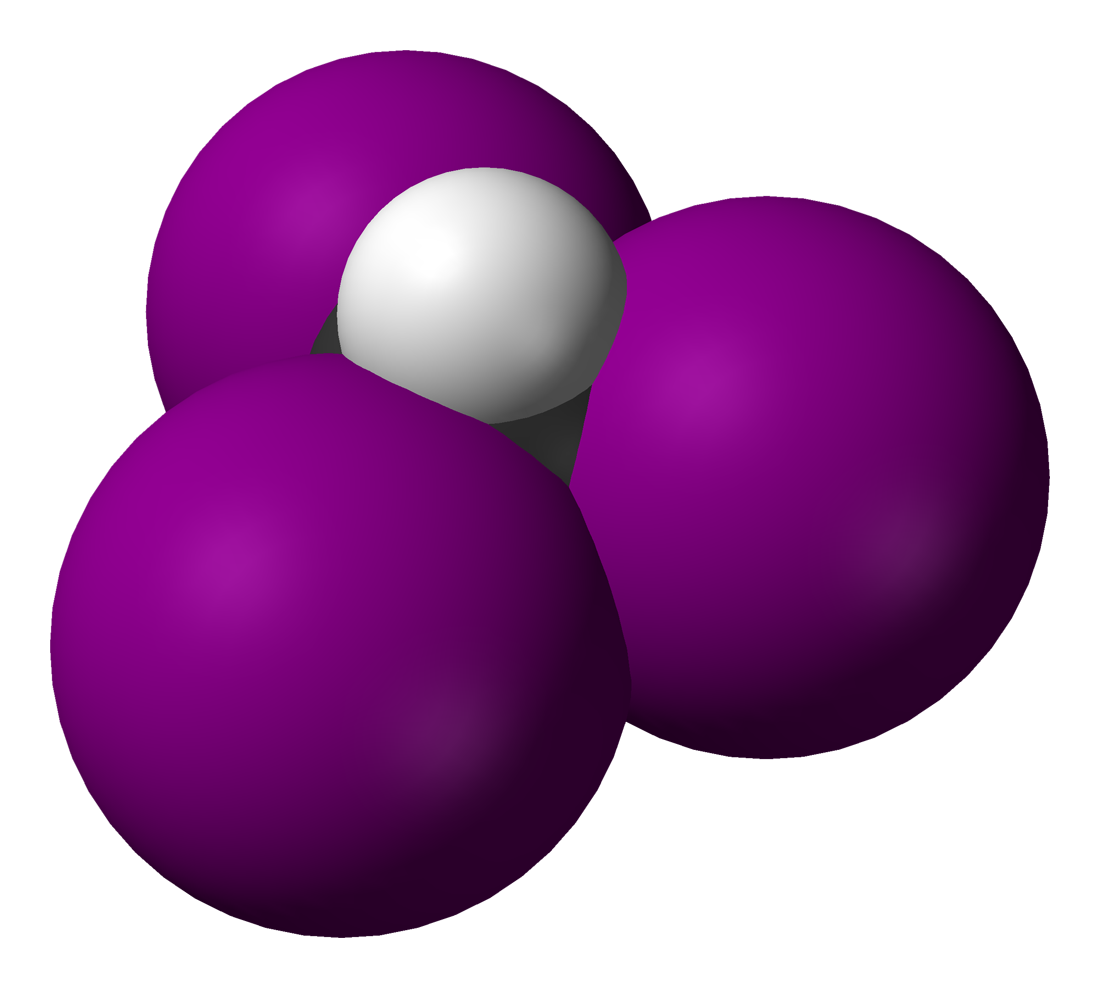

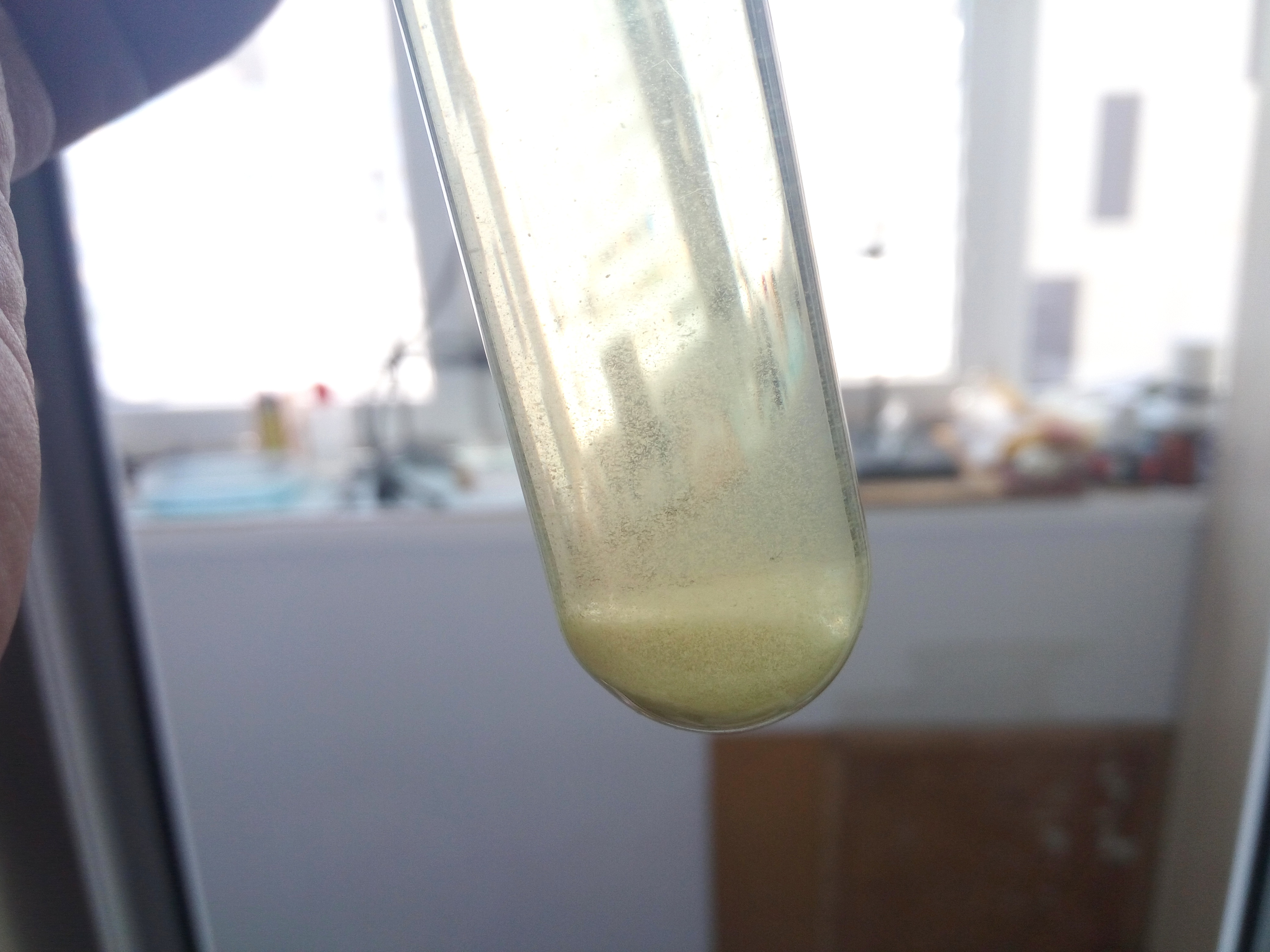
- Freshly made iodoform from an iodine tincture.

Names
- Preferred IUPAC name Triiodomethane
- Other names: Iodoform

Identifiers
CAS Number	75-47-8
3D model (JSmol)	Interactive image
Beilstein Reference	1697010
ChEBI	CHEBI:37758
ChEMBL	ChEMBL1451116
ChemSpider	6134
ECHA InfoCard	100.000.795
EC Number	200-874-5
KEGG	D01910
MeSH	iodoform
PubChem CID	6374
RTECS number	PB7000000
UNII	KXI2J76489
CompTox Dashboard (EPA)	DTXSID4020743
- InChI: InChI=1S/CHI3/c2-1(3)4/h1H Key: OKJPEAGHQZHRQV-UHFFFAOYSA-N
- SMILES: IC(I)I

Properties
Chemical formula	CHI_{3}
Molar mass	393.732 g·mol^{−1}
Appearance	Pale, light yellow, opaque crystals
Odor	Saffron-like, sweetish
Density	4.008 g/cm^{3}
Melting point	119 °C (246 °F; 392 K)
Boiling point	218 °C (424 °F; 491 K)
Solubility in water	100 mg/L
Solubility in diethyl ether	136 g/L
Solubility in acetone	120 g/L
Solubility in ethanol	78 g/L
log P	3.118
Henry's law constant (k_{H})	3.4 μmol·Pa^{−1}·kg^{−1}
Magnetic susceptibility (χ)	−117.1·10^{−6} cm^{3}/mol

Structure
Crystal structure	Hexagonal
Molecular shape	Tetrahedral at C

Thermochemistry
Heat capacity (C)	157.5 J/(K·mol)
Std enthalpy of formation (Δ_{f}H^{⦵}_{298})	180.1 – 182.1 kJ/mol
Std enthalpy of combustion (Δ_{c}H^{⦵}_{298})	−716.9 – −718.1 kJ/mol

Pharmacology
ATC code	D09AA13 (WHO)

Hazards
- GHS labelling
Pictograms	(GHS07: Exclamation mark)
Signal word	Warning
Hazard statements	H315, H319, H335
Precautionary statements	P261, P280, P305+P351+P338
NFPA 704 (fire diamond)	2 1 1
Flash point	204 °C (399 °F; 477 K)
- Lethal dose or concentration (LD, LC)
LD_{50} (median dose)	355 mg/kg (oral, rat); 1180 mg/kg (dermal, rat); 1.6 mmol/kg(s.c., mouse)
- NIOSH (US health exposure limits)
PEL (Permissible)	none
REL (Recommended)	0.6 ppm (10 mg/m^{3})
IDLH (Immediate danger)	N.D.

Related compounds
Related compounds	Methyl iodide; Diiodomethane; Carbon tetraiodide; Fluoroform; Chloroform; Bromoform
- Except where otherwise noted, data are given for materials in their standard state (at 25 °C [77 °F], 100 kPa). verify (what is ?) Infobox references

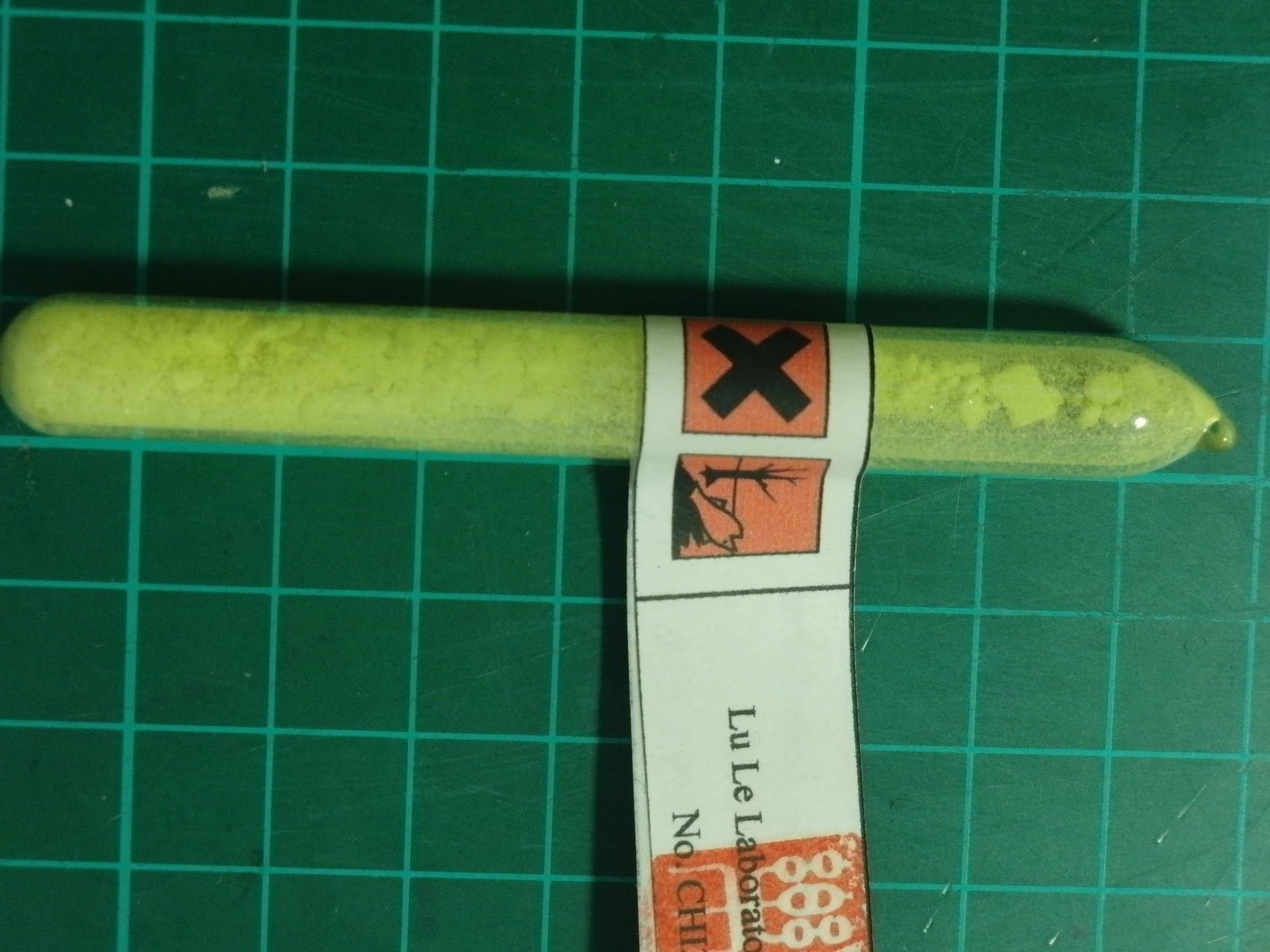
Iodoform stored in an ampoule

Iodoform (also known as triiodomethane) is the organoiodine compound with the chemical formula CHI_{3}. It is a pale yellow, crystalline, volatile substance, with a penetrating and distinctive sweetish and chloroform-like odor (in older chemistry texts, the smell is sometimes referred to as that of hospitals, where the compound is still commonly used) and, analogous to chloroform, sweetish taste. It is occasionally used as a disinfectant.

== Naming and structure ==
The name iodoform originates with the "formyle radical," an archaic term for the HC moiety, and is retained for historical consistency. A full, modern name is triiodomethane.

The molecule adopts a tetrahedral geometry with C_{3v} symmetry.

== Synthesis and reactions ==
The synthesis of iodoform was first described by Georges-Simon Serullas in 1822, by reactions of iodine vapour with steam over red-hot coals, and also by reaction of potassium with ethanolic iodine in the presence of water; and at much the same time independently by John Thomas Cooper. It is synthesized in the haloform reaction by the reaction of iodine and sodium hydroxide with any one of these four kinds of organic compounds: a methyl ketone (CH_{3}COR), acetaldehyde (CH_{3}CHO), ethanol (CH_{3}CH_{2}OH), and certain secondary alcohols (CH_{3}CHROH, where R is an alkyl or aryl group).

The reaction of iodine and base with methyl ketones is so reliable that the iodoform test (the appearance of a yellow precipitate) is used to probe the presence of a methyl ketone. This is also the case when testing for specific secondary alcohols containing at least one methyl group in alpha-position.

Some reagents (e.g. hydrogen iodide) convert iodoform to diiodomethane. Conversion to carbon dioxide is also possible. Iodoform reacts with aqueous silver nitrate to produce carbon monoxide. When treated with powdered elemental silver the iodoform is reduced, producing acetylene. Upon heating iodoform decomposes to produce diatomic iodine, hydrogen iodide gas, and carbon.

=== Natural occurrence ===
The angel's bonnet mushroom contains iodoform, and induces its characteristic odor.

== Applications ==
The compound finds small-scale use as a disinfectant. Around the beginning of the 20th century, it was used in medicine as a healing and antiseptic dressing for wounds and sores and, although this use is now largely superseded by safer antiseptics, it is still used in otolaryngology in the form of bismuth subnitrate iodoform paraffin paste (BIPP) as an antiseptic packing for cavities. It is the active ingredient in many ear powders for dogs and cats, along with zinc oxide and boric acid, which are used to prevent infection and facilitate removal of ear hair.

== See also ==
- Fluoroform
- Chloroform
- Bromoform
