= Dibromochlorofluoromethane =

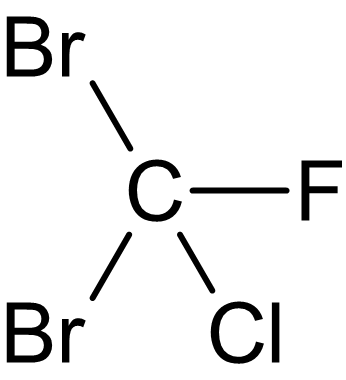

Names
- Preferred IUPAC name Dibromo(chloro)fluoromethane
- Other names: Dibromo-chloro-fluoromethane; Chlorodibromofluoromethane

Identifiers
CAS Number	353-55-9
3D model (JSmol)	Interactive image
ChemSpider	61027
ECHA InfoCard	100.209.965
EC Number	684-518-8
PubChem CID	67708
UNII	70HAL49YC6
CompTox Dashboard (EPA)	DTXSID70188809
- InChI: InChI=1S/CBr2ClF/c2-1(3,4)5 Key: HEDKQVNHJZBFQR-UHFFFAOYSA-N
- SMILES: C(F)(Cl)(Br)Br

Properties
Chemical formula	CBr_{2}ClF
Molar mass	226.27 g·mol^{−1}
Density	2.6 g/cm^{3}
Boiling point	78.9 °C (174.0 °F; 352.0 K)

Hazards
Flash point	1.5±18.4 °C

Related compounds
Related compounds	Bromochlorodifluoromethane; Bromodichlorofluoromethane; Bromochlorofluoromethane; Bromofluoroiodomethane; Bromodifluoroiodomethane; Bromofluorodiiodomethane; Chlorofluoroiodomethane; Chlorodifluoroiodomethane; Chlorofluorodiiodomethane
- Except where otherwise noted, data are given for materials in their standard state (at 25 °C [77 °F], 100 kPa). Infobox references

Dibromochlorofluoromethane is a tetrahalomethane with the chemical formula CBr_{2}ClF. This is an organic compound containing two bromine atoms, one fluorine atom, and one chlorine atom attached to the methane backbone.

== Synthesis ==
It can be prepared by reacting silver chlorobromoacetate with bromine at 180-260 °C, or by brominating fluorodichloromethane at 650 °C.

CBrClFCO_{2}Ag + Br_{2} → CBr_{2}ClF + CO_{2} + AgBr

== Uses ==
It can be used to introduce chlorofluoromethyl groups into organic compounds.
