= Bromodichlorofluoromethane =

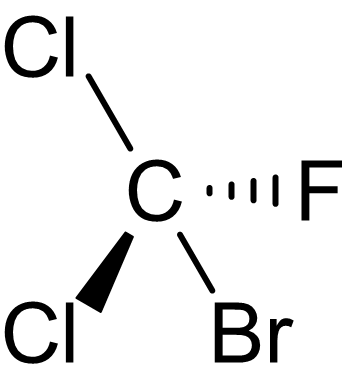

Names
- Preferred IUPAC name Bromo(dichloro)fluoromethane
- Other names Bromo-dichloro-fluoromethane

Identifiers
CAS Number	353-58-2
3D model (JSmol)	Interactive image
ChemSpider	9247
ECHA InfoCard	100.005.943
EC Number	206-536-3
PubChem CID	9624
UNII	IHD7R7A3OI
CompTox Dashboard (EPA)	DTXSID2074291
- InChI: InChI=1S/CBrCl2F/c2-1(3,4)5 Key: ARBYBCHKMDUXNE-UHFFFAOYSA-N
- SMILES: C(Br)(Cl)(Cl)F

Properties
Chemical formula	CBrCl_{2}F
Molar mass	181.81 g·mol^{−1}
Appearance	liquid
Density	2.1 g/cm^{3}
Melting point	−159.5 °C (−255.1 °F; 113.6 K)
Boiling point	53.3 °C (127.9 °F; 326.4 K)

Hazards
Flash point	-14.0 °C

Related compounds
Related compounds	Chlorofluoroiodomethane; Chlorodifluoroiodomethane; Chlorofluorodiiodomethane
- Except where otherwise noted, data are given for materials in their standard state (at 25 °C [77 °F], 100 kPa). Infobox references

Bromodichlorofluoromethane is a tetrahalomethane with the chemical formula CCl_{2}BrF. This is a halomethane containing two chlorine atoms, one fluorine atom, and one bromine atom attached to the methane backbone.

== Synthesis ==
The compound can be obtained by bromination of dichlorofluoromethane at 475 °C, or by reacting silver dichlorofluoroacetate with bromine, or silver chlorobromofluoroacetate with chlorine:

CCl_{2}FCOOAg + Br_{2} → CBrCl_{2}F + CO_{2} + AgBr
CBrClFCOOAg + Cl_{2} → CBrCl_{2}F + CO_{2} + AgCl

== Chemical properties ==
Bromodichlorofluoromethane reacts with sodium iodide in acetone at 120 °C to produce dichlorofluoroiodomethane:

CBrCl_{2}F + NaI → CCl_{2}FI + NaBr
