= Bromofluorodiiodomethane =

Names
- Preferred IUPAC name Bromo(fluoro)diiodomethane
- Other names: Bromo-fluoro-diiodomethane; Fluorobromodiiodomethane

Identifiers
CAS Number	753-67-3
3D model (JSmol)	Interactive image
ChemSpider	24590924
PubChem CID	85994061
- InChI: InChI=1/CBrFI2/c2-1(3,4)5 Key: JJVQDAVWWKZORR-UHFFFAOYSA-N
- SMILES: C(F)(Br)(I)I

Properties
Chemical formula	CBrFI_{2}
Molar mass	364.722 g·mol^{−1}
Density	3.6 g/cm^{3}
Boiling point	176.6 °C (349.9 °F; 449.8 K)
Solubility in water	soluble

Hazards
Flash point	60.6 °C

Related compounds
Related compounds	Bromofluoroiodomethane; Dibromofluoroiodomethane; Bromodifluoroiodomethane; Chlorofluoroiodomethane; Chlorodifluoroiodomethane; Chlorofluorodiiodomethane
- Except where otherwise noted, data are given for materials in their standard state (at 25 °C [77 °F], 100 kPa). Infobox references

Bromofluorodiiodomethane is a tetrahalomethane with the chemical formula CBrFI_{2}. This is an organic compound containing two iodine atoms, one bromine atom, and one fluorine atom attached to the methane backbone.

== Synthesis ==
Bromofluorodiiodomethane can be obtained as a byproduct in the reaction of (dibromo-fluoromethyl)triphenylphosphonium bromide, formed from triphenylphosphine and CBr_{3}F in THF, with iodine in DMF.
