= Dibromofluoroiodomethane =

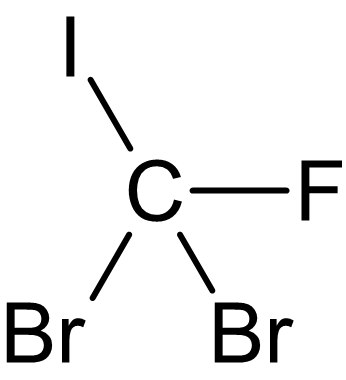

Names
- Preferred IUPAC name Dibromo(fluoro)iodomethane
- Other names Fluorodibromoiodomethane

Identifiers
CAS Number	1478-04-2
3D model (JSmol)	Interactive image
ChemSpider	24590926
PubChem CID	71351259
CompTox Dashboard (EPA)	DTXSID60776976
- InChI: InChI=1S/CBr2FI/c2-1(3,4)5 Key: NBMPIOUWRNYXES-UHFFFAOYSA-N
- SMILES: C(F)(Br)(Br)I

Properties
Chemical formula	CBrCl_{2}F
Molar mass	181.81 g·mol^{−1}
Density	3.3 g/cm^{3}
Boiling point	143.1 °C (289.6 °F; 416.2 K)

Hazards
Flash point	40.3 °C

Related compounds
Related compounds	Bromofluoroiodomethane; Bromodifluoroiodomethane; Bromofluorodiiodomethane; Chlorofluoroiodomethane; Chlorodifluoroiodomethane; Chlorofluorodiiodomethane
- Except where otherwise noted, data are given for materials in their standard state (at 25 °C [77 °F], 100 kPa). Infobox references

Dibromofluoroiodomethane is a tetrahalomethane with the chemical formula CBr_{2}FI. This is a halomethane containing two bromine atoms, one fluorine atom, and one iodine atom attached to the methane backbone.

== Synthesis ==
The compound can be obtained by reacting triphenyl(fluorodibromomethyl)indium bromide with iodine or iodine monobromide. Its byproducts include tribromofluoromethane and other halogenated methanes.

Dibromofluoroiodomethane can also be formed as the major product in the reaction of (dibromo-fluoromethyl) triphenylphosphonium bromide, obtained from triphenylphosphine and CBr_{3}F in THF, with iodine in tetraglyme.
