= Bromodifluoroiodomethane =

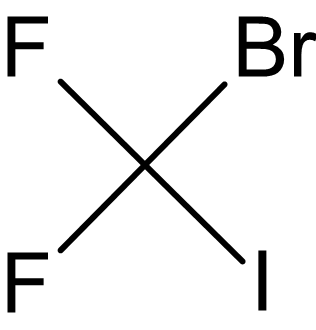

Names
- Preferred IUPAC name Bromo(difluoro)iodomethane
- Other names Bromo-difluoro-iodomethane

Identifiers
CAS Number	753-66-2
3D model (JSmol)	Interactive image
ChemSpider	9819316
PubChem CID	11644577
CompTox Dashboard (EPA)	DTXSID00469951
- InChI: InChI=1S/CBrF2I/c2-1(3,4)5 Key: CKZUZARCDKMQIT-UHFFFAOYSA-N
- SMILES: C(F)(F)(Br)I

Properties
Chemical formula	CBr_{2}ClF
Molar mass	226.27 g·mol^{−1}
Density	2.9 g/cm^{3}
Boiling point	60.9 °C (141.6 °F; 334.0 K)
Solubility in water	soluble

Hazards
Flash point	-9.4±18.4 °C

Related compounds
Related compounds	Bromofluoroiodomethane; Dibromofluoroiodomethane; Bromofluorodiiodomethane; Chlorofluoroiodomethane; Chlorodifluoroiodomethane; Chlorofluorodiiodomethane
- Except where otherwise noted, data are given for materials in their standard state (at 25 °C [77 °F], 100 kPa). Infobox references

Bromodifluoroiodomethane is a tetrahalomethane with the chemical formula CBrF_{2}I. This is an organic compound containing two fluorine atoms, one bromine atom, and one iodine atom attached to the methane backbone.

== Synthesis ==
The compound can be obtained by reacting trifluoromethyltrifluorooxirane with iodine monobromide (IBr) in the presence of nickel to a yield of 13%. It reacts with nitric oxide to produce dark blue nitrosobromodifluoromethane.

When difluorocarbene is formed in the presence of IBr, then bromodifluoroiodomethane is created as a byproduct.
