= Dichlorofluoroiodomethane =

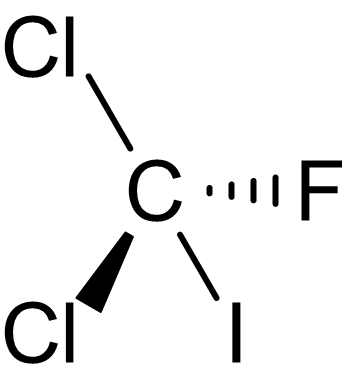

Names
- Preferred IUPAC name Dichloro(fluoro)iodomethane

Identifiers
CAS Number	420-48-4
3D model (JSmol)	Interactive image
ChemSpider	13221492
PubChem CID	23001916
CompTox Dashboard (EPA)	DTXSID00629513
- InChI: InChI=1S/CCl2FI/c2-1(3,4)5 Key: GOKDNAMGHVQFQQ-UHFFFAOYSA-N
- SMILES: ClC(Cl)(F)I

Properties
Chemical formula	CClF_{2}I
Molar mass	212.36 g·mol^{−1}
Density	2.5 g/cm^{3}
Melting point	−107 °C (−161 °F; 166 K)
Boiling point	90 °C (194 °F; 363 K)

Hazards
Flash point	7.7 °C

Related compounds
Related compounds	Chlorofluoroiodomethane; Chlorodifluoroiodomethane; Chlorofluorodiiodomethane
- Except where otherwise noted, data are given for materials in their standard state (at 25 °C [77 °F], 100 kPa). Infobox references

Dichlorofluoroiodomethane is a tetrahalomethane with the chemical formula CCl_{2}FI. This is a halomethane containing two chlorine atoms, one fluorine atom, and one iodine atom attached to the methane backbone.

== Synthesis ==
Dichlorofluoroiodomethane can be obtained by brominating dichlorofluoromethane to form bromodichlorofluoromethane, followed by halogen exchange with sodium iodide in acetone; or by reacting tris(dimethylamino)(dichlorofluoromethyl)iodonium chloride with iodine or iodine monochloride.

== Physical properties ==
Dichlorofluoroiodomethane is unstable at room temperature and readily releases iodine.
