= Difluorodiiodomethane =

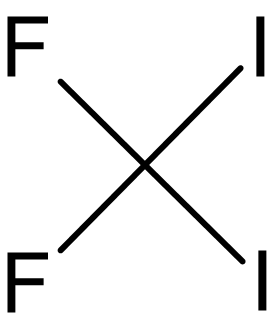

Names
- Preferred IUPAC name Difluoro(diiodo)methane
- Other names Diiododifluoromethane

Identifiers
CAS Number	1184-76-5
3D model (JSmol)	Interactive image
ChemSpider	2018740
ECHA InfoCard	100.220.511
EC Number	692-496-6
PubChem CID	2737095
CompTox Dashboard (EPA)	DTXSID00371828
- InChI: InChI=1S/CF2I2/c2-1(3,4)5 Key: SOEBNUZZZSSRNB-UHFFFAOYSA-N
- SMILES: C(F)(F)(I)I

Properties
Chemical formula	CF_{2}I_{2}
Molar mass	303.817 g·mol^{−1}
Appearance	pale yellow liquid
Density	3.2 g/cm³
Boiling point	89.4 °C (192.9 °F; 362.5 K)

Hazards
- GHS labelling
Pictograms	(GHS07: Exclamation mark)
Signal word	Warning
Hazard statements	H315, H319, H335
Precautionary statements	P261, P271, P280
Flash point	24.3 °C
- Except where otherwise noted, data are given for materials in their standard state (at 25 °C [77 °F], 100 kPa). Infobox references

Difluorodiiodomethane is a tetrahalomethane with the chemical formula CF_{2}I_{2}. This is a halomethane containing two fluorine atoms and two iodine atoms attached to the methane backbone.

== Synthesis ==
It can be prepared by reacting potassium difluorobromoacetate or methyl difluorobromoacetate with cuprous iodide, potassium iodide, and iodine in the DMF solution, or by reacting tetraiodomethane, 1,2-dichlorobenzene, and mercury fluoride.

CBrF_{2}CO_{2}K + KI + CuI + I_{2} → CF_{2}I_{2} + KBr + CO_{2}

== Chemical properties ==
In the presence of lead tetraacetate, it reacts with vinyltrimethylsilane to form (3,3-difluoro-1,3-diiodopropyl)trimethylsilane.

== Physical properties ==
The compound forms pale yellow liquid that decomposes slowly at room temperature and upon exposure to light, turning burgundy due to the liberation of iodine.
