= Freeze brand =

Technique for marking animals

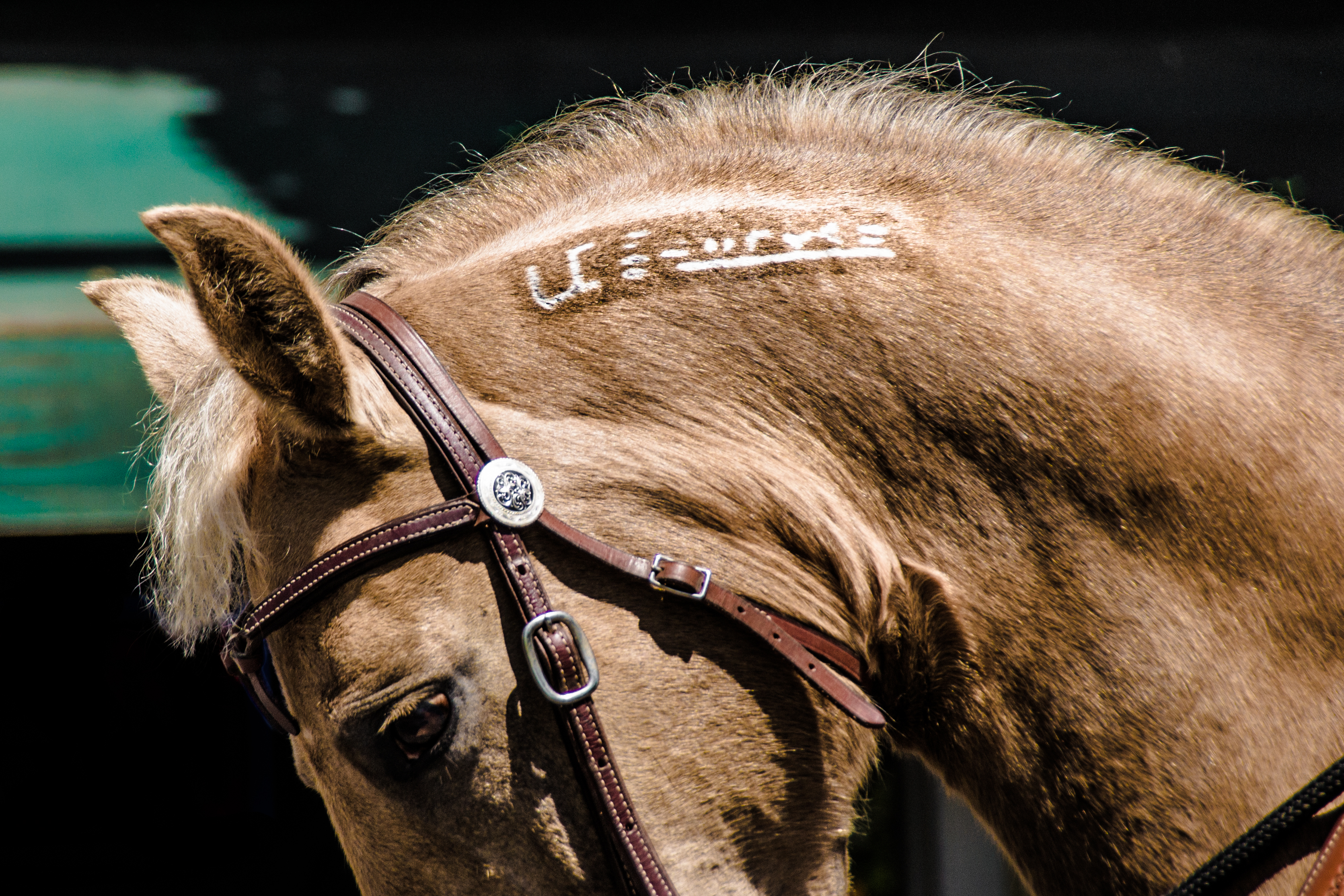
This mustang was captured by the Bureau of Land Management and freeze branded using the alpha-angle system. From left to right the brand says the horse is registered to the federal government, was born in the year 2000 and carries the registration number 012790, indicating that it was branded at a BLM facility in Oregon.

Freeze branding (sometimes called CryoBranding and the resulting brands, trichoglyphs) is a technique involving a cryogenic coolant instead of heat to produce permanent marks on a variety of animals.

The coolant is used to lower the temperature of a branding iron such that its application to shaved skin will permanently alter hair follicles. The intense cold destroys the pigmentation apparatus in the animal's hair follicles, leaving all subsequent hair growth without color. This creates a high-contrast, permanent mark in the shape of the branding iron's head. A longer application of the cold iron can also permanently remove hair and is used on white or pale animals. In these cases, the loss of hair leaves a patch of hairless skin in the shape of the brand.

The technique is most commonly used as an identification mark for ownership, although it finds application in biological studies of wild animals as well. Freeze branding is most often used on mammalian livestock with smooth coats such as cattle, donkeys and horses although it has been used successfully on a wide variety of other mammals, as well as frogs, newts, snakes, fish and even crabs.

Freeze branding is often seen as a more ethical alternative to traditional hot branding, so much so that experts have called for the prohibition of hot branding in favor of the cryogenic technique. Hot branding involves the use of an iron stamp heated to around 500 ºC (930 ºF), a temperature sufficient to destroy all three layers of an animal's skin and leave a permanent scar. This process is extremely painful and can traumatize the animal. Freeze branding gained popularity in the middle of the 20th century as a less painful way to permanently mark and identify animals. There has been debate as to whether freeze branding is truly less painful than hot branding, but scientific studies conducted to compare the relative pain of the two methods have concluded that freeze branding is indeed less distressing to the animal being marked.

Freeze brands are made for a variety of purposes. For example, they are used to indicate that an animal belongs to a particular herd, all members of which are marked with the same brand. They are also used to indicate via a unique pattern that an individual animal is a particular person's or ranch's property. Freeze branding is also used to tag wild animals that will be recaptured for later research.

== Conception and development ==
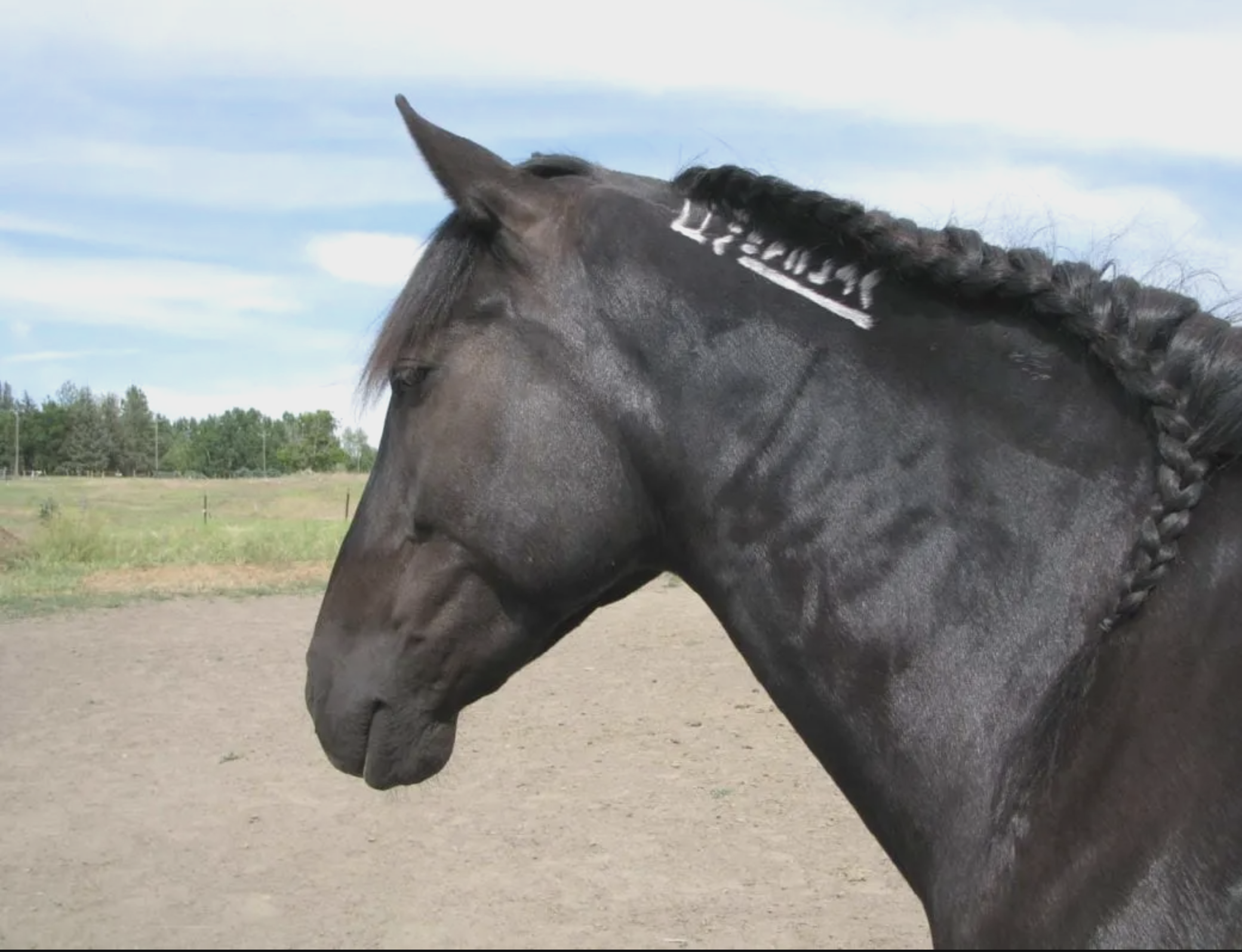
A mustang with a freeze brand that reads BLM 09 051649. This indicates the horse belongs to the Federal government, was born in 2009 and branded at a BLM facility in Oregon.

Freeze branding was conceived and developed in the mid-1960s by Prof. Roy Keith Farrell. He was then a lecturer at the Veterinary College housed within Washington State University Pullman. Farrell had been inspired by his failure to preserve viable cells under cryogenic conditions. He reasoned that if extremely cold temperatures could ruin cell viability in storage then these temperatures ought to be able to produce the same effect in a living animal, specifically the melanocytes that pigment the growing hair as it leaves the follicle.

This was the idea Farrell then tested on the College's herd animals. His success with a variety of subjects including cattle, dogs and squirrels and coolants such as dry ice and liquid nitrogen led him to promote the technique as Cryo-Branding. In 1968 Farrell received patent number 3,362,381 for his Cryo-Branding technique. He granted the Federal Government a permanent non-commercial license.

Beverly Pat Farrell, wife of the inventor, (both went by their middle names) would go on to create the popular Alpha-Angle Freeze Mark branding system in the early 1970s. For more on her invention, see Freeze brand § Pat Farrell's Alpha-Angle Freeze Mark below.

The cryo-branding technique was first used on a commercial scale under license from Farrell in 1966, initially in Sweden and the year after in the UK. Despite initial resistance from American cattle ranchers, who believed the white hair of a freeze brand could be dyed to confuse ownership, the technique has since become a popular means of marking animals for identification worldwide.

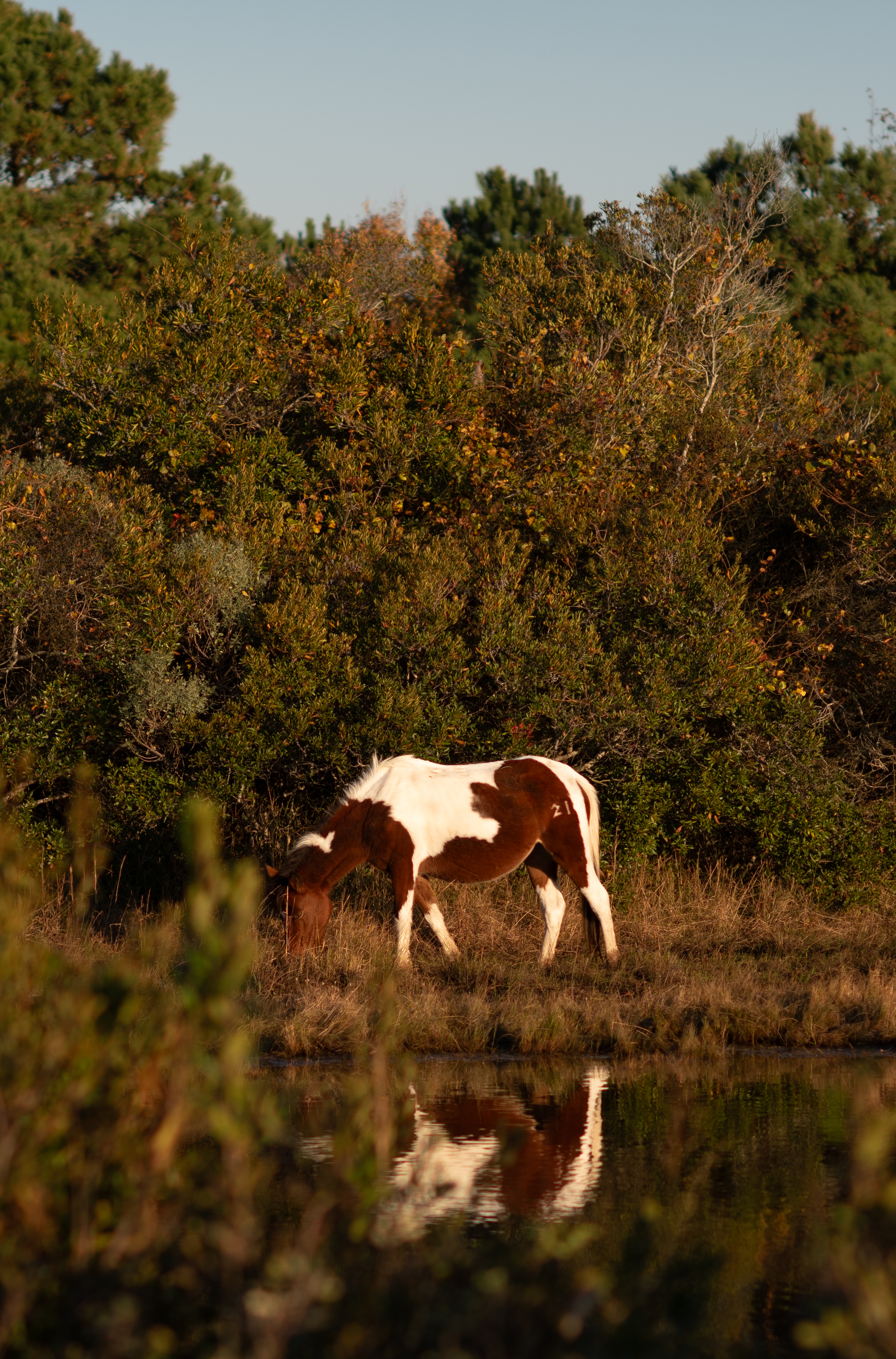
A Chincoteague pony on Assateague Island, Virginia with a control number freeze branded on its left hindquarter.

Freeze branding was rapidly adopted by European livestock operations, as dry ice and liquid nitrogen are easily procured there thanks to denser infrastructure and transport networks. The technique has also been embraced by many breeder associations such as the Arabian Horse Registry as a more humane method of permanently identifying animals. Cryo-branding has been especially welcomed by tanners, whose antipathy towards hot branding is as old as hot branding itself. Freeze branding does not damage the lower corium layer dividing skin from subcutaneous tissue. The far less extensive skin injury caused by freeze branding greatly reduces the persistence of the mark in finished leather. Tanners have often advocated for placing the brand on the cow's jaw rather than the haunches or the saddle, the source of the best quality leather on an animal's hide. Scientific studies have verified freeze branding as effective on the jaws of cattle. Jaw branding has the disadvantage of a cow's tendency to turn its head and return the gaze of a person trying to inspect its brand, hiding it from view.

Farrell continued searching for novel means of destroying pigmentation to create permanent marks on animals. In the early 1970s, he pioneered the use of lasers to brand fish while still underwater. He received a patent in 1975 for the method, which involved a bundle of fiber optic light channels held to a fish's side. The laser at the other end of the light channel was to be set in an adjustable frame such that its beam could track across the width of the fiber bundle, allowing it to brand simple designs on the fish. Farrell also validated the method for Dungeness crabs in 1973.

At a 1975 symposium, Farrell reported success in using freeze brands as a form of cryotherapy to treat various animal tumors. The greater mass of freeze brands was thought to render them more effective at destroying diseased or malignant tissue than conventional human cryotherapy, in which a coolant such as freon or liquid nitrogen is sprayed directly on the patient's skin. He lists malignant and nonmalignant tumors as both having been successfully treated with applications of freeze brands. Other conditions Farrell reported as successfully treated in this way include myxosarcoma, hemangiosarcoma, squamous cell carcinoma, adenoma, melanoma, fibroma, equine sarcoids, atheroma, granuloma, capped hock hygroma, and chronic fistulous tracts. One of the more unusual uses for freeze branding was also described at this meeting: permanently descending skunks and billy goats.

== Overview of technique ==
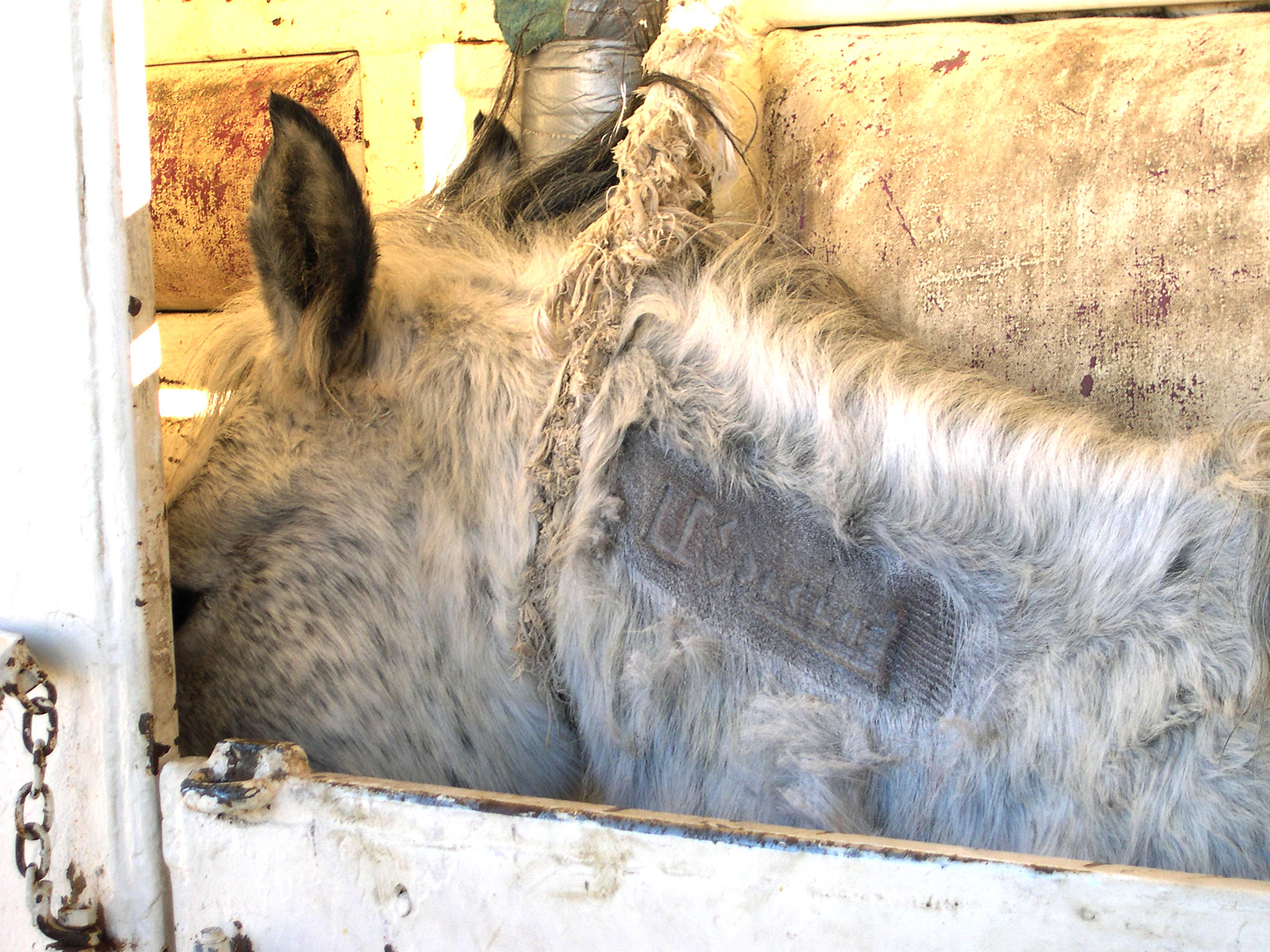
A wild mustang freeze branded by the Bureau of Land Management in 2004. In this photo the brand has just been applied and the horse's skin is still frozen in the depression left by the cryobrand. The brand says the horse is registered to the federal government, was born in 1997 and carries the registration number 599810, indicating that it was branded at a BLM facility in Nevada.

Freeze branding can permanently alter the color of a mammal's coat, leaving the branded area white for the rest of its life. This is ultimately caused by the formation of ice crystals within melanocytes, the cells that normally coat the hair shaft with pigment as the growth root pushes the hair out of the follicle. This ice physically disrupts the microtubules along which melanin granules are transported from within the cell to its membrane, where they normally undergo exocytosis. That cellular machinery is permanently damaged after the cells thaw, preventing the surviving melanocytes from ever again secreting melanin. Most melanocytes rapidly fall into apoptosis and fail to regenerate.

There are two types of freeze branding, one requiring a longer application of the brand than the other. Pigmented animals may be branded more quickly than pale animals because dark coats require only the hair follicles' pigmentation apparatus to be destroyed. This causes the branded skin to regrow hair to which no pigment has been applied as it leaves the hair sheath, rendering the shaft microscopically clear and macroscopically white. Pale animals require a longer branding time to kill the deepest part of the follicle, which secretes the hair shaft itself. This prevents any hair regrowth, leaving a bald patch of skin generally darker than the animal's coat. Freeze branding thereby ensures high contrast even on white-coated animals. The difference in branding time between the two methods is minimal, often separated by only a few seconds.

Freeze branding has benefits over hot-iron branding. These include the absence of scar formation, as cryogenic temperatures do not permanently destroy all layers of an animal's skin. For similar reasons, it is also thought to be less painful than a hot-iron brand. This fact is of more than humanitarian concern: if an animal spasms in pain when the branding iron is applied this can easily dislodge the iron and produce a misbrand, doubling the mark or rendering it illegible. In practice, it is nearly impossible to place an iron in the same place once it has been accidentally moved and this fact coupled with the lower discomfort of freeze branding has contributed to the technique's wide adoption. See also Freeze brand § Controversy, below.

Additionally, a freeze brand on a pigmented animal offers very high contrast year-round and increased legibility from a distance, an important time-saver in range work. Freeze brands are visible no matter the time of year because the coat that grows over them, however wooly or thick it becomes, remains white. Because it is generally the white hair that forms the final brand there is also less blotching and distortion after the animal heals compared with the scarring left by hot branding.

However, freeze branding does have drawbacks. Hot branding typically involves contact between the hot iron and the animal's flesh for less than five seconds. This is termed "dwell time". Freeze branding requires longer periods of contact of up to one minute to create successful brands. Despite requiring a deviation from room temperature of less than half that seen in hot branding, taking the branding iron to its cryogenic working temperature is a far more involved and time-consuming process than that used in hot-iron branding. Specialized irons are required as well as an insulating container in which to chill them. Cryogenic material such as dry ice or liquid nitrogen is also essential. These may be difficult to procure, transport and store in remote areas (although liquid nitrogen is frequently on hand at large ranching operations to preserve banked semen.)

Further, a freeze brand normally reaches its greatest legibility only after several months because white hair must first grow back. Immediately visible freeze brands can be produced by longer branding times, though these also cause the permanent loss of hair. Successful freeze brands must also be preceded by careful shaving of the animal's coat to expose its skin. Finally, there remain fourteen American states do not recognize freeze branding as a legal means of indicating livestock ownership.

== Procedure ==
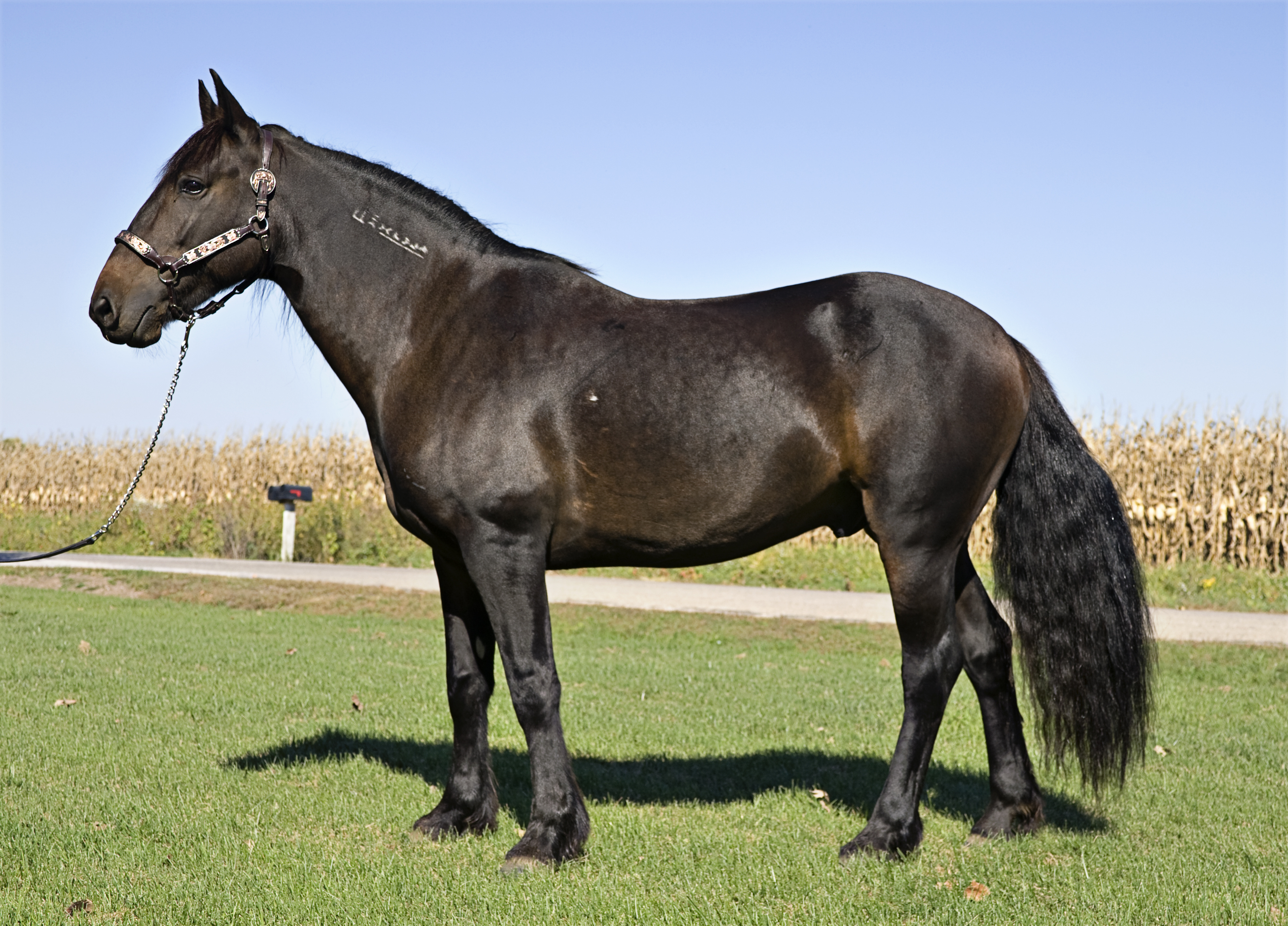
A freeze-branded mustang. The brand says this horse is registered to the Federal Government, was born in the year 2001 and carries the registration number 598563, indicating that the horse was branded at a BLM facility in Nevada.

This section covers livestock Cryo-branding. Since the 1960s, experimental work has been carried out on freeze brands for other animals. Around seventy species have been evaluated to date. These efforts are summarized in Freeze brand § Table of branding durations.

=== Equipment ===
Several pieces of equipment and at least two people are necessary for a successful freeze brand.

==== Branding irons ====
Freeze brands are distinct from hot branding irons, which are generally made from steel or cast iron. Freeze brands at their working temperature possess a smaller difference in temperature from 25 °C than hot brands (−72 °C to −196 °C vs +500 °C). They must therefore be applied for much longer durations—up to 1 minute, compared to 3–5 seconds for hot branding. Further, the rapid removal of heat fundamentally differs from the sudden addition of heat, both in its physiological effects and the time required to achieve a given change in temperature. To compensate for these disadvantages the thermal conductivity of the brand is far more important in freeze branding than it is in hot branding.

Freeze brands are occasionally made from pure copper but are more often made of a cupronickel alloy. This alloy was selected to exploit copper's high thermal conductivity (only diamond and silver are better heat conductors) and nickel's ability to extend copper's high thermal conductivity into cryogenic temperature regimes. Maximum thermal conductivity is desirable because it directly controls how long the supercooled iron must be pressed to the animal's skin. For this reason, steel, brass, bronze and aluminum cryogenic brands are no longer widely used.

Commercial freeze brands generally have a stamp on the stem end indicating what shape of the brand will be produced. This allows the user to select the right brand from the coolant bath without lifting each out to inspect its face.

==== Hair clippers ====
Sharp hair clippers are used to shave the animal and expose its bare skin. Close contact between brand and bare skin is much more important in freeze branding than in hot branding. This is due to hair's excellent heat insulation, which can drastically reduce heat flux during cryogenic branding. An animal not being shaved closely enough is the main cause of failed brands.

==== Coolant ====
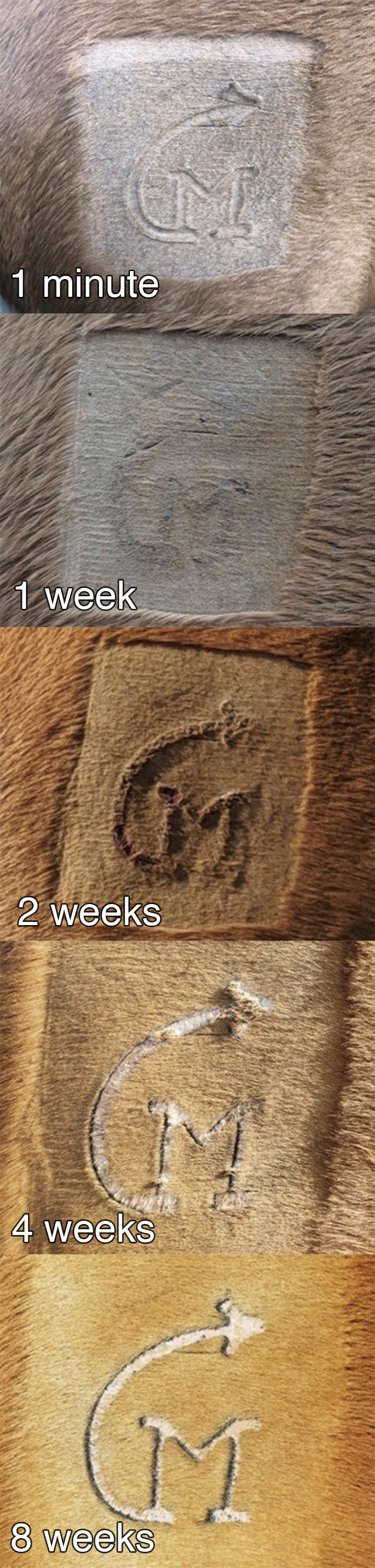
Stages of healing after a pale horse (red dun) is freeze branded. The indentation left in the frozen skin can be seen in the first image while the complete loss of hair in the healed brand area is visible in the last.

A liquid coolant—typically either liquid nitrogen (−196 °C, 77ºK, −320 °F) or 99% ethanol chilled with dry ice (−72 °C, 201ºK, −98 °F)—is used to bring the brand head down to its working temperature in an appropriately insulating container. Other coolants historically used with dry ice have included acetone, isopropanol, methanol, gasoline, kerosene and jet fuel. There is some anecdotal evidence that the lower viscosity of chilled acetone makes for whiter brands, presumably through better heat conduction.

Experimental work has also been carried out using the direct application of coolants to an animal's skin. Freons 12, 21, 22 and 31 have all been evaluated as direct coolants, either as a spray or a slushy mixture of freon ice and liquid. Freons were chosen because they can be bought in pressurized cans that produce cryogenic temperatures when vented. This convenience was desirable aboard a ship or amid pinniped colonies to tag sea mammals for scientific study. Direct freezing with CFCs proved cumbersome and difficult to control, requiring custom masks to form an intentional pattern. The method has largely been abandoned since the Vienna Convention.

Cryogenic alcohol baths readily absorb water from atmospheric humidity, producing slush. This slush is a poor conductor of heat and will ruin brands. If alcohol baths are to be used for a series of brandings the alcohol must be replaced every two hours from a fresh 99% supply. This hygroscopic phenomenon was the original impetus to seek non-water soluble coolants such as kerosene and jet fuel during the technique's development. However, even these hydrocarbons became waterlogged and thick after two days of use. Gasoline does not absorb water from the atmosphere and is sometimes used if ethanol is not available. Ethanol is the most widely used coolant today, as American corn ethanol subsidies have made it less expensive than gasoline in many rural areas.

==== Ethanol drench ====
The alcohol used to clean the area to be branded as well as the alcohol in the coolant bath must have purities of 99%. This is because additives like water or iodine tend to create an alcohol slush at very cold temperatures. This slush is both an ineffective antiseptic and a very poor conductor of heat.

==== Animal restraint ====
Large ranches and farms will generally use a squeeze chute to contain animals during branding. Livestock response to freeze branding is often so muted that ranchers report one leg restraint as being more than enough. Horse freeze branding is often accomplished with no more restraint than a twitch. This is a very different scenario from hot branding, where animals are often tied by all four legs to the bars of their squeeze chute to prevent the flight response from causing a misbrand.

==== Quantities required ====
A rule of thumb for dry ice bath branding states that twenty pounds (9.1 kg) of dry ice and three US gallons (11 L) of 99% alcohol are sufficient to freeze-brand one hundred head of cattle inside a three to four-hour period. An entire day of freeze branding may consume 50–75 pounds (23–34 kilograms) of dry ice and six to nine US gallons (23 to 34 L) of ethanol. The dry ice should be broken up into egg-sized pieces, placed in a styrofoam container or styrofoam-insulated metal cooler and covered with at least three inches (7.6 cm) of alcohol. Many consumer coolers are made from plastics that become exceptionally brittle at cryogenic temperatures. This is a safety concern if heavy metal brands are frequently returned to coolant baths because 99% alcohol is extremely flammable. Insulated aluminum containers are preferred.

=== Freeze branding process ===
==== Site selection ====
To prepare for branding a site on the animal's hide must be selected. Careful selection is important for two reasons: first, certain states and counties have various laws regarding legal brand placement and second, the arrangement of muscles beneath the skin determines whether the death of pigment cells occurs evenly. If a brand is attempted in an area that is partly muscle and partly bone the harder bone will take most of the brand while the flexible muscle tissue is less efficiently cooled and so more lightly branded. Modern branding operations are often recorded on video to facilitate the production of records at a later date.

==== Brand chilling ====
The cupronickel branding irons must be entirely submerged in coolant for 20–30 minutes. It is necessary to completely submerge the entire brand head in coolant to ensure an even cryogenic temperature during the actual branding. This is required because the high thermal conductivity of cupronickel alloys ensures a warmer portion will rapidly heat cooler areas, leading to an uneven brand. Brand irons are ready to use when the coolant bath is no longer boiling, indicating that the brand has reached equilibrium temperature with its cryogenic surroundings.

==== Site shaving ====
Before branding, the site of the brand must be shaved very closely to the skin. The site should also be shaved with at least the bottom edge as square as possible. This assists the worker when placing the brand and helps prevent it from dislodging on animals with thick coats.

The excellent insulating properties of hair make a close shave critically important for achieving an even brand. Shaving permits a close interface between brand and flesh. Specialized clipper blades and heads have been designed for cryogenic branding and are made to provide as close a shave as possible. Once shaved, the area to be branded is soaked with alcohol to disinfect the animal's skin.

==== Alcohol douse ====
Whether or not an alcohol bath is used to cool the irons, the area must be soaked with alcohol again just before branding. This second alcohol soak provides some evaporative cooling of the animal's skin but much more importantly creates an interface between flesh and brand head, greatly enhancing heat transfer while also reducing the amount of time a brand must be pressed into the animal's skin. Pre-wetting the animal's skin with alcohol also prevents the iron from sticking to the frozen skin when liquid nitrogen is used, as frozen alcohol is mechanically very weak compared to the varieties of water ice encountered at cryogenic temperatures.

==== Removing excess coolant ====
After the area to be branded is cleaned and soaked with alcohol, the brand is removed from its coolant. It is very important to shake the brand vigorously to remove as much coolant as possible from its working surface. This is necessary because drips of coolant are capable of freezing an animal's skin on their own as they roll down its body, producing a permanent drip mark down the hide of the animal. It is also necessary because the dynamic viscosity of ethanol greatly increases at cryogenic temperatures, rising more than eight-fold from room temperatures. The thicker alcohol necessitates a more thorough shaking than one would give the same brand covered in water.

==== Branding ====
Once shaken free of coolant the brand is pressed to the animal's bare skin with a slight rocking motion for between six and sixty seconds, with between 35 and 45 pounds of force (16–20 kg; 170–200 N). Time is most often kept by an assistant with a stopwatch as the difference between a brand that grows back with white hair and one that remains bald forever can be less than five seconds.

==== Re-chilling brands ====
The iron is then returned to the coolant bath. Once used, a branding iron in its coolant takes between two and ten minutes to reach its working temperature again. For this reason, several irons are usually cooled at the same time to permit rapid branding of more than one animal or the convenient duplication of alphanumeric characters such as "AA" or "33". So long as dry ice remains in an alcohol bath, irons submerged in it will eventually reach working temperatures.

==== Clipper alcohol douse ====
If more than one animal is being branded the clippers must also be washed with alcohol between shaving each animal. This prevents hair particles from building up in the blades of the clippers, whose residue on the animal's skin can cause uneven or failed branding.

==== Healing schedule ====
Immediately after branding the chilled tissue is indented with the desired pattern. This lasts for 3–5 minutes until thawing begins. After this, blood circulation returns to the thawed tissue. The animal's body detects the injury and the area begins to exhibit redness followed shortly by swelling. This edema subsides after about five days, often giving way to a scab. At this point, some apply a salve, such as Corona multipurpose ointment. After a month the top layer of skin will slough off along with any hair that has grown during this time.

This schedule is an approximation, as actual healing rates vary depending on when in an animal's annual hair-growth cycle the brand is applied. Complete healing and final brand appearance can take up to five months in animals branded during a winter phase of hair growth and in as little as one or two months on animals with spring coats.

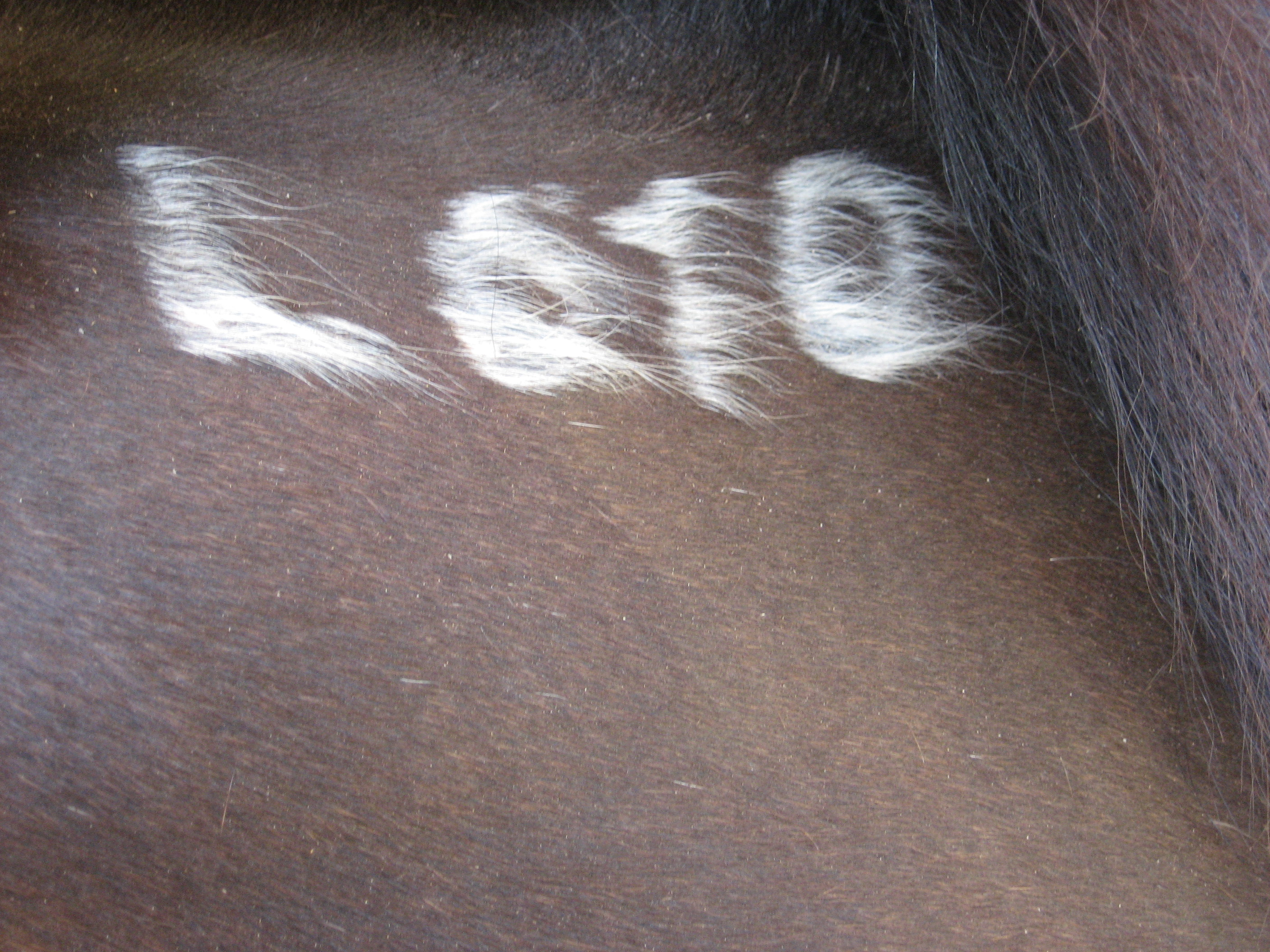
Bardigiano pony with a freeze brand on its neck. The long white hairs display the accelerated growth triggered by the destruction of follicle melanocytes.

==== Finished brand ====
One of the reasons freeze branding produces such a crisp mark in healed animals is that at the edge of the zone of melanocyte death, there remains a border of melanocytes that have merely been stressed. These stressed melanocytes thereafter express more melanin. This provides a subtle outline to the pattern of white hair, increasing the definition of its edge and legibility, if alphanumeric. At three months the process is generally complete for livestock and the full freeze brand is visible.

===== Accelerated hair re-growth =====
Hair returns to the brand site with the next hair cycle in darker animals, but the loss after a month is permanent for pale-coated animals. Around two months after branding white hair will begin to grow on darker animals. This white hair often grows much more quickly than the rest of the coat and may eventually grow long enough to overlap the surrounding, pigmented hair. This boost occurs because growth follicles no longer compete for energy with the dormant or dead melanocytes. Under normal conditions, this competition is one of the key checks on the speed of hair growth.

== Branding times ==
The length of time the brand is applied depends on several factors, such as the thermal conductivity of the metal used, the age of the animal, the thickness of its skin, the color or pigment to its coat, and the amount of hair, if any, that remains between brand and skin after shaving.

Although the animal is shaved, the time of brand application also depends on the stage of the animal's hair growth, with rapidly growing spring coats requiring less time and those with winter coats requiring more. It is hypothesized that the pigment-producing melanocytes are more easily destroyed during periods of rapid hair, and hence rapid pigmentation, production. It is important to adhere to brand time guidelines because melanocytes that are merely stressed rather than killed often react by producing even more melanin than they did before their injury. This is the same reaction responsible for skin tanning and the darkening of skin under regular mechanical strain. These failed brands then regrow as dark skin producing even darker hair than was present before, creating a very low-contrast marking.

=== Table of branding durations ===
Typical branding times with appropriately sized irons are as follows, with darker animals usually developing successful brands after the minimum application time. This table also summarizes experimental work carried out to assess freeze branding as a means of marking animals for scientific study.

Animal	Species assessed	Age	Area branded	Coolant	Head material	Branding time	Result	Time until visible	Brand retention	References
Horse	1	2+ years	various	Liquid nitrogen	Cupronickel	10–15 sec	✅	1–5 months	Until animal's death	
Horse		2+ years	various	Dry ice and ethanol	Cupronickel	20–24 sec	✅	1–5 months	Until animal's death	
Horse		< 1 year	various	Liquid nitrogen	Cupronickel	7–15 sec	✅	1–3 months	Until animal's death	
Horse		< 1 year	various	Dry ice and ethanol	Cupronickel	16–24 sec	✅	1–3 months	Until animal's death	
Przewalski's horse	1	Adult	Caudal thigh	Liquid nitrogen	Aluminum	1 minute	✅	3–4 weeks	Until animal's death	
Cow	1	2+ years	various	Liquid nitrogen	Cupronickel	25–30 sec	✅	2–3 months	Until animal's death	
Cow		2+ years	various	Dry ice and ethanol	Cupronickel	50–60 sec	✅	2–3 months	Until animal's death	
Cow		< 1 year	various	Liquid nitrogen	Cupronickel	21–24 sec	✅	1–3 months	Until animal's death	
Cow		< 1 year	various	Dry ice and ethanol	Cupronickel	40–50 sec	✅	1–3 months	Until animal's death	
Sheep	1	Adult	various	Dry ice and ethanol	Cupronickel	30–40 sec	✅	6 weeks	Until animal's death	
Sheep		3 months	Breech	Liquid nitrogen	Cupronickel jaws	3–5 seconds	✅^{a}	hairless at 6 weeks	Until animal's death	
Human	1	33 years	Inner forearm	Dry ice and isopropanol	Mild steel	10 sec	❌^{b}	n/a	more than 6 months	
Monkey	1	Adult	Shoulder	Liquid nitrogen	Copper	12–15 sec	✅			
Ring-tailed lemur	1	Adult	Bicep	Freon-12 slush	Direct application	3–6 sec	✅	8 weeks	more than 20 months	
Brown lemur	1	Adult	Forearm	Freon-12 slush	Direct application	3–6 sec	✅	8 weeks	more than 20 months	
Parma wallaby	1	Adult	Haunch	Freon-12 slush	Direct application	3–10 sec	❌	n/a	n/a	
Beaver	1	4 mo–7 yrs	Tail	Liquid nitrogen	Cast iron	15 sec–2 min	✅	19 days–8 weeks	Unspecified	
Squirrel	1	Adult	Back	Dry ice and acetone	Copper	25–40 sec	✅	3–5 weeks	Until animal's death	
Rat	1	Adult	Back	Dry ice and isopropanol	Copper	20–35 sec	✅	3–5 weeks	Until animal's death	
House mouse	1	Adult	Back	Dry ice and methanol	Copper	20–35 sec	✅	3–5 weeks	Until animal's death	
House mouse		1–3 days	Back	Dry ice and methanol	Copper	4–7 sec	✅	3 weeks	Until animal's death	
House mouse		3–6 days	Back	Dry ice and methanol	Copper	7–10 sec	✅	3 weeks	Until animal's death	
House mouse		9 days	Back	Dry ice and methanol	Copper	10–15 sec	✅	3 weeks	Until animal's death	
Cat	1	Adult	Back and belly	Dry ice and ethanol	Copper pipe	5–10 sec	✅		Until animal's death	
Dog	1	Adult	Both ears	Dry ice and isopropanol	Bronze	35–45 sec	✅		Until animal's death	
Fox	1									
Elk	1	Adult		Liquid nitrogen	Cupronickel	> 30 sec	✅			
Deer	1	Adult		Liquid nitrogen	Cupronickel	20 sec	✅			
Elephant	1	2 years	Both ears	Dry ice and ethanol	Copper	2x 2 minutes	✅	1–2 weeks	more than 7 months	
Goat	1									
Dwarf mongoose	1	Adult		Dry ice and ethanol	Copper	3–5 sec	✅	3–6 weeks		
Hamster	1									
Black-tailed prairie dog	1		Back	Dry ice and ethanol	Copper	20–35 sec	✅		Until animal's death	
Bat	1, 2, 3, 4	Adult	Back	Dry ice and ethanol	Copper washer	3.5–5 sec	✅	3–6 weeks	Until animal's death	
Sea lion	1	Adult	Flank	Liquid nitrogen	Copper	~30 sec	✅			
Sea lion		Adult	Flipper	Liquid nitrogen	Copper	~30 sec	✅			
Walrus	1						✅			
Dolphins	1, 2, 3, 4, 5, 6, 7						✅			
Dolphins		Adult	Dorsal fin				✅		more than 38 years	
Dolphins		Adult	Dorsal fin	Dry ice only	Copper	~9 sec	✅	immediate		
Dolphins		Adult	Dorsal fin	Dry ice and ethanol			✅		more than 4.8 years	
Dolphins		Adult	Dorsal fin	Liquid nitrogen			✅^{c}		more than 4.8 years	
Dolphins		Adult	Dorsal fin	Freon 12	Direct application	15–90 sec	❌	n/a	n/a	
Seal	1	2 months	Flank	Liquid nitrogen	Steel	5 sec	✅			
Seal		14 months	Flank	Liquid nitrogen	Steel	7 sec	✅			
Porpoise	1	Adult	Dorsal fin	Liquid nitrogen	Bronze	10 sec	✅	immediate		
Whales	1, 2, 3						✅			
Elephant seal	1	> 4–6 weeks	Flank	Liquid nitrogen	Brass	10 sec	❌^{d}	n/a	less than 1 year	
Elephant seal		> 4–6 weeks	Flank	Dry ice	Brass	10 sec	❌^{d}	n/a	less than 1 year	
Elephant seal		> 4–6 weeks	Flank	Liquid nitrogen	Brass	30 sec	❌^{d}	n/a	less than 1 year	
Elephant seal		> 4–6 weeks	Flank	Dry ice	Brass	30 sec	❌^{d}	n/a	less than 1 year	
Manatee	1	Adult	Scapula	Liquid nitrogen	Copper	5–17 sec	❌	animal released	less than 7 years	
Manatee		Adult	Flank		Cast iron	30 sec	❌	5 days	less than 1 year	
Chicken	1	Adult		Dry ice and acetone	Copper	5 sec	❌	n/a		
Mallard duck	1	5–10 days	Various	Dry ice and ethanol	Brass	2–12 sec	❌^{e}	n/a	less than 1 year	
Mallard duck		5–10 days	Various	Freon 21 bath	Brass	16 sec	❌^{e}	n/a	less than 1 year	
Mallard duck		5–10 days	Various	Freon 31 bath	Brass	2–24 sec	❌^{e}	n/a	less than 1 year	
Mallard duck		5–10 days	Various	Freon 21	Direct application	2–24 sec	❌^{e}	n/a	less than 1 year	
Mallard duck		5–10 days	Various	Freon 31	Direct application	2–24 sec	❌^{e}	n/a	less than 1 year	
Frog	1	Adult	Belly	Dry ice and ethanol	Copper wire	~10 sec	✅	24 hours	more than 2 years	
Toad	1	Adult					❌^{f}			
Rough-skinned newt	1	Adult	Belly	Liquid nitrogen	Copper wire	10 sec	✅			
Salamanders	1, 2, 3	Adult	various	Dry ice and ethanol	Copper round stock	0.5–3 sec	❌^{g}	n/a	n/a	
Caecilian	1	Adult		Liquid nitrogen	16 AWG Copper wire	1.5 sec	✅			
Pine snake	1	Adult	Midbody	Dry ice and ethanol	Copper bar	20–30 sec	✅	2–3 weeks	more than 5 sheddings	
Pine snake		Adult	Midbody	Freon 12 bath	Synthetic sponge	5–22 sec	✅	2–3 weeks	more than 5 sheddings	
Pine snake		Adult	Midbody	Freon 22 bath	Synthetic sponge	5–22 sec	✅	2–3 weeks	more than 5 sheddings	
Prairie rattlesnake	1	Adult	Midbody	Freon 12 bath	Synthetic sponge	5–22 sec	✅	2–3 weeks	more than 5 sheddings	
Prairie rattlesnake		Adult	Midbody	Freon 12 spray	Direct application	1.5 sec	✅		more than 5 sheddings	
Alligator	1	Adult					✅			
Green turtle	1	Adult					✅			
Brachyrhaphis	3	Adult	Anal fin	Dry ice	Direct application	30 sec total	✅			
Minnow		Adult								
Channel catfish	1	Adult	Lateral				✅		more than 3 years	
Striped bass	1	Adult	Lateral	Dry ice	Direct application	< 2 sec	✅	immediate		
Smallmouth bass	1	Adult	Various	Liquid nitrogen	Sterling silver	1.5–2 sec	✅			
Rock bass	1	Adult	Various	Liquid nitrogen	Sterling silver	1.5–2 sec	✅			
Rainbow trout	1	Adult	Lateral	Liquid nitrogen	Copper	4 sec	✅	immediate		
Rainbow trout		Immature	Lateral	Liquid nitrogen	Stainless steel	2 sec	✅	immediate		
Rainbow trout		Fry	Lateral	Liquid nitrogen	Copper	4 sec	✅	immediate		
Rainbow trout		Adult	Various	Liquid nitrogen	Sterling silver	1.5–2 sec	✅			
Rainbow trout		1–2 years		Dry ice and ethanol	Silver head/copper rod	2 sec	❌		less than 6 months	
Brown trout	1	Adult	Various	Liquid nitrogen	Silver	1.5–2 sec	✅			
Brook trout	1	Adult	Various	Liquid nitrogen	Silver	1.5–2 sec	✅			
Steelhead trout	1	Juvenile		Liquid nitrogen	Brass	1 sec	✅			
Redbreast sunfish	1	Adult	Various	Liquid nitrogen	Sterling silver	1.5–2 sec	✅			
Pinfish	1	Adult	Dorsal	Liquid CO_{2}	Sterling silver	5 sec	✅		duration of study	
Northern squawfish	1	Adult		Dry ice and ethanol	Silver head/copper rod	2 sec	✅		less than 12 weeks	
Carp	1	Adult		Dry ice and ethanol	Silver head/copper rod	2 sec	✅		less than 12 weeks	
Mountain whitefish	1	Adult		Dry ice and ethanol	Silver head/copper rod	2 sec	✅		more than 4 months	
Muskellunge	1						✅			
American eel	1	Adult	Lateral	Liquid nitrogen	Cast iron	5 sec	✅		at least 1 year	
Largescale sucker	1	Adult		Dry ice and ethanol	Silver head/copper rod	2 sec	✅		less than 12 weeks	
Roach	1	Adult	Lateral	Liquid nitrogen	Copper	4 sec	✅	2–3 days		
Walleye	1	Fingerling	Lateral	Liquid nitrogen	Brass	0.75–2 sec	✅	< 4 days	more than 3 years	
Black crappie	1	Juvenile		Liquid nitrogen	Brass	2 sec	✅		more than 8 months	
Atlantic salmon	1	Smolt		Liquid nitrogen	Silver head/copper rod	1.5–2 sec	❌		less than 1 year	
Chinook salmon	1	Juvenile		Liquid nitrogen	Brass	1 sec	✅			
Coho salmon	1	Adult	Lateral	Liquid nitrogen	Copper	5 sec	✅	3–4 days		
Coho salmon		Juvenile		Liquid nitrogen	Brass	1 sec	✅		more than 2 months	
Coho salmon		Juvenile		Liquid CO_{2}	Sterling silver	~4 sec.	✅		more than 6 weeks	
Sockeye salmon	1	Juvenile		Liquid nitrogen	Brass	1 sec	✅		more than 14 months	
Sockeye salmon		Fry		Liquid nitrogen	Brass	1 sec	❌		less than 3 weeks	
Flounder	1	Adult		Liquid nitrogen	Copper	3 sec	✅		more than 18 months	
Plaice	1	Adult		Liquid nitrogen	Copper	3 sec	✅		more than 18 months	
Coconut crab	1	Adult		Freon 12	High density foam	5–10 sec	✅	next molt	more than 9 months	
Dungeness crab	1	Adult	Cephalothorax	Dry ice and ethanol	Copper	5 sec	✅	next molt	more than 3 molts	
Crayfish	1	Adult		Dry ice and ethanol	Copper	5 sec	✅	next molt	more than 2 months	

==== Notes ====
^{a} See Freeze brand § Freeze branding as a painless alternative to mulesing.

^{b} See the subsection on human cryobranding in Freeze brand § Usage.

^{c} Irwin reports that keeping the iron stationary when branding a dolphin's dorsal fin, rather than rocking it as with livestock, produced a markedly clearer result.

^{d} Although adequate marks appeared on the elephant seal's skin at the time of cryobranding none of the marks produced lasted more than 1 year.

^{e} Down feathers grew white after cryobranding but did not persist in adult Mallards nor affect the outer contour feathers when they grew in. According to Greenwood, citing Foulks: "melanocytes continually arise from undifferentiated melanoblasts in the dermis during feather growth. Apparently the presence of whitetipped down resulted from the destruction of melanocytes associated with the tip of the developing feather, which were later replaced with active melanocytes before the deposition process terminated. Although birds were treated at ages of 5–10 days, and at various early stages of feather development, no apparent effect on pigmentation of contour feathers occurred."

^{f} Herpetologist Charles F. Smith described freeze branding as "[in]effective for bufonids [toads] and other taxa with granular skin surfaces."

^{g} All salamanders tested were seriously injured, and some later died. The author does not recommend his method be copied.

== Controversy ==
=== Animal pain ===
The intense sociality of humans and the readiness with which they perceive, and identify with, manifestations of physical pain in others have made the study of pain notoriously difficult to quantify. Indeed, many investigators of animal pain shy away from the use of the word "pain" in published research. They consider the term to be unscientific and grounded in human emotion, preferring others such as "stress" or "avoidance". As the subjective experience of animals is very resistant to rational assessment, the subjective difference between their painless reflex responses to noxious stimuli (nociception) and pain as humans understand it has been nearly impossible to determine conclusively.

For this reason, essentially all scientific research into the nature of animal pain has depended upon so-called pain proxies. These include obvious behavioral changes—shying away, stamping, vocalization, ear cues etc.—as well as subtler changes, as when injured chickens or rats choose a feed that has been laced with an analgesic over feed that has not. Most prized by scientists are the quantifiable physiological changes such as elevated heart rate, wound temperature or stress hormone serum concentrations. These physiological proxies are valued because their assessments are carried out by machines and do not rely on humans to determine the magnitude of the variable under study. This is seldom the case for behavioral pain proxies, which are most often scored by a researcher on some numerical scale ranging from "no response" to "intense response".

=== Scientific attempts to quantify the pain of freeze branding ===
Even though current scientific methodologies cannot adequately distinguish between reflex response and the lay understanding of pain, scientific methods are well suited to comparing two stimuli and making a reasonable assertion as to which is objectively less noxious. Freeze branding has frequently been hailed as a less noxious means of permanently denoting ownership of livestock. Despite this, the claim that freeze branding is inherently less painful than hot branding has been challenged. These challenges provoked scientific studies to determine the matter objectively and they have attempted to measure the pain experienced by animals during and after their branding.

==== In calves ====
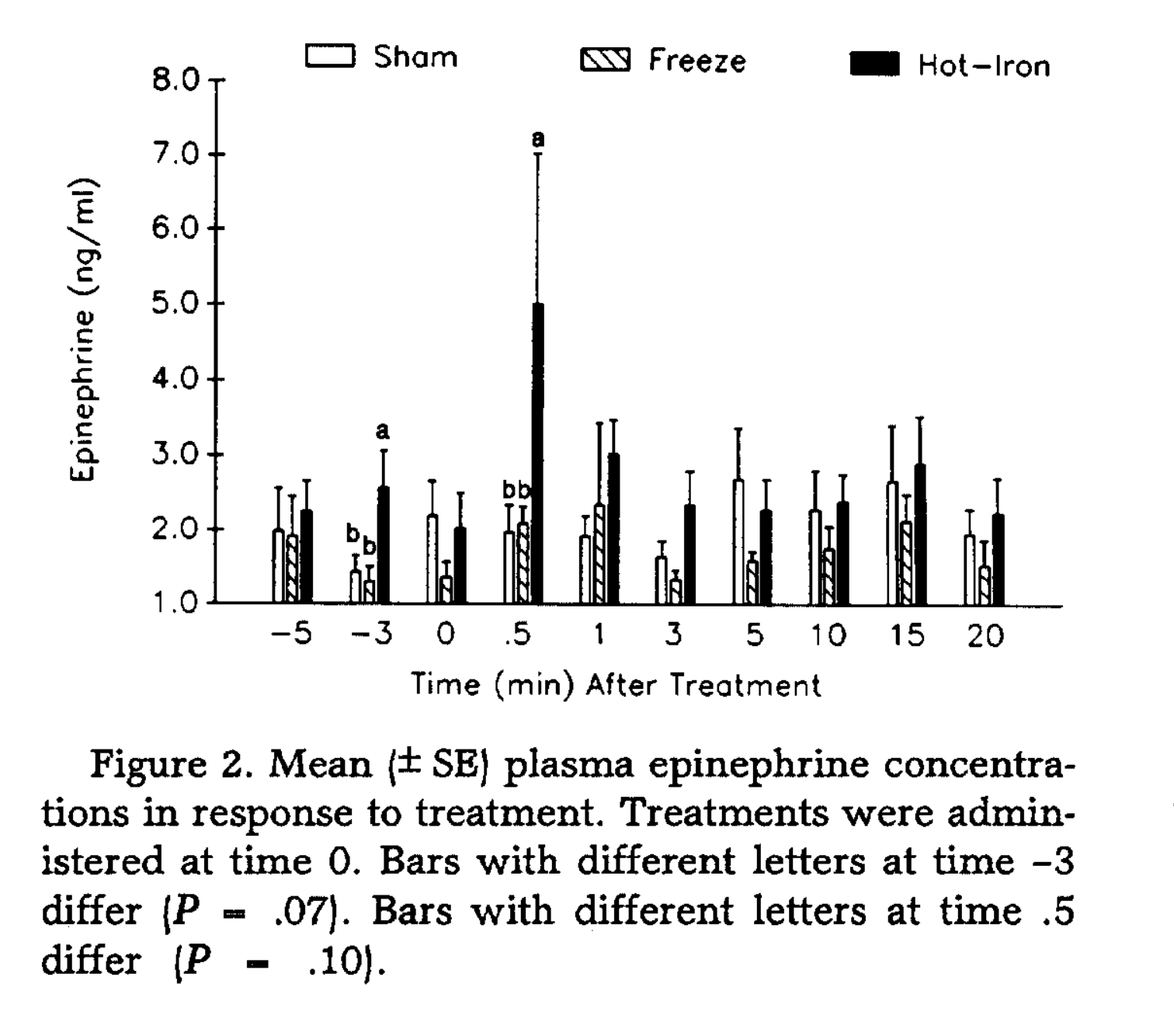
Mean plasma epinephrine concentrations in calves subjected to freeze, hot, or sham branding. All brands were administered at time zero.

In one study involving young cattle measurable proxies for pain were identified. Such proxies included heart rate and the plasma concentrations of the stress hormones cortisol, epinephrine, norepinephrine and catecholamine. Heart rate was monitored with standard veterinary ECG equipment and hormone concentrations determined through repeated blood sampling. An increase in any of these stress hormones or vocalization by the animal was assumed to register an increase in pain. A small microphone taped to the calves' throat was used to capture their vocalization response.

Twenty-seven calves were divided into three groups. Each group received either a hot-iron brand, a freeze brand using liquid nitrogen, or a "sham" brand. The sham brand was an iron kept at room temperature and pressed to the calves' skin for the same duration as a hot brand. The sham branding created a control group used to determine baseline levels of vocalization and normal hormone concentrations. A cannula was inserted into the jugular vein of each calf to sample their blood during branding. These cannula were inserted into each calf 14 to 20 hours before the experiment using squeeze chutes in a different building from the one in which they would be branded.

To minimize systematic bias, researchers used blocking to separate the calves by temperament, weight, and sex. Random assignment was then used to determine the order in and the day on which a given animal was branded. While being branded, ten blood samples were collected, heart rate measurements were taken, and vocalizations recorded with the microphone. These samplings occurred at uneven intervals during a 25-minute period, from five minutes before to twenty minutes after branding.

This study determined that mean concentrations of plasma epinephrine were higher for hot branded calves than for both freeze branded calves and sham branded calves. Epinephrine levels peaked at 30 seconds for hot branded calves and at 1 minute for freeze branded calves. Heart rates, hormone concentrations, and epinephrine levels, the study's primary pain proxy, were all elevated in hot-branded calves. In terms of vocalization, one hot-branded and two freeze-branded calves expressed distress during branding, although this may have been due to the absence of other cattle in the calf's field of view. Calves branded in the presence of other calves were more likely to vocalize, as would be expected from herd animals.

Another study also using calves monitored their escape-avoidance reaction. The vertical movement of a calf during branding was used as an operational definition to measure avoidance of the brand. The experimenters concluded that hot-branded calves tried harder to escape their branding irons than either the freeze-branded or sham-branded calves.

These two experiments determined that the hot-iron-branded calves experienced higher plasma epinephrine concentrations, heart rates, plasma cortisol concentrations, and escape-avoidance reactions and therefore experienced more pain than the freeze-branded and sham-branded calves.

==== In foals ====
Investigators from Brazil used foals in an attempt to quantify the pain of freeze branding compared to hot branding. Two groups of foals were fitted with heart monitors and randomly assigned either freeze branding or hot branding. Blood samples were taken 30 minutes before branding and then again, 30 and 60 minutes after branding. Hot brands were applied for 3 seconds or less and liquid nitrogen-chilled freeze brands were applied for 60 seconds (sic). The foals were video-recorded during their branding for later ethological analysis by two veterinarians. These experts in horse body language scrutinized the recordings and assigned scores based on how many indications of pain each foal exhibited during branding. The score ranged from 0 to 6 and attempted to quantify the distress, if any, shown by the foals. Cortisol levels were determined from the three blood samples and heart rates were recorded until 60 minutes after branding. No sham-branded control group was used.

Their analysis of collected data indicated that "both hot and freeze iron branding induced stress responses in foals, with a similar increase in the cortisol levels and intense pain and escape behavioral response" but that freeze branding resulted in less autonomic (fight-or-flight) response, suggesting that hot branding was the more stressful of the two procedures. This, combined with the lesser severity of wounds created by the freeze brands led the experimenters to conclude that freeze branding was the better choice. The results led the authors to recommend the prohibition of hot branding.

==== In cattle ====
Canadian researchers used yearling heifers to determine the relative pain of the two branding methods. Thirty animals were randomly assigned either a hot, freeze or sham branding. Blood samples were drawn every 20 minutes, beginning 20 minutes before branding and for 3 hours after. Each heifer in the hot group was branded with three separate steel irons for a total of 9–15 seconds (3–5 seconds per iron), while heifers in the freeze group were branded with three separate copper irons (of the same design as the hot group) for a total of 60 seconds (20 seconds per iron). Cattle in the sham group were placed in the same squeeze chute used for the real brandings. The animals were shaved in this restraint and then held there for 3 minutes, the mean duration of the actual brandings.

The results showed that both hot and freeze-branded cattle had elevated cortisol levels compared with the sham-branded group. Hot and freeze-branded animals had similar maximum elevations, which occurred 20 minutes after branding. Cortisol levels in the hot-branded group took longer to return to baseline than either the freeze or sham-branded heifers. No significant difference in cortisol concentration was noted between the two branded groups after 40 minutes post-branding. No significant differences between the three groups were detected with the other proxies the experimenters selected for pain (touch sensitivity and stress-induced analgesia). The authors concluded that,

[b]oth hot-iron and freeze branding cause acute pain in the first 1.5 h after branding as shown by the marked increase in cortisol. The more pronounced and prolonged elevation of cortisol observed in H animals implies that hot-iron branding may be initially (up to 40 min after branding) more distressing than freeze branding. However, there appeared to be no differences after the 40 min sampling time suggesting that the discomfort caused by both methods is relatively short lived.

==== With thermal imaging ====
Drawing on successful medical research that used thermal imaging to appraise the severity of burns, in 1997 a different group of Canadian researchers used similar technology on recently branded cattle. This was done to determine whether the wounds created by hot and freeze branding remained equally swollen and presumably painful, or if there was a difference in healing between the two methods. Thirty heifers were randomly selected for either hot or freeze branding. Two 25 cm^{2} patches were shaved on each heifer and the higher of the two was selected for branding, with the other serving as a control. Fifteen of the heifers were hot branded for 3–4 seconds and the others Cryo-branded with copper irons for 22 seconds. A thermographic camera able to measure skin temperatures to ± 0.1 °C was then used to observe the wound and the control at intervals. This gave a proxy for tissue inflammation and, it was thought, the animal's level of discomfort. The temperature of the control site was then subtracted from the temperature of the branding site to give the difference between the two techniques.

The data indicated that both methods caused tissue damage, with the freeze brands being warmer and more inflamed than the hot brands at two and eight hours. However, this trend soon reversed and the inflammatory responses triggered by the brandings appeared to diverge rapidly. Hot brand wounds were still significantly warmer than controls one week later, by which time the freeze-branded areas were no warmer than their controls. This led the researchers to conclude that although there was little evidence for one technique being less painful than the other at the time of application, freeze branding did produce much less inflammation in the heifers' skin one week out from their brandings.

In 1998 the same researchers followed up with a similar study comparing the effectiveness of thermal imagery to behavioral cues like tail flicking and vocalizing as a proxy for pain in steers. Unsurprisingly they found that thermography was far more reliable and its results more statistically significant than human-mediated behavioral study.

=== Freeze branding as a painless alternative to mulesing ===
The Australian sheep blowfly (in fact an invasive species from South Africa) afflicts many sheep in Australia. In the late 19th century Merino sheep in Australia were crossbred with loose-skinned Merino sheep from Vermont. This resulted in such a productive fleece that it formed wrinkles on the animal. The popularity of Merino wool in the 20th century led Australian sheep breeders to continue selecting for the thickest possible fleeces on their sheep. However, this lucrative trait often meant that the thick wool and wrinkled skin on the sheep's rear readily attracted and held dirt and feces. This collection of unsanitary material as well as the ulcers it sometimes causes at the bottom of skin wrinkles are very attractive to gravid female blow flies, who seek out sheep with wounds and soiled fleeces to lay their eggs. Once the maggots hatch they gravitate to open wounds if any are present. This is flystrike, a type of myiasis. The disorder, also called breechstrike, often leads to systemic secondary infections and death.

In the early-1930s an Australian rancher named John Mules was shearing an ewe when he accidentally cut off a small patch of skin near the ewe's breech (anus). The ewe had suffered from flystrike before and Mules carefully attended to her healing in case she developed another infestation in the wound he had accidentally caused. To Mules' surprise once the wound healed it replaced tangled and dirty breech wool with smooth scar tissue. Blowflies were no longer attracted to this area on the ewe as it could collect little dirt or feces. No relapse of flystrike occurred. Mules and others soon developed this serendipitous discovery into a technique now known as mulesing.

During this operation, small strips of epidermis are peeled from a sheep's buttock using steel shears on either side of the anus and underside of the tail. This was formerly performed on mature sheep but it was later found that lambs recover more quickly and completely than older animals. Mulesing reduces the likelihood of flystrike by about 13 times. The practice became nearly universal during the 20th century. The success of animal rights movements in agitating for the procedure's curtailment has brought the proportion of Australian sheep ranchers who practice mulesing down to around 70% today.

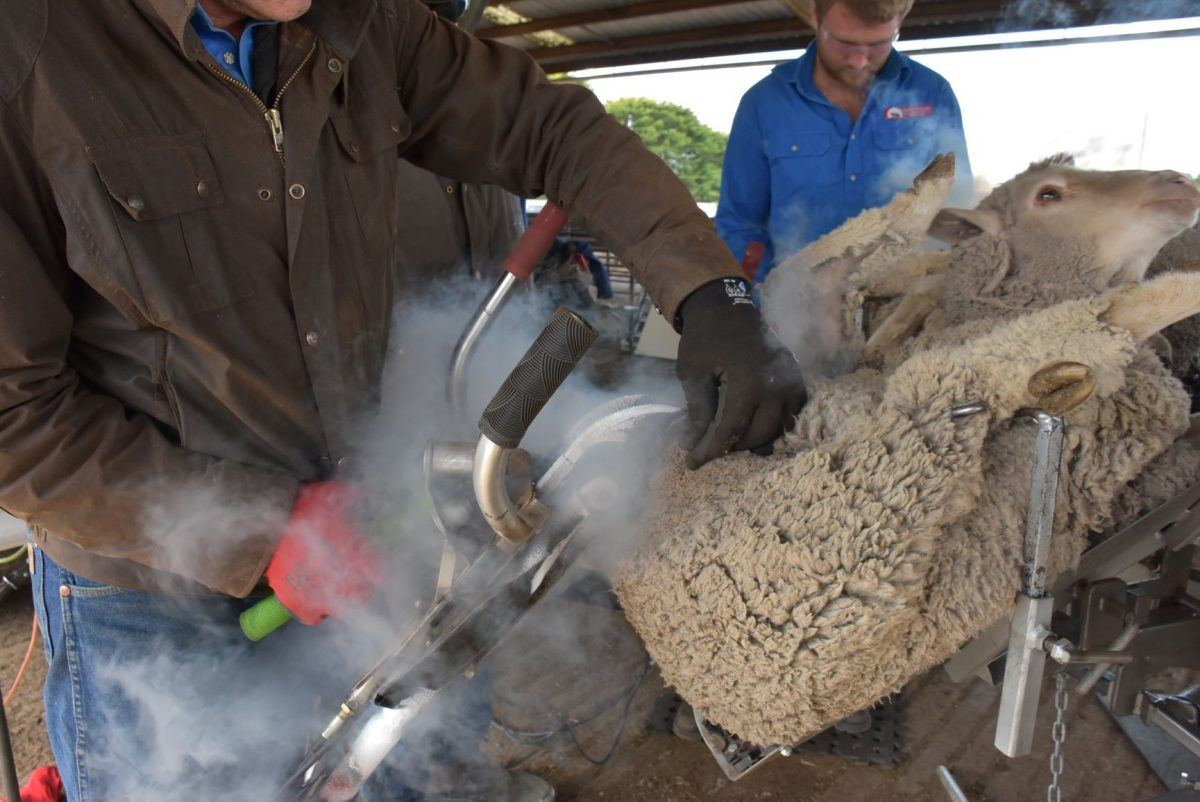
Lamb undergoing steining in Dubbo, NSW.

Successful international boycotts of Australian Merino wool in the early 2000s set those invested in Australian sheep rearing on the hunt for alternatives. The publicity generated intense interest in finding a replacement for mulesing that domestic and international consumers would accept. An adaptation of the freeze branding process was hit upon in the 2010s. The new technique was quickly christened steining after its designer, John Steinfort, an Australian veterinary scientist. In 2019 Australian Wool Network (AWN), a private corporation servicing the Australian wool industry, provided Steinfort funding to commercialize the technique.

During steining hollow cupronickel clamping jaws about 4 inches (10 cm) long are used to pinch up rolls of skin beneath the tail and near the anus of a lamb. No shaving is required in this application of freeze branding. Once sufficient skin is in the clamps liquid nitrogen is pumped through the jaws and onto the pinched skin. This rapidly freezes the lamb's skin as it drips out of the jaws and through the animal's fleece. The goal is to achieve a level of cellular injury that prevents future hair growth but not so much that a 3rd-degree cold burn is created. Pinching the skin is thought to mitigate the degree of cold burn by removing it somewhat from the muscles and connective tissue beneath. The treated skin goes through the same stages of healing seen in the long method of freeze-branding larger livestock, concluding with permanent hairlessness. Studies show this method is at least as good at preventing flystrike as mulesing and carries few long-term consequences for the lamb's later growth.

Steinfort and others invested in the process have claimed it is less painful and distressing than mulesing to the animals on which it is practiced. They argue that affected nerve endings are immediately numbed and that sensation does not return during healing when a scab forms and is eventually sloughed in 6 to 8 weeks. A 2018 study found behavioral markers indicating pain and distress in lambs who had been steined without analgesic treatment compared to those who had been given analgesics. In 2020 a University of Melbourne researcher named Ellen Jongman was commissioned to study the issue by the company Steinfort formed to commercialize his technique, SteinfortAgVet. On December 22, 2020, she released preliminary results from her study on the relative pain of mulesing and steining.

Jongman found that mulesing and steining were equally painful on the day of the procedure but that steined lambs appeared to be in less pain than mulesed lambs on subsequent days. Her study tracked and interpreted a series of lamb behaviors like the speed at which it returned to its mother after undergoing either mulesing or steining. She called for further research using physiological data such as heart rate and blood sampling in addition to behavioral observations. Jongman's final report was released on January 25, 2021. In March 2021 AWN cut ties with Steinfort and divested from this application of freeze branding.

As of July 22, 2021, the position of the RSPCA is that Australian Merino sheep have not been ethically bred, as seen in their susceptibility to flystrike. They believe "any painful procedure to change the breech area should only be considered an interim, short-term solution that accompanies a breeding program that focusses on flystrike resistance and is carried out only where necessary to manage at-risk sheep".

== Usage ==
=== Horses ===
Horses are branded with both the hot-iron and cryogenic techniques. Their brands most often denote ownership. Owners will generally create a unique brand to identify the horses that belong to a given ranch. Freeze brands can also be used to denote a breed in general or to identify an animal with a specific breed registry. The brand is typically placed on a horse's haunches or its neck, near the crest.

==== Legal Considerations ====
In the United States brands applied by any method often must be registered with a state or county office. In some jurisdictions, it is illegal to brand an animal without first registering the design with a state office. The following table summarizes the legal recognition and requirements for equine freeze brands in the United States:

State	Branding required?	Equine brand registration?	Equine freeze brands recognized?	Cost (2026)	Renewal interval	Ref.
Alabama	❌	✅	✅	$20	3 years	
Alaska	❌	✅	✅	$1 + $2 renewal	5 years	
Arizona	only cattle	✅	✅	$50	5 years	
Arkansas	❌	✅	✅	$5 + $10 renewal	5 years	
California	❌	✅	✅	$70	2 years	
Colorado	❌	✅	✅	$200	annual	
Connecticut	❌	❌	❌	❌	❌	
Delaware	❌	❌	❌	❌	❌	
Florida	❌	✅	✅	$10	10 years	
Georgia	❌	✅	❌	Free	10 years	
Hawaii	❌	✅	✅	$10	5 years	
Idaho	✅	✅	✅	$50–$150	5 years	
Illinois	❌	✅	❌	$15	5 years	
Indiana	❌	✅	✅	Free	5 years	
Iowa	❌	✅	✅	$25	5 years	
Kansas	❌	✅	✅	$45–$50	5 years	
Kentucky	❌	❌	✅	$10 + $5 renewal	5 years	
Louisiana	❌	✅	✅	$15 for 5 years, $75 for lifetime	5 years	
Maine	❌	❌	❌	❌	❌	
Maryland	❌	❌	❌	❌	❌	
Massachusetts	❌	❌	❌	❌	❌	
Michigan	❌	❌	❌	❌	❌	
Minnesota	❌	✅	✅	$10	10 years	
Mississippi	❌	✅	✅	Free	5 years	
Missouri	❌	✅	✅	$35 + $20 renewal	annual	
Montana	❌	✅	✅	$210	10 years	
Nebraska	❌	✅	✅	$100 + $50 renewal	4 years	
Nevada	❌	✅	✅	$235	4 years	
New Hampshire	❌	❌	❌	❌	❌	
New Jersey	❌	❌	❌	❌	❌	
New Mexico	✅	✅	✅	$100	3 years	
New York	❌	✅^{a}	❌	❌	❌	
North Carolina	❌	✅	✅	$25	10 years	
North Dakota	❌	✅	✅	$25	5 years	
Ohio	❌	✅	✅	$25	5 years	
Oklahoma	❌	❌^{b}	✅	$40	5 years	
Oregon	❌	✅	✅	$25	4 years	
Pennsylvania	❌	✅	✅	$25 + $5 renewal	5 years	
Rhode Island	❌	❌	❌	❌	❌	
South Carolina	❌	✅	✅	$3	does not expire	
South Dakota	❌	✅	✅	$90	5 years	
Tennessee	❌	❌	✅	$25	5 years	
Texas	❌	✅	✅	various^{c}	10 years	
Utah	only range stock	✅	✅	$250 + $175 renewal	5 years	
Vermont	❌	✅	✅	$10 + $5 renewal	5 years	
Virginia	❌	❌	❌	❌	❌	
Washington	❌	✅	✅	free + $132 renewal	4 years	
West Virginia	❌	❌	❌	❌	❌	
Wisconsin	❌	✅	✅	$20 + $10 renewal	10 years	
Wyoming	❌	✅	✅	$200	10 years	

===== Notes =====
^{a} New York State maintains a brand registry ("brand book") but it does not recognize either freeze or hot brands as official identification for an animal.

^{b} In Oklahoma brand registrations are not required, however those that have been registered with the state receive higher priority in the state-arbitrated resolution of ownership disputes.

^{c} Brand registrations are issued and held by county clerks rather than the state of Texas. This was a response to the immense number of brands required by ranching operations in that state; more than 100,000 distinct marks are in use.

==== Pat Farrell's Alpha-Angle Freeze Mark ====
A specialized brand system is required to mark many animals such that each can be individually identified. Arabic numerals are difficult to brand much smaller than 4 inches (10 cm) tall. Further, conventional numbers can be altered, with a branded "3" easily turned into an "8," potentially shifting apparent ownership of the horse. It is also inconvenient to carry a dozen or more unique brands into the field if animals must be branded there.

These facts spurred Pat Farrell, wife of the inventor of Cryo-branding, to create the Alpha-Angle Freeze Mark in the early 1970s. Her goal was a set of symbols that could produce unique brands, remained legible for longer than alphanumeric brands, could not easily be tampered with, and reduced the number of branding irons that must be carried into the field. The Alpha-Angle Freeze Mark is composed of symbols representing 46 US States and the Federal Government as well as 20 breeds of horse.

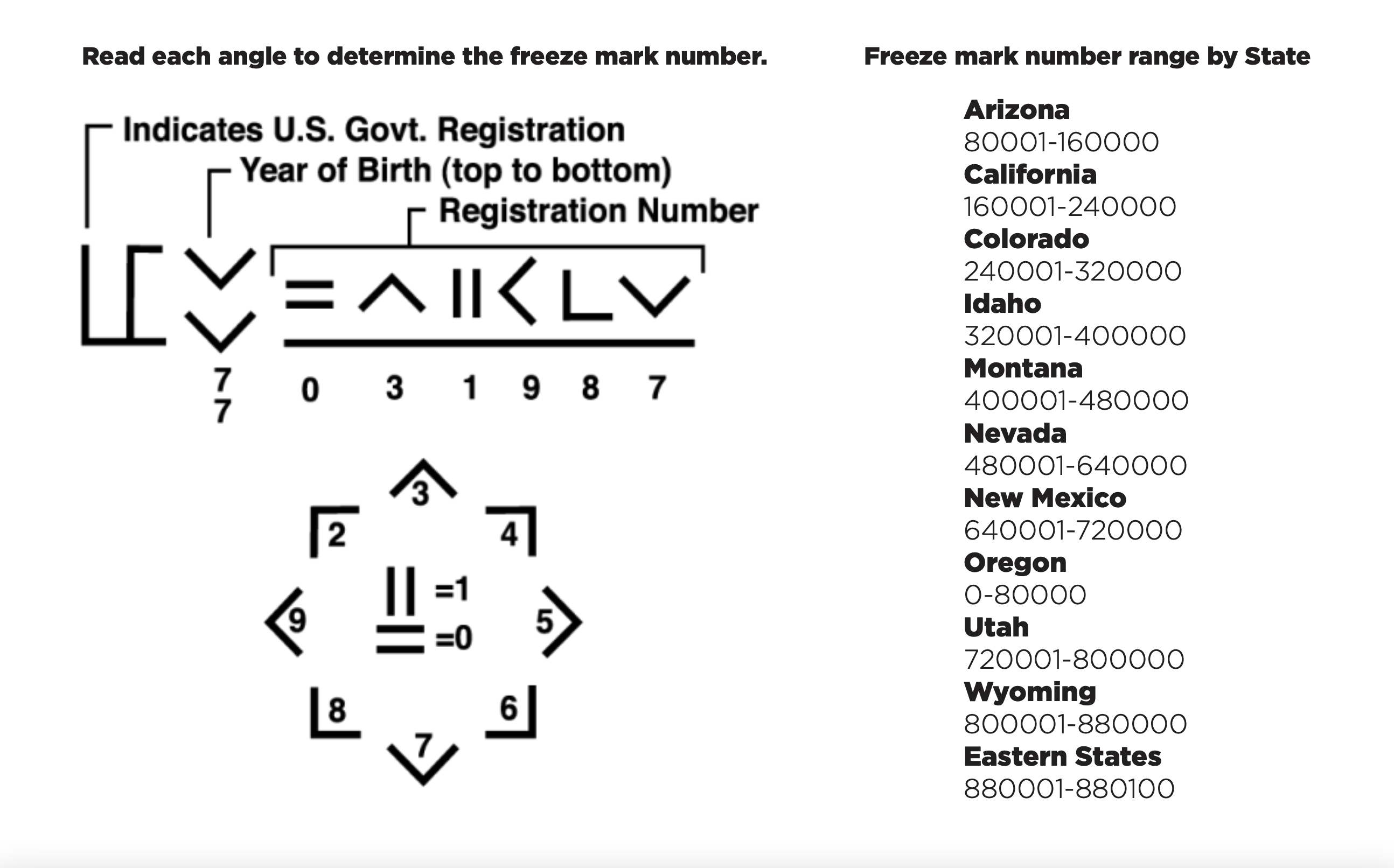
Key to the International Alpha Angle system of branding used by the Bureau of Land Management to identify wild horses since the late 1970s. The system has since become popular among commercial livestock operations.

To complement these symbols Farrell also invented a number system requiring only two signs. In this number system, the numerals 0 through 9 can be produced using two brands. One is shaped like a right angle (∟ ) and the other is like parallel lines (ll ). Different numerals are created depending on the orientation of these two symbols. For example, vertical parallel lines (ll ) stand for 1 and horizontal lines (=) for zero. The other eight digits are created by rotating the ∟-shaped brand clockwise through 360º. Using only these two brands, the Alpha-Angle Freeze Mark system can encode any sequence of numbers. This was a great improvement on traditional numerals requiring 10 separate irons, each of which must be applied either one after the other or simultaneously with an assistant.

The easiest way to remember the code is to think of the even numbers as making a square and the odd numbers, a diamond. Superimposing the diamond onto the square gives the full series of 2–9, which can be easily counted in the mind by starting with 2 in the top left-hand corner of the square. This mnemonic does not include the zero and 1 symbols, which are much easier to remember by rote (see diagram at right.)

The white hair often produced by freeze branding is highly amenable to simple shapes such as angles and lines. Farrell's Alpha Angle Freeze Mark was later adopted by the Bureau of Land Management (BLM) and the U.S. Forest Service as their preferred means of tracking captured wild equids. Alpha-Angle brands can be used one at a time or set into a frame that enables all the irons needed for a particular brand to be chilled, shaken off and applied to the animal's skin at once. The Alpha-Angle system was patented by Farrell in 1972, originally for a punch gun made to tattoo the ears of livestock with Alpha-Angle symbols.

The simplicity of her number system means that users can construct their irons with little difficulty, an important consideration in the American West. Alpha-Angle numerals remain the best-known and most widely used part of her branding system.

===== BLM Wild Equid Branding =====
Starting in April 1978, all free-ranging mustangs and burros rounded up by the BLM or the U.S. Forest Service have been freeze branded on the left side of the neck using Farrell's Alpha-Angle system. This is generally done at a short-term holding facility along with basic medical care like vaccination and deworming. Captured mustangs then enter the BLM's adoption program. Capture, branding, medical screening and adoption have long been the preferred means of controlling feral horse populations in the US. So efficient is Farrell's system and so successful was this tagging project that since the early 1980s it has become extremely rare to run across an adult mustang without a freeze brand.

The BLM uses the following sequence for identification:

1. The symbol of the registering organization (in the diagram above this is the US Government);
2. the last two digits of the animal's year of birth (estimated from teeth), stacked vertically;
3. the registration number, a unique sequence of angles arranged horizontally.
  1. The first two numerals of the registration number indicate the BLM facility at which the horse was processed (this is not always in the same state where the horse was captured).
  2. The next four numerals compose the horse's tag number and are randomly assigned during processing.
4. Finally, a horizontal line beneath the registration number. This line acts as an orientation mark for the angle numerals. This is done in case the horse's skin shifts as it grows, if it loses weight or becomes cresty (an overabundance of fat deposition at the crest of the neck). Such distortions can appear to change one numeral into another. Angles are always interpreted with reference to the horizontal line.

If a mustang has been offered for adoption three times and has not settled at any of its new locations the horse is referred to as "Sale Authority." This means that BLM is legally authorized to sell the horse to anyone willing to buy it. The BLM is prohibited by law from controlling wild horse populations through culling, but Sale Authority sometimes amounts to the same thing as intractable horses are often sold to slaughterhouses or their agents. Sale Authority is indicated with a large ᑌ shape after the registration number.

If a horse is neither adopted nor deemed Sale Authority it is often housed at a long-term BLM pasture. In this case a second brand is added at the top of their left rear leg, the croup. The second brand aids in identifying a particular horse among the hundreds or thousands under care. This mark uses Arabic numerals 4 inches (10 cm) high and displays the horse's tag number. If a horse has undergone special medical treatment the hip brand is preceded by a letter code. A hip brand preceded by "LB" for example indicates that a mare was treated with fertility control by BLM before being released back onto the range.

=== Humans ===
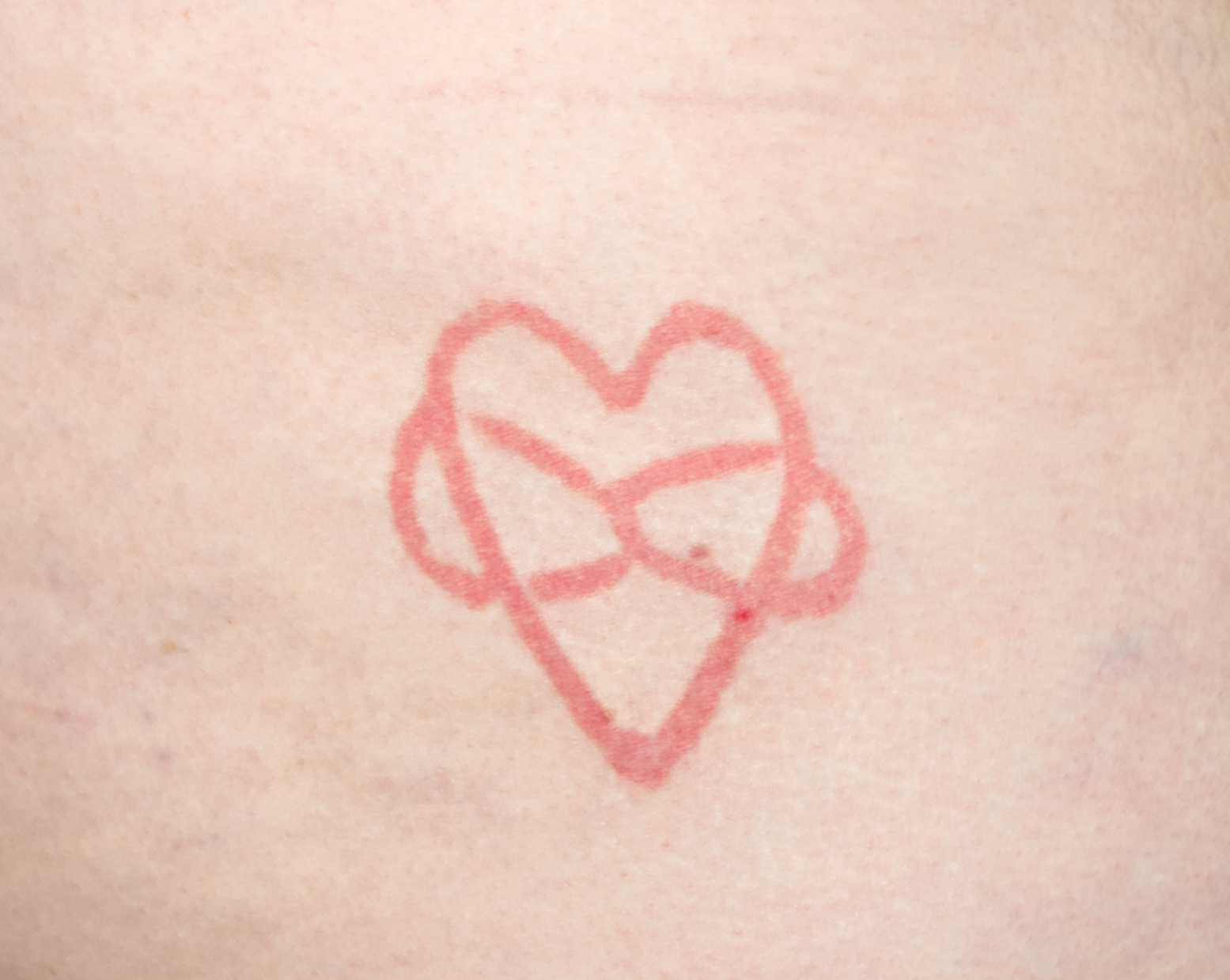
An infinity heart poly symbol on a thigh.

Due to its success in livestock operations cryobranding has attracted the attention of humans in pursuit of novel body modifications. It remains a rare practice, with many instances carried out in an amateur setting. Most report pain, edema and sloughing of skin. Branding times vary but most are strongly overbranded, perhaps due a naive assumption that human skin requires the same brand durations as those of cattle and horses. Branding times up to 30 seconds have been recorded, although even 10 seconds have proved sufficient to produce a third degree cryoburn.

This instance of a 10-second freeze brand formed the basis of the first medical report on a case of human cryobranding. The case involved a 33-year-old woman who received a large runic cryobrand to her inner forearm. The brand was cooled in a dry ice isopropanol bath for 5 minutes and then applied to her hairless skin for 10 seconds. The woman developed a third degree burn at the center of the imprint and sought medical attention 18 days after being branded. Her wound was treated with the same protocol for thermal burns and closed approximately 8 weeks after branding and 5 weeks after treatment began. At six months the final brand was somewhat hyperpigmented, with a central scar from the open wound.

The mild steel branding iron used in this case bore a combination of two vowels from the Elder Futhark alphabet, an ᛁ superimposed on a ᛟ (equivalent to the English vowels i and o). Ranchers strongly advise that a gap be left in a brand face where the pattern has crossing lines. Solid line crossings in both hot and freeze branding irons frequently overbrand stock and can lead to tissue damage that blurs the final result. That was the case in this report, where the runic freeze branding iron contained a crossing of three lines.

One of the only human self-reports on a cryobranding in the scientific literature relates "a sharp tingling sensation followed by numbness" as the subject used a small cryobrand to mark his own forearm. There is little information regarding the safety or long-term effectiveness of human cryobranding.

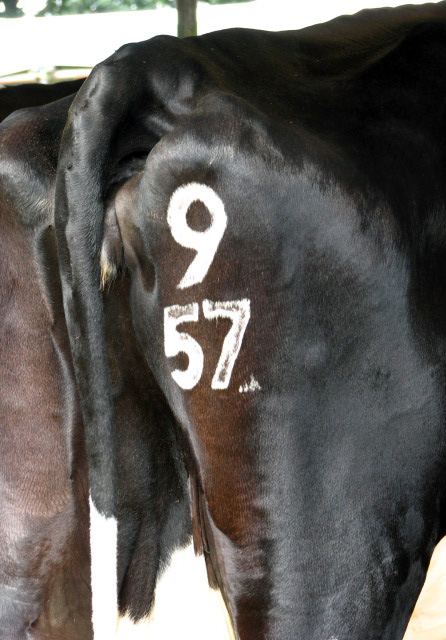
A cow with a numerical freeze brand on its hindquarters, most often used to track the animal during commercial rearing.

=== Cattle ===
Entire herds of cattle are often marked with a single freeze brand to indicate where they belong or to whom they should be returned. Other means of achieving the same end include ear tags, ear notches, ear tattoos, and electronic identification by subcutaneous microchipping, ear tag microchips or rumen bolus microchips retained in a cow's stomach. These are often used in conjunction with freeze branding, where one method serves to distinguish an individual animal and the other, usually the freeze brand, denoting the herd.

Although it is generally accepted that freeze branding is less painful than hot-iron branding, it is still less frequently seen in cattle than the traditional technique. This is because freeze branding requires more expensive materials, some of which are difficult to store and distribute. Hot-branding is comparatively simple and cheap, as all that is required are a fire and the branding iron.

=== Scientific tracking ===
Freeze branding is one of the few means of permanently distinguishing an animal that meets all of William Ricker's requirements for an effective marking system for wild animal research. Ricker developed his requirements while working as a fisheries scientist. He sought ways to mark animals used in scientific experiments such that their markings did not influence scientific data. His four requirements for such markings are:

1. The marking should not change the animal's behavior or their ability to survive, including detection by predators;
2. it should not affect the animal's susceptibility to capture;
3. it should allow each individual to be marked uniquely and
4. it should be permanent.

Many species have been experimentally freeze branded to assess the technique's suitability for animal tracking in scientific research. (See Freeze brand § Table of branding durations above for some of these attempts.) Amphibians have proved one of the more successful applications, though freeze branding in scientific research remains relatively rare compared to traditional methods like tagging and radio tracking.

==== Frogs ====
A Ricker-complete marking system using freeze brands has been tested on tailed frogs. Previous methods of marking wild amphibians intended for recapture included hot branding, toe clipping, jaw tags, elastic waistbands and India ink scarification. These can be broadly categorized into tagging and mutilation. In scientific circles freeze branding is considered a kind of tagging: it has no permanent effect other than to identify individuals. Mutilation, on the other hand, can strongly affect an individual's life history. This may subsequently pollute scientific data gathered from studying animals that have been marked through mutilation. Toe-clipping is commonly used but it can affect the anuran's motor skills and also cause weight loss. These consequences of human interference will all affect an animal's mortality rate and hence invalidate scientific conclusions drawn from their study. Freeze branding is therefore seen as a permanent and low-impact means of tracking amphibians.

Freeze branding was tested on frogs that were released into the wild after branding and later recaptured. One set of researchers used a branding iron made from a length of copper wire, cooled in a dry ice ethanol bath for 30 minutes. The brand was then applied to the anuran's skin for about ten seconds. The brand was then re-cooled for 20–30 seconds before being applied to a new frog. By using various numbers and orientations while differentiating for sex, it is possible to create a sufficient number of combinations to mark large populations of frogs.

The frog's brands were healed and readable within 24 hours of application, making this method nearly immediately effective as a tracking system. The branded area gradually loses its pigmentation such that older brands become almost completely transparent, increasing their legibility over time.

==== Fish ====
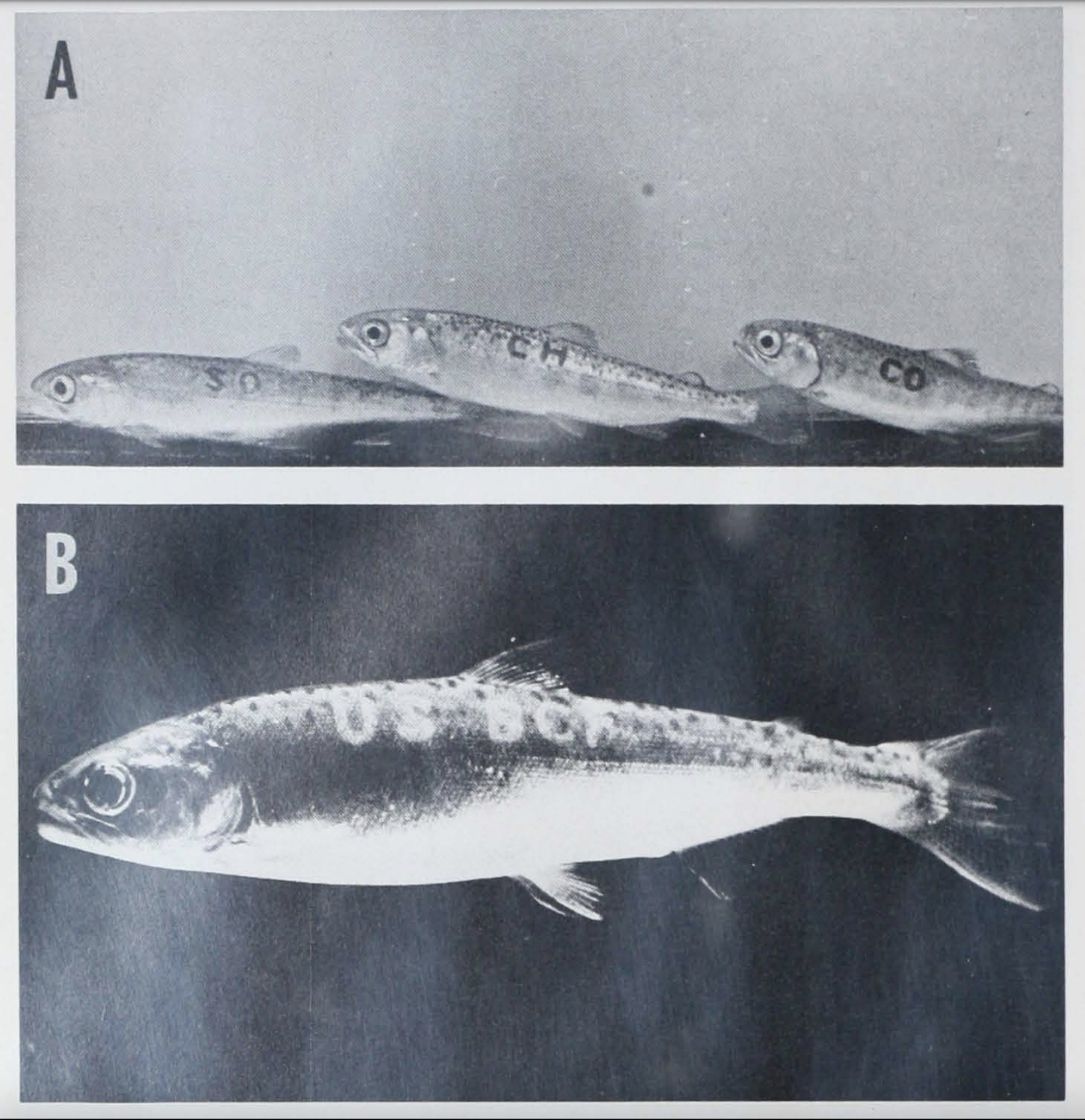
Yearling coho and chinook salmon freeze branded dorsally

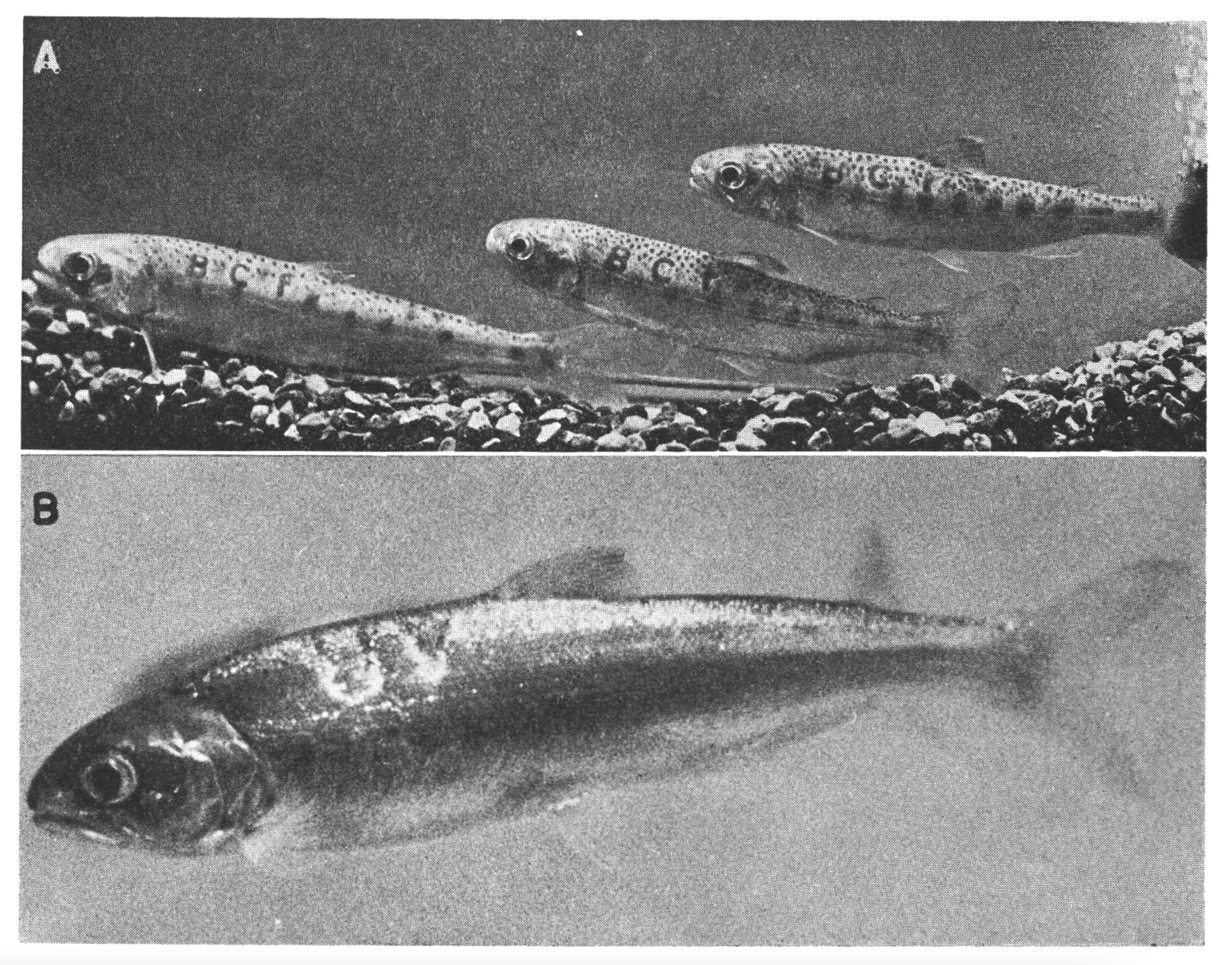
Juvenile salmon freeze branded with "BCF" (top) and "UV" (below)

== See also ==
- Horse markings
- Scarification
- Cryotherapy
