= Washington State University College of Veterinary Medicine =

Coordinates: 46°43′41″N 117°9′30″W

- Type: Public; Veterinary school
- Established: 1899
- Dean: Dori Borjenson
- Location: Pullman, Washington, U.S.
- Website: www.vetmed.wsu.edu

The Washington State University College of Veterinary Medicine (CVM) is the veterinary school and one of the ten colleges of Washington State University. Established in 1899, it is the sole veterinary school in the state of Washington and one of the oldest in the United States.

== Departments ==
The College of Veterinary Medicine is organized into three departments, schools and units:

- Department of Veterinary Clinical Science
- Department of Integrative Physiology and Neuroscience
- Department of Veterinary Microbiology and Pathology
- The Paul G. Allen School for Global Animal Health
- The School of Molecular Biosciences
- Center for Reproductive Biology

=== Accreditation ===
The college is fully accredited by four key national accrediting agencies:

- The American Veterinary Medical Association Council on Education (AVMA-COE)
- The Association for Assessment and Accreditation of Laboratory Animal Care (AAALAC),
- The American Association of Veterinary Laboratory Diagnosticians (AAVLD),
- The American Animal Hospital Association (AAHA).

== Research ==
The College of Veterinary Medicine conducts abundant research toward the benefit of animal and human well being. An example of this goal was the development of less painful freeze branding for livestock by college lecturer Keith Farrell in the mid-1960s. In the fiscal year of 2006, the CVM had funded with more than $12.5 million in conducting research, that specialized in food-and water-borne diseases, neurobiology, cardiovascular medicine and physiology, immunology and infectious diseases, and microbial genomics and proteomics.
