= Chlorofluorodiiodomethane =

Names
- Preferred IUPAC name Chloro(fluoro)di(iodo)methane
- Other names Chloro(fluoro)diiodomethane

Identifiers
CAS Number	1495-15-4
3D model (JSmol)	Interactive image
ChemSpider	24590927
PubChem CID	85696063
- InChI: InChI=1S/CClFI2/c2-1(3,4)5 Key: KRMKVMPRGWVUNY-UHFFFAOYSA-N
- SMILES: C(F)(Cl)(I)I

Properties
Chemical formula	CClFI_{2}
Molar mass	320.27 g·mol^{−1}
Density	3.2±0.1 g/cm³
Boiling point	148.1 °C (298.6 °F; 421.2 K)

Hazards
Flash point	43.4±18.4 °C

Related compounds
Related compounds	Bromofluoroiodomethane; Dibromofluoroiodomethane; Bromodifluoroiodomethane; Chlorofluoroiodomethane; Chlorodifluoroiodomethane
- Except where otherwise noted, data are given for materials in their standard state (at 25 °C [77 °F], 100 kPa). Infobox references

Chlorofluorodiiodomethane is a tetrahalomethane with the chemical formula CClFI_{2}. This is an organic compound containing two iodine atoms, one chlorine atom, and one fluorine atom attached to the methane backbone. Some sources claim that the compound still expects isolation.
