= Difluoroiodomethane =

Names
- Preferred IUPAC name difluoro(iodo)methane

Identifiers
CAS Number	1493-03-4
3D model (JSmol)	Interactive image
ChemSpider	2055525
ECHA InfoCard	100.199.859
EC Number	674-488-4
PubChem CID	2775155
CompTox Dashboard (EPA)	DTXSID90379419
- InChI: InChI=1S/CHF2I/c2-1(3)4/h1H Key: YSLFMGDEEXOKHF-UHFFFAOYSA-N
- SMILES: C(F)(F)I

Properties
Chemical formula	CHF_{2}I
Molar mass	177.920 g·mol^{−1}
Appearance	Colorless clear liquid
Density	2.4 g/mL
Melting point	−122.0 °C (−187.6 °F; 151.2 K)
Boiling point	21.6 °C (70.9 °F; 294.8 K)

Hazards
- GHS labelling
Pictograms	(GHS07: Exclamation mark) (GHS02: Flammable)
Signal word	Danger
Flash point	115 °C
- Except where otherwise noted, data are given for materials in their standard state (at 25 °C [77 °F], 100 kPa). Infobox references

Difluoroiodomethane is a trihalomethane with the chemical formula CHF_{2}I. This is a halomethane containing two fluorine atoms and one iodine atom attached to methane backbone.

== Synthesis ==
The compound can be obtained by the action of mercury(I) fluoride on iodoform:

CHI_{3} + Hg_{2}F_{2} → CHF_{2}I + Hg_{2}I↓

== Physical properties ==
The compound forms colorless to almost colorless clear liquid. It is flammable and irritating to the eyes, respiratory tract, and skin.
