= Chlorofluoromethane =

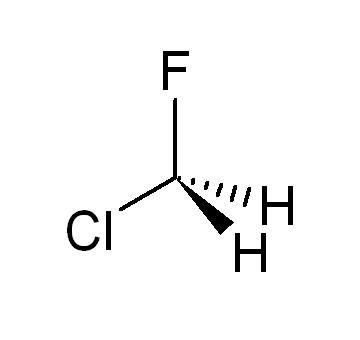

Names
- Preferred IUPAC name Chloro(fluoro)methane
- Other names Chlorofluoromethane; Fluorochloromethane; Chloro-fluoro-methane; Methylene chloride fluoride Monochloromonofluoromethane; CFM; Khladon 31; Freon 31; HCFC 31; R 31

Identifiers
CAS Number	593-70-4
3D model (JSmol)	Interactive image
ChemSpider	11153
ECHA InfoCard	100.008.914
EC Number	209-803-2
KEGG	C19362
PubChem CID	11643
UNII	CUM8OUO53E
CompTox Dashboard (EPA)	DTXSID6020305
- InChI: InChI=1S/CH2ClF/c2-1-3/h1H2 Key: XWCDCDSDNJVCLO-UHFFFAOYSA-N; InChI=1/CH2ClF/c2-1-3/h1H2 Key: XWCDCDSDNJVCLO-UHFFFAOYAV
- SMILES: C(F)Cl

Properties
Chemical formula	CH_{2}ClF
Molar mass	68.48 g/mol
Appearance	Gas
Density	1.271 kg/m^{3} at 20 °C
Melting point	−133.0 °C (−207.4 °F; 140.2 K)
Boiling point	−9.1 °C (15.6 °F; 264.0 K)
Henry's law constant (k_{H})	0.15 mol.kg^{−1}.bar^{−1}

Hazards
- Occupational safety and health (OHS/OSH)
Main hazards	Carc. Cat. 3
- Except where otherwise noted, data are given for materials in their standard state (at 25 °C [77 °F], 100 kPa). verify (what is ?) Infobox references

Chlorofluoromethane or Freon 31 is the hydrochlorofluorocarbon (HCFC) with the formula CH_{2}ClF. It is a colorless, odorless, flammable gas. It is a class II ozone depleting substance and in accordance with the Montreal protocol, its production and import were banned on 1 January 2015.

== Uses ==
Pyrolysis of a mixture of dichlorofluoromethane and chlorofluoromethane gives hexafluorobenzene:

3 CHCl_{2}F + 3 CH_{2}ClF → C_{6}F_{6} + 9 HCl

It was used as a refrigerant and has an ozone depletion potential of 0.02.

== Additional data ==
Its crystal structure is monoclinic with space group P2_{1} and lattice constants a = 6.7676, b = 4.1477, c = 5.0206 (0.10^{−1} nm), β = 108.205°.

At an altitude of 22 km, traces of chlorofluoromethane occur (148 ppt).
