= Mercury fluoride =

Mercury fluoride can refer to:

- Mercury(I) fluoride (dimercury difluoride, mercury monofluoride, mercurous fluoride), Hg_{2}F_{2}
- Mercury(II) fluoride (mercury difluoride, mercuric fluoride), HgF_{2}
- Mercury(IV) fluoride (mercury tetrafluoride, permercuric fluoride), HgF_{4}

== Gallery ==
Mercury fluorides
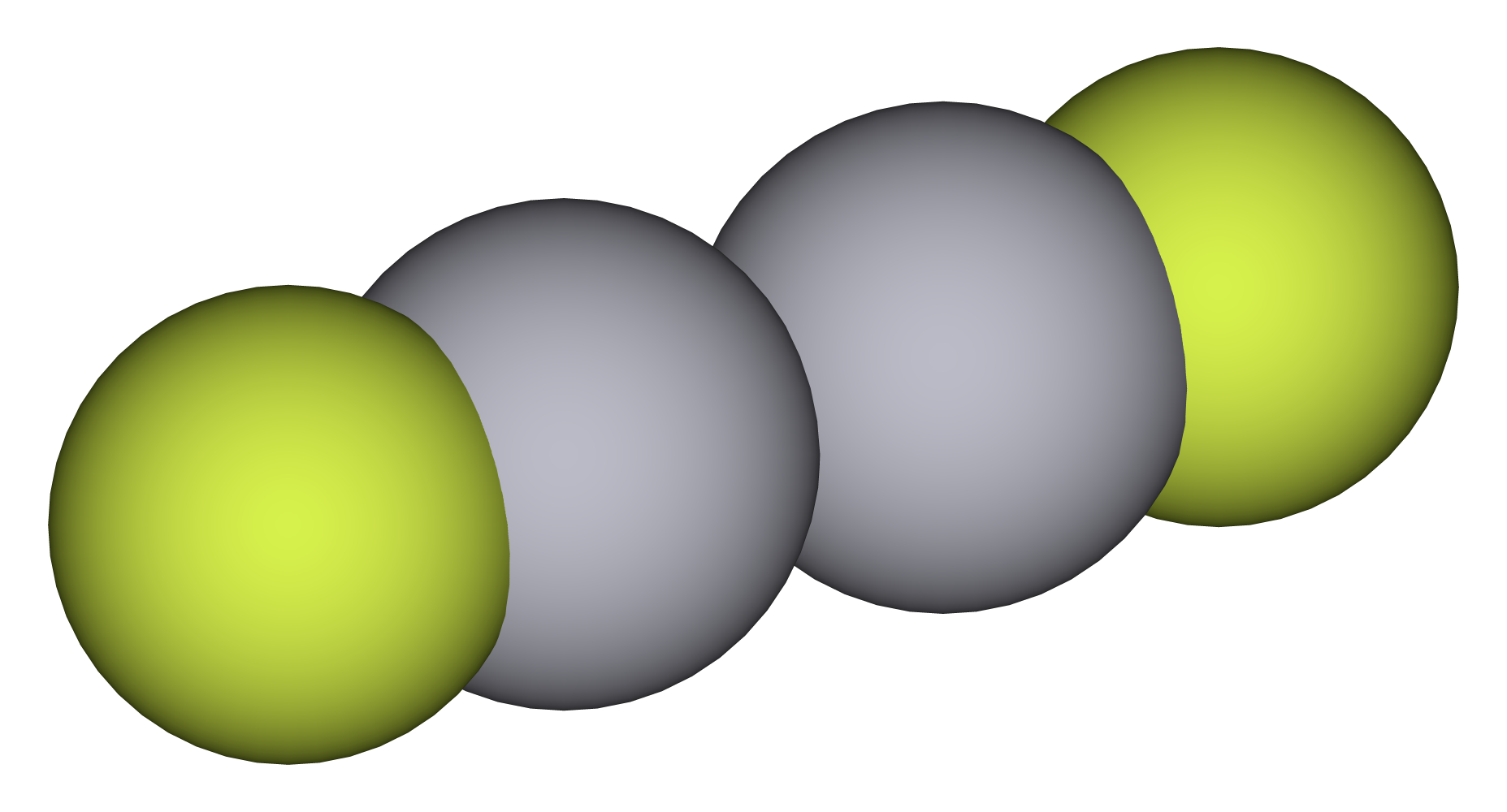
Molecular structure of mercury(I) fluoride.

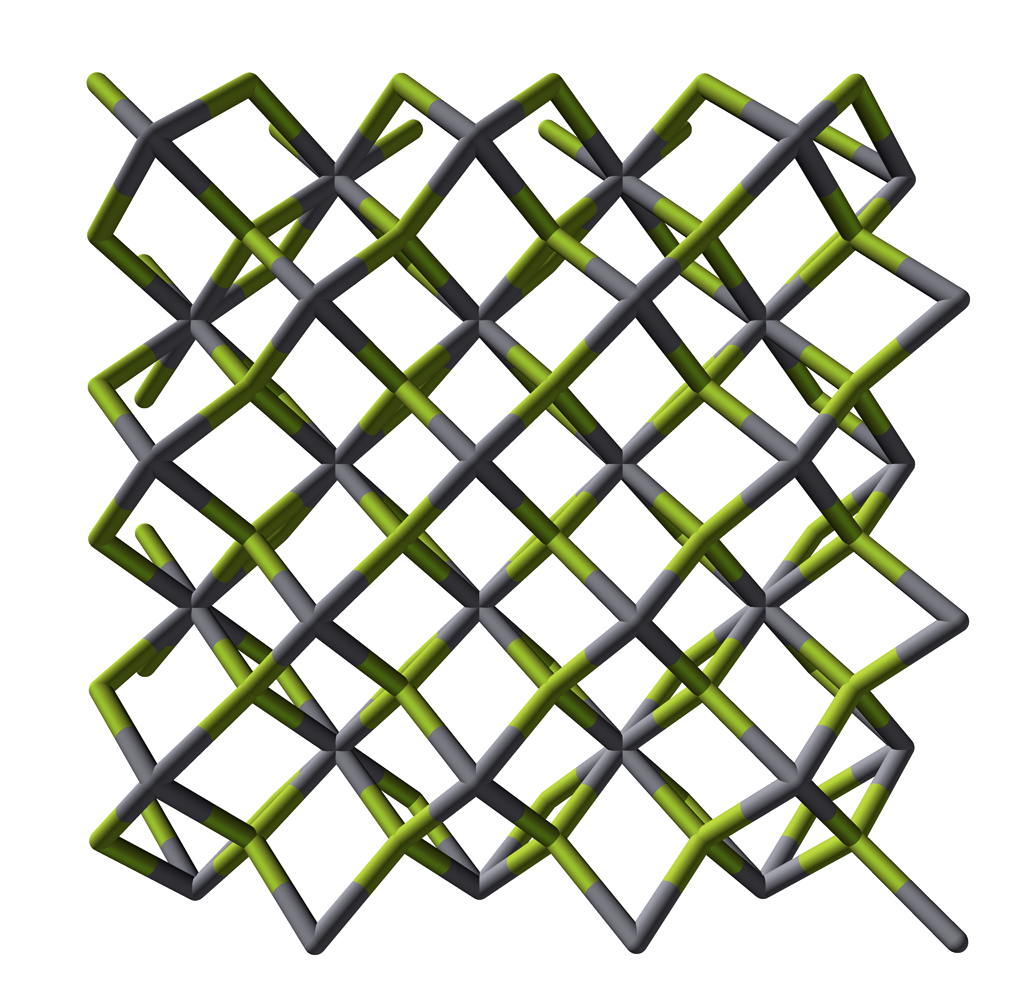
Crystal structure of mercury(II) fluoride.

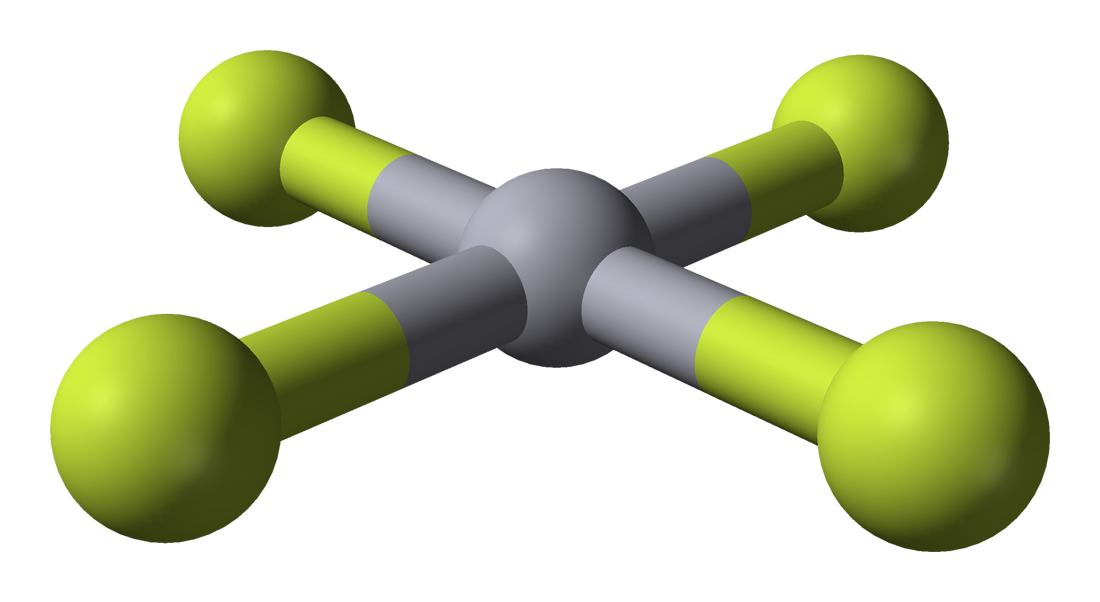
Molecular structure of mercury(IV) fluoride.
