= Chlorodifluoroiodomethane =

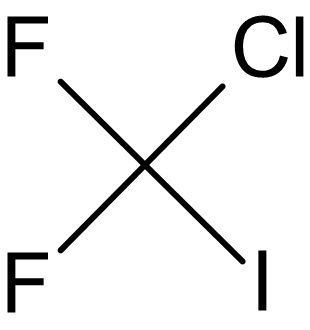

Names
- Preferred IUPAC name Chloro(difluoro)iodomethane
- Other names: Difluorochloroiodomethane; Chloro-difluoro-iodomethane

Identifiers
| CAS Number | 420-49-5 |
| 3D model (JSmol) | Interactive image |
| ChemSpider | 10752007 |
| PubChem CID | 22016178 |
- InChI: InChI=1S/CClF2I/c2-1(3,4)5 Key: CDNQVRRPSZBJQC-UHFFFAOYSA-N
- SMILES: C(F)(F)(Cl)I

Properties
| Chemical formula | CClF_{2}I |
| Molar mass | 212.36 g·mol^{−1} |
| Density | 2.5 g/cm³ |
| Boiling point | 34.6 °C (94.3 °F; 307.8 K) |

Hazards
| Flash point | -25.3 °C |

Related compounds
| Related compounds | Chlorofluoroiodomethane; Dichlorofluoroiodomethane; Chlorofluorodiiodomethane |
- Except where otherwise noted, data are given for materials in their standard state (at 25 °C [77 °F], 100 kPa). Infobox references

Chlorodifluoroiodomethane is a tetrahalomethane with the chemical formula CClF_{2}I. This is a halomethane containing two fluorine atoms, one chlorine atom, and one iodine atom attached to the methane backbone.

== Synthesis ==
It can be prepared by reacting methyl difluorochloroacetate, LiCl/HMPA, and iodine or iodine monobromide at 90–95 °C, or by reacting silver difluorochloroacetate and iodine at 120–260 °C:

CClF_{2}COOAg + I_{2} → CClF_{2}I + CO_{2} + AgI

The compound can also be obtained by the inductively coupled plasma (12 MHz) reaction of hexafluoroethane or trifluorochloromethane with iodine. Other methods are also known.
