= Bromofluoroiodomethane =

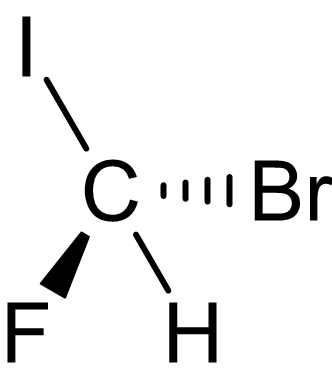

Names
- Preferred IUPAC name Bromo(fluoro)iodomethane
- Other names bromo-fluoro-iodo-methane

Identifiers
CAS Number	1512-27-2
3D model (JSmol)	Interactive image
ChemSpider	9656646
PubChem CID	11481826
- InChI: InChI=1S/CHBrFI/c2-1(3)4/h1H Key: FMFUPOAGBUBEFH-UHFFFAOYSA-N
- SMILES: FC(Br)I

Properties
Chemical formula	CHBrFI
Molar mass	238.826 g·mol^{−1}
Appearance	Light yellow liquid
Density	2.9 g/cm^{3}
Boiling point	102 °C (216 °F; 375 K)
- Except where otherwise noted, data are given for materials in their standard state (at 25 °C [77 °F], 100 kPa). Infobox references

Bromofluoroiodomethane is a trihalomethane with the chemical formula CHBrFI. This complex organic compound is characterized by having three halogen atoms—fluorine, bromine, and iodine—attached to a methane backbone. The molecule is chiral.

== Synthesis ==
The compound can be prepared by reacting silver bromoacetate with iodine at 180-260 °C in a vacuum, or by reacting diiodomethane with mercury difluoride at 60 °C.

CHBrI_{2} + HgF_{2} ⟶ CHBrFI + HgI_{2}

Ethyl zinc iodide reacts with difluoroiodomethane to produce difluoromethyl zinc iodide, which is tautomerized with fluoroiodomethyl zinc fluoride. It can also react with bromine to produce bromofluoroiodomethane.
