= Dichlorofluoromethane =

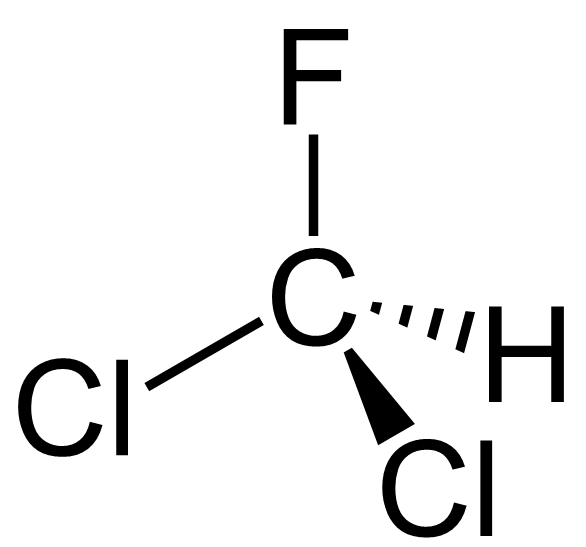

Names
- Preferred IUPAC name Dichloro(fluoro)methane
- Other names Dichlorofluoromethane; Fluorodichloromethane; Monofluorodichloromethane; Dichloromonofluoromethane; Freon 21; Refrigerant 21; R 21; HCFC 21; Algofrene Type 5 Arcton 7 Halon 112; UN 1029; Genetron 21

Identifiers
| CAS Number | 75-43-4 |
| 3D model (JSmol) | Interactive image |
| ChEMBL | ChEMBL116813 |
| ChemSpider | 6130 |
| ECHA InfoCard | 100.000.791 |
| EC Number | 200-869-8 |
| PubChem CID | 6370 |
| RTECS number | PA8400000 |
| UNII | 7GAO4CRJ0B |
| UN number | 1029 |
| CompTox Dashboard (EPA) | DTXSID7052498 |
- InChI: InChI=1S/CHCl2F/c2-1(3)4/h1H Key: UMNKXPULIDJLSU-UHFFFAOYSA-N; InChI=1/CHCl2F/c2-1(3)4/h1H Key: UMNKXPULIDJLSU-UHFFFAOYAU
- SMILES: ClC(Cl)F

Properties
| Chemical formula | CHCl_{2}F |
| Molar mass | 102.92 g/mol |
| Appearance | Colorless gas |
| Odor | Ether-like |
| Density | 1.405 kg/m^{3} at 9 °C; 1.366 kg/m^{3} at 25 °C |
| Melting point | −135 °C (−211 °F; 138 K) |
| Boiling point | 8.92 °C (48.06 °F; 282.07 K) |
| Solubility in water | 9.420 g/L at 30 °C |
| log P | 1.55 |
| Vapor pressure | 160 kPa |
| Henry's law constant (k_{H}) | 0.19 (mol·kg·bar)^{−1} |
| Magnetic susceptibility (χ) | −48.8·10^{−6} cm^{3}/mol |
| Thermal conductivity | 0.0086 W/m·K (300 K) |

Hazards
- GHS labelling
| Pictograms | (GHS07: Exclamation mark) |
| Signal word | Warning |
| Hazard statements | H420 |
| Precautionary statements | P410+P403, P502 |
| Flash point | Non-flammable |
| Autoignition temperature | 522 °C (972 °F; 795 K) |
- Lethal dose or concentration (LD, LC)
| LC_{50} (median concentration) | >800,000 mg/m^{3} (mouse, 2 hr); 49,900 ppm (rat, 4 hr) |
| LC_{Lo} (lowest published) | 100,000 ppm (guinea pig, <1 hr); 100,000 ppm (mouse, <1 hr) |
- NIOSH (US health exposure limits)
| PEL (Permissible) | TWA 1000 ppm (4200 mg/m^{3}) |
| REL (Recommended) | TWA 10 ppm (40 mg/m^{3}) |
| IDLH (Immediate danger) | 5000 ppm |
- Except where otherwise noted, data are given for materials in their standard state (at 25 °C [77 °F], 100 kPa). verify (what is ?) Infobox references

Dichlorofluoromethane or Freon 21 or R 21 is a halomethane or hydrochlorofluorocarbon with the formula CHCl_{2}F. It is a colorless and odorless gas. It is produced by fluorination of chloroform using a catalyst such as antimony trifluoride:

CHCl_{3} + HF → CHCl_{2}F + HCl

== Uses ==
Dichlorofluoromethane was used as a propellant and refrigerant. Due to its role in ozone depletion, dichlorofluoromethane has been largely phased out. It has ozone depletion potential 0.04. Production and consumption has been since 2004 reduced to 15% of level from 1989 and it is to be phased out in 2015 according to Montreal Protocol.

Pyrolysis of a mixture of dichlorofluoromethane and chlorofluoromethane gives hexafluorobenzene:

3 CHCl_{2}F + 3 CH_{2}ClF → C_{6}F_{6} + 9 HCl

== Additional physical data ==
Its critical point is at 178.5 °C (451.7 K) and 5.17 MPa (51.7 bar). At temperatures from 5 K to 105 K, it has one phase in the space group Pbca.

== Safety ==
Its toxicity is comparable to that of chloroform. Its TLV is 10 ppm.
