= Chlorofluoroiodomethane =

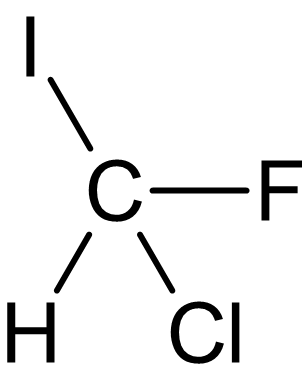

Names
- Preferred IUPAC name Chloro(fluoro)iodomethane

Identifiers
CAS Number	1512-28-3
3D model (JSmol)	Interactive image
ChemSpider	9346647
PubChem CID	11171555
CompTox Dashboard (EPA)	DTXSID90457569
- InChI: InChI=1S/CHClFI/c2-1(3)4/h1H Key: HLSRAOHMHGINPN-UHFFFAOYSA-N
- SMILES: C(F)(Cl)I

Properties
Chemical formula	CHClFI
Molar mass	194.37 g·mol^{−1}
Appearance	Light yellow liquid
Density	2.4 g/cm³
Boiling point	76.1 °C (169.0 °F; 349.2 K)
- Except where otherwise noted, data are given for materials in their standard state (at 25 °C [77 °F], 100 kPa). Infobox references

Chlorofluoroiodomethane is a trihalomethane with the chemical formula CHClFI. This complex organic compound is characterized by having three halogen atoms—fluorine, chlorine, and iodine—bonded to a methane backbone. The molecule is chiral.

== Synthesis ==
The compound can be obtained by reacting dichloromethane with mercury fluoride. Also, by heating dry (+)- strychnine fluorochloroiodoacetate at 100 mmHg and 110 °C can produce (+)-chlorofluoroiodomethane.

== Uses ==
Chlorofluoroiodomethane serves as a potentially important reagent in organic synthesis, especially for the transfer of halogenated methyl groups. Its three distinct carbon-halogen bonds exhibit varied reactivity, rendering it a flexible precursor for assembling more complex molecular structures.
