= Tetrahalomethane =

Class of chemical compounds

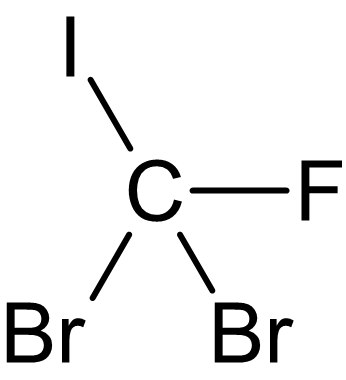
The chemical structure of fluorodibromoiodomethane

Tetrahalomethanes are chemical compounds in which all four hydrogen atoms of a methane molecule are replaced by halogen atoms—such as chlorine, bromine, fluorine, iodine, or astatine.

== Overview ==
The compounds are fully halogenated methane derivatives of general formula CF_{k}Cl_{l}Br_{m}I_{n}At_{p}, where:
$$k+l+m+n+p=4$$
Tetrahalomethanes are on the border of inorganic and organic chemistry, thus they can be assigned both inorganic and organic names by IUPAC: tetrafluoromethane - carbon tetrafluoride, tetraiodomethane - carbon tetraiodide, dichlorodifluoromethane - carbon dichloride difluoride.

== Taxonomy ==
Each halogen (F, Cl, Br, I, At) forms a corresponding halomethane, but their stability decreases in order CF_{4} > CCl_{4} > CBr_{4} > CI_{4} from exceptionally stable gaseous tetrafluoromethane with bond energy 515 kJ·mol^{−1} to solid tetraiodomethane, depending on bond energy.

Many mixed halomethanes are also known, such as CBrClF_{2}.

== Uses ==
Fluorine, chlorine, and sometimes bromine-substituted halomethanes were used as refrigerants, commonly known as CFCs (chlorofluorocarbons).

== See also ==
- Monohalomethane
- Dihalomethane
- Trihalomethane
