= Dibromochloroiodomethane =

Names
- Preferred IUPAC name Dibromo(chloro)iodomethane

Identifiers
3D model (JSmol)	Interactive image
ChemSpider	24590925
PubChem CID	71445078
- InChI: InChI=1S/CHBrClI/c2-1(3)4/h1H/t1-/m1/s1 Key: WUHPSARYLVYQOT-PVQJCKRUSA-N
- SMILES: [C@H](Cl)(Br)I

Properties
Chemical formula	CBr_{2}ClI
Molar mass	334.17 g·mol^{−1}
Density	3.3 g/cm^{3}
Boiling point	199.4 °C (390.9 °F; 472.5 K)

Hazards
Flash point	57.5±18.4 °C

Related compounds
Related compounds	Bromochloroiodomethane; Bromodichloroiodomethane; Bromochlorodiiodomethane; Dibromochloromethane; Dibromodichloromethane; Bromotrichloromethane; Bromochloromethane; Tribromoiodomethane
- Except where otherwise noted, data are given for materials in their standard state (at 25 °C [77 °F], 100 kPa). Infobox references

Dibromochloroiodomethane is a tetrahalomethane with the chemical formula CBr_{2}ClI. This is a tetrahalomethane where a central carbon atom is bonded to two bromine atoms, one chlorine atom, and one iodine atom.
