= Bromodichloroiodomethane =

Names
- Preferred IUPAC name Bromo(dichloro)iodomethane

Identifiers
CAS Number	40809-91-4
3D model (JSmol)	Interactive image
ChemSpider	24590923
PubChem CID	15682860
- InChI: InChI=1S/CBrCl2I/c2-1(3,4)5 Key: LQIBXLYNINRTIR-UHFFFAOYSA-N
- SMILES: ClC(Cl)(Br)I

Properties
Chemical formula	CBrCl_{2}I
Molar mass	289.72 g·mol^{−1}
Density	2.9 g/cm^{3}
Boiling point	171.4 °C (340.5 °F; 444.5 K)

Hazards
Flash point	57.5±18.4 °C

Related compounds
Related compounds	Bromochloroiodomethane; Dibromochloroiodomethane; Bromochlorodiiodomethane; Dibromochloromethane; Dibromodichloromethane; Bromotrichloromethane; Bromochloromethane; Tribromoiodomethane
- Except where otherwise noted, data are given for materials in their standard state (at 25 °C [77 °F], 100 kPa). Infobox references

Bromodichloroiodomethane is a tetrahalomethane with the chemical formula CBrCl_{2}I. This is an organic compound containing one bromine atom, two chlorine atom, and one iodine atom attached to the methane backbone.
