= Tribromochloromethane =

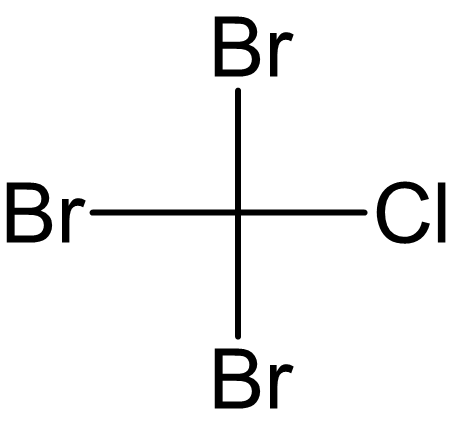

Names
- Preferred IUPAC name Tribromo(chloro)methane
- Other names: Bromoform-chlorine; Chlorotribromomethane

Identifiers
CAS Number	594-15-0
3D model (JSmol)	Interactive image
ChemSpider	62206
ECHA InfoCard	100.008.936
EC Number	209-827-3
PubChem CID	68984
UNII	277P08AUIZ
CompTox Dashboard (EPA)	DTXSID0024347
- InChI: InChI=1S/CBr3Cl/c2-1(3,4)5 Key: GKXZMEXQUWZGJK-UHFFFAOYSA-N
- SMILES: C(Cl)(Br)(Br)Br

Properties
Chemical formula	CBr_{3}Cl
Molar mass	287.17 g·mol^{−1}
Appearance	solid
Density	3.0 g/cm^{3}
Melting point	54 °C (129 °F; 327 K)
Boiling point	156.1 °C (313.0 °F; 429.2 K)
Solubility in water	soluble

Hazards
Flash point	52.8±8.5 °C

Related compounds
Related compounds	Dibromochloromethane; Dibromodichloromethane; Bromotrichloromethane; Bromochloromethane; Tribromofluoromethane; Tribromoiodomethane
- Except where otherwise noted, data are given for materials in their standard state (at 25 °C [77 °F], 100 kPa). Infobox references

Tribromochloromethane is a tetrahalomethane with the chemical formula CBr_{3}Cl. This is an organic compound containing three bromine atoms and one chlorine atom attached to the methane backbone.

== Synthesis ==
Tribromochloromethane can be prepared by the reflux reaction of carbon tetrachloride and aluminum tribromide or by the reaction of chlorocyclohexane and carbon tetrabromide in presence of ferric bromide.

CCl_{4} + AlBr_{3} ⟶ CBr_{3}Cl + AlCl_{3}
CBr_{4} + C_{6}H_{11}Cl ⟶ CBr_{3}Cl + C_{6}H_{11}Br

Also, dibromoformaldehyde oxime reacts with aqueous mercury dichloride solution, and then reacts with bromine and sodium acetate to obtain dibromochloronitrosomethane, which can then be refluxed with bromine to obtain tribromochloromethane.

== Chemical properties ==
Tribromochloromethane reacts with concentrated sulfuric acid to produce carbonyl bromide chloride:

CBr_{3}Cl + H_{2}SO_{4} → COBrCl + 2HBr + SO_{3}
