= Halon =

Halon may refer to:

- Haloalkane, or halogenoalkane, a group of chemical compounds consisting of alkanes with linked halogens (in particular, bromine-containing haloalkanes)
- Halomethane, a group of compounds used for extinguishing fires, among other uses
  - Halon 10001 (iodomethane)
  - Halon 1001 (bromomethane)
  - Halon 1011 (bromochloromethane, CH_{2}BrCl)
  - Halon 104 (carbon tetrachloride)
  - Halon 1103 (tribromofluoromethane)
  - Halon 112 (dichlorofluoromethane)
  - Halon 1201 (bromodifluoromethane)
  - Halon 1202 (dibromodifluoromethane)
  - Halon 1211 (bromochlorodifluoromethane, CF_{2}ClBr)
  - Halon 122 (dichlorodifluoromethane)
  - Halon 1301 (bromotrifluoromethane, CBrF_{3})
  - Halon 14 (tetrafluoromethane)
- Halon 2011B (1-bromo-2-chloroethane)
- Halon 2301 (1,1,1-trifluoro-2-bromoethane)
- Halon 2311 (1,1,1-trifluoro-2,2-chlorobromoethane, halothane)
- Halon 242 (1,2-dichlorotetrafluoroethane)
- Halon 2402 (dibromotetrafluoroethane, C_{2}Br_{2}F_{4})—used as a fire extinguisher
- Halon 2501 (pentafluorobromoethane)
- Halon 2600 (hexafluoroethane)
- Halon 4402 (1,1,2,2-tetrafluoro-1,4-dibromobutane)
