= Chloroiodomethane =

- Stereo, skeletal formula of chloroiodomethane with all explicit hydrogens added

- Spacefill model of chloroiodomethane

Names
- Preferred IUPAC name Chloro(iodo)methane
- Other names: Chloroiodomethane; Chloroiodomethane; Chloromethyl iodide

Identifiers
CAS Number	593-71-5
3D model (JSmol)	Interactive image
Beilstein Reference	1730802
ChemSpider	11154
ECHA InfoCard	100.008.915
EC Number	209-804-8
PubChem CID	11644
UNII	X7AF9WG7CX
CompTox Dashboard (EPA)	DTXSID50208034
- InChI: InChI=1S/CH2ClI/c2-1-3/h1H2 Key: PJGJQVRXEUVAFT-UHFFFAOYSA-N
- SMILES: ClCI

Properties
Chemical formula	CH_{2}ClI
Molar mass	176.38 g·mol^{−1}
Appearance	Colorless liquid
Density	2.422 g mL^{−1}
Boiling point	108 to 109 °C (226 to 228 °F; 381 to 382 K)
Henry's law constant (k_{H})	8.9 μmol Pa^{−1} kg^{−1}
Refractive index (n_{D})	1.582

Hazards
- GHS labelling
Pictograms	(GHS07: Exclamation mark)
Signal word	Warning
Hazard statements	H315, H319, H335
Precautionary statements	P261, P305+P351+P338
NFPA 704 (fire diamond)	1 1 0

Related compounds
Related alkanes	Chloromethane; Bromochloromethane; Dibromochloromethane
Related compounds	2-Chloroethanol
- Except where otherwise noted, data are given for materials in their standard state (at 25 °C [77 °F], 100 kPa). verify (what is ?) Infobox references

Chloroiodomethane is the halomethane with the formula is CH_{2}ClI. It is a colorless liquid of use in organic synthesis. Together with other iodomethanes, chloroiodomethane is produced by some microorganisms.

== Applications ==
Chloroiodomethane is used in cyclopropanation (Simmon-Smith reaction), where it often replaces diiodomethane because of higher yields and selectivity. It is also used in Mannich reaction, aminomethylation, epoxidation, ring opening and addition to terminal alkenes. It is a precursor to agent Ph_{3}P=CHCl that can add a chloromethylene group (=CHCl). It reacts with organolithium compounds to give chloromethyl lithium (ClCH_{2}Li).

== Crystallography ==
It crystallizes orthorhombic crystal system with space group Pnma with lattice constants: a = 6.383, b = 6.706, c = 8.867 (.10^{−1} nm).
