= Bromotriiodomethane =

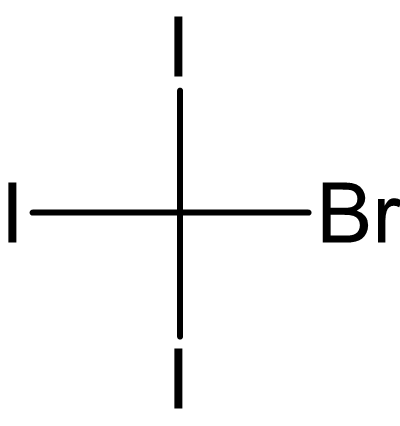

Names
- Preferred IUPAC name Bromo(triiodo)methane

Identifiers
CAS Number	558-16-7
3D model (JSmol)	Interactive image
ChemSpider	11570035
PubChem CID	12542275
CompTox Dashboard (EPA)	DTXSID70501897
- InChI: InChI=1S/CBrI3/c2-1(3,4)5 Key: SVGXPROWWXKVKR-UHFFFAOYSA-N
- SMILES: C(Br)(I)(I)I

Properties
Chemical formula	CBrI_{3}
Molar mass	472.628 g·mol^{−1}
Appearance	Unstable solid
Density	4.1 g/cm³
Boiling point	300.7 °C (573.3 °F; 573.8 K)
Solubility in water	soluble

Hazards
Flash point	135.7 °C

Related compounds
Related compounds	Chlorotriiodomethane; Dibromodiiodomethane; Tetraiodomethane
- Except where otherwise noted, data are given for materials in their standard state (at 25 °C [77 °F], 100 kPa). Infobox references

Bromotriiodomethane is a tetrahalomethane with the chemical formula CBrI_{3}. This is a halomethane containing one bromine atom and three iodine atoms attached to the methane backbone.

== Synthesis ==
Bromotriiodomethane is prepared by the reaction of triiodomethane with sodium hypobromite. It is formed as a trace by-product in the reaction of carbon tetrabromide with sodium iodide in acetone, with bromotriiodomethane being the main product (30%).

== Physical properties ==
Bromotriiodomethane forms an unstable solid that releases iodine upon exposure to light. It is soluble in water.
