= Diradicaloid =

Chemical radical

Biradicaloids or diradicaloids are molecules with two radical electrons that have significant interaction with each other. The two unpaired electrons are coupled and can either form a singlet ground state (antiferromagnetic coupling) or a triplet ground state (ferromagnetic coupling) (Figure 1).

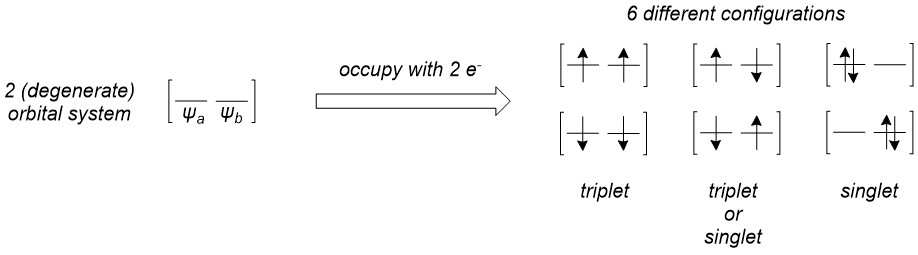
Figure 1. The occupation of 2 orbitals with 2 electrons results in 6 different electronic configurations. These configurations need to be considered to describe the singlet and triplet states of a diradical species.

This is in contrast to "disbiradicals," where the two radical electrons have no significant interaction and act independently as isolated radical species. Diradicals are characterized by their diradical character, commonly quantified using an indicator $\gamma$. In the limit of fully degenerate frontier molecular orbitals, $\gamma$ approaches a value of 1, representing 100% diradical character. However, diradicaloids have a small gap between the highest occupied molecular orbital (HOMO) and the lowest occupied molecular orbital (LUMO) and thus can be described as having incomplete diradical character, generally corresponding to a value of $\gamma$ between 0.20 and 0.80. Diradicals have historically been characterized as transient species describing the transition state of a bond breaking and/or making process, but recently, the introduction of steric strain to prevent bond formation and substitution of carbon atoms with main-group elements have been found to significantly stabilize diradical species, leading to their isolation and structural characterization. However, these modifications decrease diradical character, leading these species to be more properly designated as diradicaloids. Diradicaloids have found applications in small molecule activation, chemical synthesis, molecular switching, nonlinear optics, and spintronics.

== Theoretical description ==
=== Electronic structure ===
Due to the coupling interaction between the radical electrons in a diradical(oid) species, they cannot be simply described as the union of two independent radical centers. Both the open-shell singlet and triplet states must be considered to fully describe the electronic structure of diradical(oid) species.

The triplet state wavefunction $\Psi_{T}$ can be described as a single electronic configuration with a single Slater determinant. However, when the frontier molecular orbitals are degenerate or nearly degenerate, the lowest-energy singlet state wavefunction $\Psi_{S}$ must account for multiple electronic configurations (see electronic correlation). Thus, $\Psi_{S}$ is most accurately represented as a combination of Slater determinants. Here, the configuration interaction (CI) coefficients $c_{1}$ and $c_{2}$ define the contribution of each determinant to the total wavefunction, where $\psi_{H}$ refers to the HOMO and $\psi_{L}$ refers to the LUMO:

$\Psi_{T}=|...\psi_{H} \psi_{L} \rangle$

$\Psi_{S}=c_{1} |...\psi_{H}^{2} \rangle - c_{2} |...\psi_{L}^{2} \rangle$

When $c_{1} = c_{2} = \frac{1}{\sqrt{2}}$, $\psi_{H}$ and $\psi_{L}$ are degenerate, and the singlet wavefunction $\Psi_{S}$ describes a perfect diradical. As the HOMO–LUMO gap increases, the wavefunction approaches that of a classical closed-shell species; $c_{1}$ approaches 1 and $c_{2}$ approaches 0 so that the lowest-energy singlet state is dominated by the doubly occupied HOMO.

To gain a more intuitive understanding of the diradical nature of the wavefunction, the triplet and singlet wavefunctions can be represented using a localized orbital basis, where $\chi_{A}$ and $\chi_{B}$ are the two localized orbitals (Figure 2). Assuming $\chi_{A}$ and $\chi_{B}$ are orthogonal, the overlap integral becomes 0. The HOMO $\psi_{H}$ can be decomposed into the in-phase overlap of $\chi_{A}$ and $\chi_{B}$, while the LUMO $\psi_{L}$ can be decomposed into the out-of-phase overlap of $\chi_{A}$ and $\chi_{B}$:

$\psi_{H} = \frac{1}{\sqrt{2}} (\chi_{A} + \chi_{B})$

$\psi_{L} = \frac{1}{\sqrt{2}} ( \chi_{A} - \chi_{B} )$

Consequently, the singlet wavefunction $\Psi_{S}$ can be expressed as the combination of a covalent contribution $\Psi_{cov}$ and an ionic contribution $\Psi_{ion}$. The covalent component represents the electron configuration in which both localized orbitals are singly occupied; this corresponds to diradical character. The ionic component represents the electron configuration in which one localized orbital is doubly occupied, leaving the other localized orbital empty; this corresponds to zwitterionic character:

$\Psi_{S} = \frac{c_{1} + c_{2}}{\sqrt{2}} \frac{1}{\sqrt{2}} (|... \chi_{A} \chi_{B} \rangle - |... \chi_{B} \chi_{A} \rangle ) + \frac{c_{1} - c_{2}}{\sqrt{2}} \frac{1}{\sqrt{2}} (|... \chi_{A}^{2} \rangle - |... \chi_{B}^{2} \rangle )$

$\Psi_{S} = c_{cov} \Psi_{cov} + c_{ion} \Psi_{ion}$ where $c_{cov} = \frac{c_{1} + c_{2}}{\sqrt{2}}$ and $c_{ion} = \frac{c_{1} - c_{2}}{\sqrt{2}}$

When $c_{1} = c_{2} = \frac{1}{\sqrt{2}}$, $c_{cov} = 1$ and $c_{ion} = 0$; thus, this situation describes 100% diradical character. As the HOMO-LUMO gap increases, $c_{1}$ approaches 1 and $c_{2}$ approaches 0, which results in $c_{cov} = c_{ion}$; thus, this situation reduces to the complete delocalization of the electrons over the two-orbital system, which is equivalent to the electron configuration of the closed-shell species.

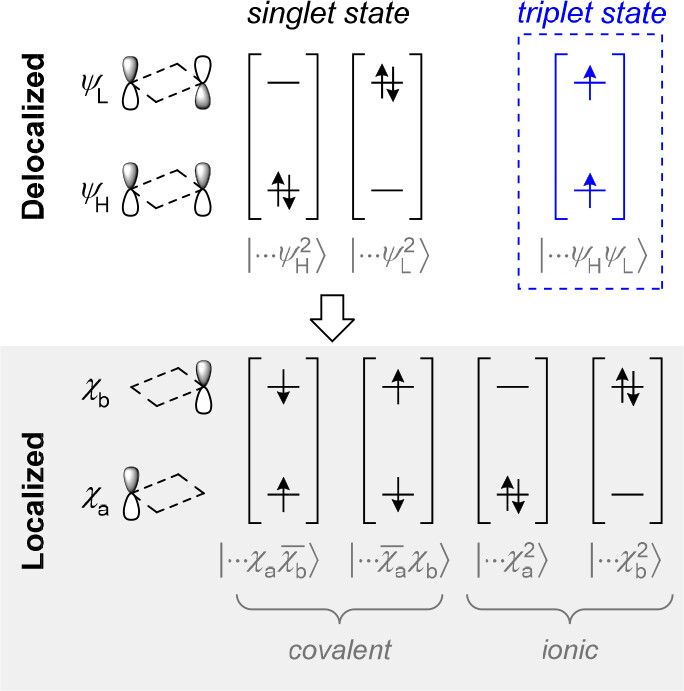
Figure 2. Change of basis from delocalized molecular orbital basis to localized atomic orbital basis. Reprinted with permission from Chem. Rev. 2023, 123, 16, 10468–10526. Copyright 2023 American Chemical Society.

=== Indicators of diradical character ===
The CI coefficients $c_{1}$ and $c_{2}$ can be used to provide a quantification of diradical character. Some common indicators are listed below:

$\gamma = \sqrt{2} c_{2} = c_{cov} - c_{ion}$

$d = 2 c_{1} c_{2} = c_{cov}^{2} - c_{ion}^{2}$

$\beta = 2 c_{2}^{2} = (c_{cov} - c_{ion} )^{2}$

All of the above indicators ($\gamma , d , \beta$) effectively describe how much greater the relative weight of the covalent contribution is to the singlet wavefunction $\Psi_{S}$ compared to the ionic contribution. Thus, the greater the values of these indicators, the greater the diradical character. In the limit of 100% diradical character, these indicators approach a value of 1; in the limit of 100% classical closed-shell character, these indicators approach a value of 0.

Natural orbital (NO) occupation numbers are also another theoretical indicator of diradical character. The occupancy of the lowest unoccupied NO is equal to the $\beta$ indicator and ranges from 0 to 1; the closer the calculated occupancy is to 1, the greater the predicted diradical character. On the other hand, the occupancy of the highest occupied NO ranges from 1 to 2; the closer the calculated occupancy is to 1, the greater the predicted diradical character. These natural orbital occupancy numbers can be calculated using almost all computational methods and therefore can often be obtained with less computational cost than calculating $\beta$ using CI methods.

A small singlet-triplet energy gap can also indicate increased diradical character. Lastly, if the calculated A-B distance (where A and B are the two radical centers) is elongated compared to the sum of the covalent radii (the typical A-B distance of a closed-shell molecule) but is shorter than the sum of the van der Waals radii, this may also suggest the presence of a diradicaloid. Incorporating sterically bulky substituents and introducing ring strain in heterocycles can help to prevent bond formation and/or generate elongated bonds.

== Synthesis ==
=== Cyclobutane-1,3-diyl analogues ===
==== Cyclobutane-1,3-diyl ====
Cyclobutane-1,3-diyl is the planar four-membered carbon ring species with radical character localized at the 1 and 3 positions. The singlet cyclobutane-1,3-diyl is predicted to be the transition state for the ring inversion of bicyclobutane, proceeding via homolytic cleavage of the transannular carbon-carbon bond (Figure 3).

Figure 3. The ring inversion of bicyclobutane is proposed to involve a biradical transition state in which the transannular C-C bond is broken.

A 1,3-dimethyl substituted derivative in the triplet state was detected by electron paramagnetic resonance spectroscopy; the diradical species was generated via irradiation of the precursor diazo compound below 25 K in a solid matrix (Figure 4). However, the all-carbon cyclobutane-1,3-diyl is very short-lived and quickly reacts to form the bicyclobutane isomer.

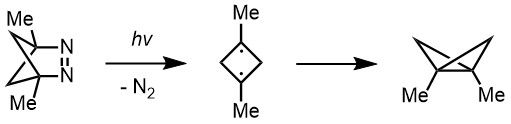
Figure 4. Generation of a longer-lived cyclobutane-1,3-diyl species through N2 extrusion.

==== 1,3-diphospha-cyclobutane-2,4-diyl ====
In 1995, Niecke and coworkers reported the first synthesis of a phosphorus analog of cyclobutane-1,3-diyl, [ClC(μ-PMes*)]_{2}. This species consists of a [P_{2}C_{2}]-four-membered heterocycle with radical character centered on the two carbon atoms. The heterocycle was synthesized from the reaction of aryl(dichloromethylene)phosphene (aryl = Mes*, supermesityl) with n-butyllithium in a 2:1 ratio, followed by elimination of LiCl (Figure 5). X-ray diffraction revealed that the [P_{2}C_{2}] unit exists in the planar four-membered ring form, rather than as the bicyclic isomer. MCSCF calculations predicted a singlet ground state. In addition, the calculated CI wavefunction has contributions from both the doubly occupied HOMO state and the doubly occupied LUMO state; this corresponded to occupation of the HOMO with 1.6 electrons, indicating considerable diradical character. The diphosphacyclobutane heterocycle is thermally stable, and transannular C-C bond formation is thermally forbidden according to the Woodward-Hoffmann rules. Heating at 100 °C in toluene led to the cleavage of the P-C bond, likely generating a ring-opened carbene intermediate that subsequently performed intramolecular C-H activation.

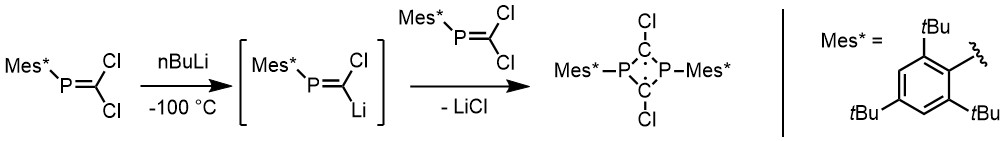
Figure 5. Synthetic route towards [ClC(μ-PMes*)]2 developed by Niecke et al.

Another synthetic route was developed by Yoshifuji and Ito to access a wider variety of substituents at phosphorus (Figure 7). 2 equivalents of Mes*-substituted phosphaalkyne can be reacted with the lithiated compound of the first substituent on phosphorus, forming the anionic [P_{2}C_{2}] four-membered ring. This intermediate can then be alkylated to attach the second phosphorus substituent. This two-step synthetic pathway allows for the synthesis of unsymmetrically substituted 1,3-diphospha-cyclobutane-2,4-diyls. The substituents on carbon are limited to Mes*, however, due to the limitation of the phosphaalkyne starting material. Most diradicaloids of this type can be handled in air and display high kinetic stability due to the steric protection provided by the Mes* substituents on the carbon radical centers.

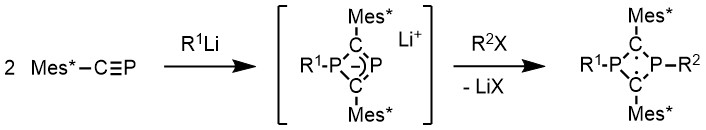
Figure 7. Alternative synthetic route towards 1,3-diphospha-cyclobutane-2,4-diyl compounds developed by Yoshifuji and Ito et al.

==== 1,3-diaza-2,4-dipnicta-cyclobutane-2,4-diyl ====
These diradical species consist of a [Pn_{1}(μ-NR)_{2}Pn_{2}] heterocyclic core (Pn = pnictogen) where the radical sites are centered on the pnictogen atoms. The presence of a nitrogen atom in the heterocycle is thought to stabilize the planar form relative to the bicyclic isomer. This is believed to result from the inability of Pn-Pn bond formation in the bicyclobutane form to energetically compensate for the increase in Pn-N-Pn angle strain; consequently, the planar form, which allows for larger Pn-N-Pn angles, is more stable. The lack of electron delocalization found in calculations suggests that aromaticity from the presence of 6π electrons does not play a significant role in stabilization of the planar isomers.

In 2011, Schulz and coworkers synthesized the first example of a [P_{2}N_{2}] four-membered ring diradicaloid (here, Pn = phosphorus) with meta-terphenyl and hypersilyl substituents on the nitrogen atoms. The synthetic route begins with the chlorinated P_{2}N_{2} heterocycle, which is then reduced to the diradicaloid with relatively mild titanium(II) or titanium(III) reducing agents (Figure 8). The bulky terphenyl and hypersilyl groups provide kinetic stabilization, preventing dimerization. The terphenyl-substituted diradicaloid is almost indefinitely stable under argon atmosphere at ambient temperatures as a solid and in solvent. The crystal structure reveals a planar [P_{2}N_{2}] four-membered ring and a long distance between the two phosphorus atoms (2.6186 Å compared to 2.22 Å, the sum of covalent radii), indicating no significant transannular interactions. Computations also support the diradical character of this species and predict a singlet ground state. The calculated CI wavefunction has contributions from both the doubly occupied HOMO state and the doubly occupied LUMO state; this corresponds to occupation of the HOMO with 1.7 electrons, indicating considerable diradical character.

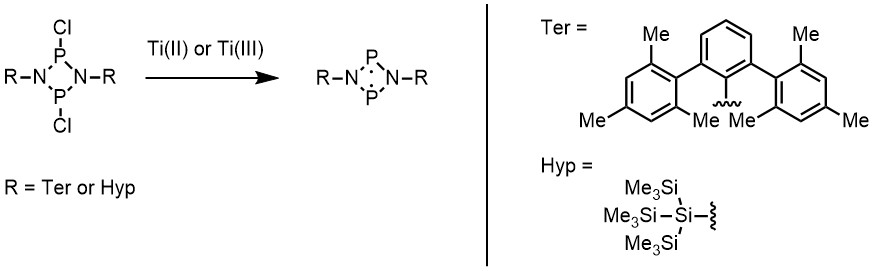
Figure 8. Synthetic route towards a [P2N2] diradicaloid developed by Schulz et al.

Using a similar synthetic route, the arsenic analogue was also synthesized from the chlorinated precursor; reduction using magnesium metal generated the arsenic centered diradicaloid. The crystal structure confirmed a long As-As distance, and EPR spectroscopy indicated a singlet ground state. A mixed phosphorus-arsenic diradicaloid was also reported in 2015, the first with different radical centers. The crystal structure revealed a kite-shaped planar four membered ring with a transannular As-P distance of 2.790 Å, which is shorter than the sum of van der Waals radii (3.65 Å) but longer than the sum of covalent radii (2.32 Å).

Heavier derivatives (where Pn = antimony and bismuth) were observed in situ but could not be isolated due to rapid decomposition to the allyl analogues in the presence of magnesium; however, the corresponding diradicaloids could be trapped through [2+2] cycloadditions with alkynes, thereby providing evidence for their existence. Calculations suggest that the antimony and bismuth-centered diradicaloids have higher diradical character than the lighter pnictogen analogues due to the singlet-triplet energy gap decreasing with heavier, larger pnictogens.

==== Other hetero-cyclobutane-1,3-diyls ====
In 2002, Bertrand and coworkers synthesized the first 1,3-diphospha-2,4-dibora-cyclobutane-2,4-diyl, in which the diradical character is localized on the boron atoms. In 2009, Schnöckel and coworkers reported the synthesis of a heavier aluminum-centered diradical analog. A silicon-centered diradical (1,3-diaza-2,4-disilacyclobutane-2,4-diyl) is also known, synthesized by Sekiguchi and coworkers in 2011. An analog in which the nitrogen atoms are replaced with carbon, as well as an all-silicon cyclobutane-1,3-diyl, have been synthesized. In 2004, Power and coworkers reported the synthesis of a germanium-centered diradical, the heavier analog of Sekiguchi's silicon diradical. The corresponding tin-centered diradicals have also been synthesized by Lappert and coworkers in 2004. In 2017, N-heterocyclic carbene-stabilized phosphorus-centered diradicals were reported; like the Niecke-type diradicaloid, the core heterocycle is a [P_{2}C_{2}] four-membered ring, but the radical centers are located on phosphorus rather than carbon. Lastly, one of the first hetero-cyclobutanediyl derivates synthesized is N_{2}S_{2}, disulfur dinitride, but its diradical character has been widely discussed in the literature and is still disputed today.

=== Cyclopentane-1,3-diyl analogues ===
==== Cyclopentane-1,3-diyl ====
Cyclopentane-1,3-diyl is the planar five-membered carbon ring species with radical character localized at the 1 and 3 positions. The triplet diradical was detected by EPR spectroscopy; the diradical species was generated via irradiation of the precursor diazo compound at 5.5 K in a solid matrix (Figure 11). Due to its very short lifetime, all-carbon cyclopentane-1,3-diyl cannot be isolated, but heating cyclopentane-1,3-diyl leads to the formation of a transannular C-C bond, producing the housane isomer. While the triplet state is predicted to be an energy minimum, the singlet state is predicted to be the transition state for housane inversion.

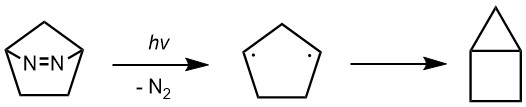
Figure 11. Generation of cyclopentane-1,3-diyl through N2 extrusion.

==== Hetero-cyclopentane-1,3-diyls ====
Five-membered diradicals with radical character localized on pnictogen atoms can be synthesized via the insertion of carbon monoxide and isonitriles into the corresponding pnictogen-centered cyclobutane-1,3-diyls. In 2015, Schulz and coworkers reported the first stable cyclopentane-1,3-diyl species generated from the ring expansion of terphenyl-substituted diphosphadiazanediyl using carbon monoxide (Figure 12). The computed structural data support an almost planar five-membered ring, and the HOMO/LUMO contributions to the CI wavefunction indicate an occupation of the HOMO with 1.44 electrons, suggesting diradical character. Experimentally, additions of phosphaalkyne and elemental sulfur across the phosphorus atom are consistent with diradicaloid reactivity.

Figure 12. CO insertion generates hetero-cyclopentane-1,3-diyl, reported by Schulz et al.

Isonitriles can also insert into the same diphosphadiazanediyls to form the corresponding heterocyclic 5-membered diradicaloids (Figure 13a). The insertion reaction is sensitive to the steric bulk of the substituent on the isonitrile; for example, the terphenyl-substituted isonitrile was unable to undergo the insertion reaction, while the smaller 2,6-dimethylphenyl isonitrile was able to insert into the P-N bond.

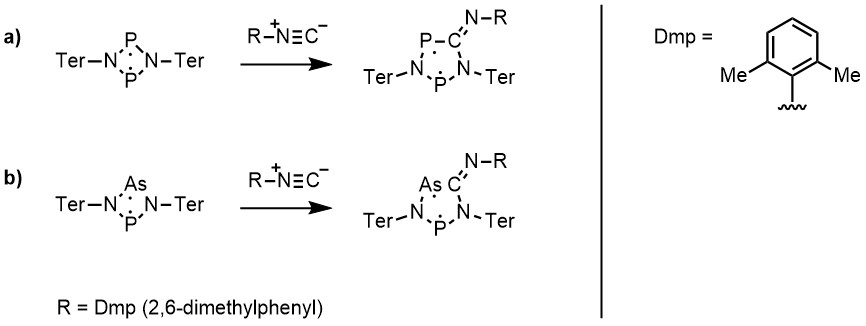
Figure 13. RNC (isonitrile) insertion into (a) [P2N2] and (b) [PAsN2] diradicaloids, reported by Schulz et al.

Isonitrile insertion was also explored with mixed phosphorus-nitrogen and phosphorus-arsenic centered 4-membered ring diradicaloids. With the latter compound, the isonitrile selectively inserts into the arsenic-nitrogen bond over the phosphorus-nitrogen bond (Figure 13b). The resulting five-membered ring species was characterized via X-ray structural analysis, confirming the above connectivity (Figure 14). Calculations revealed a substantial diradical character ($\beta$=0.24), which agrees with the experimentally observed activation of triple bonds.

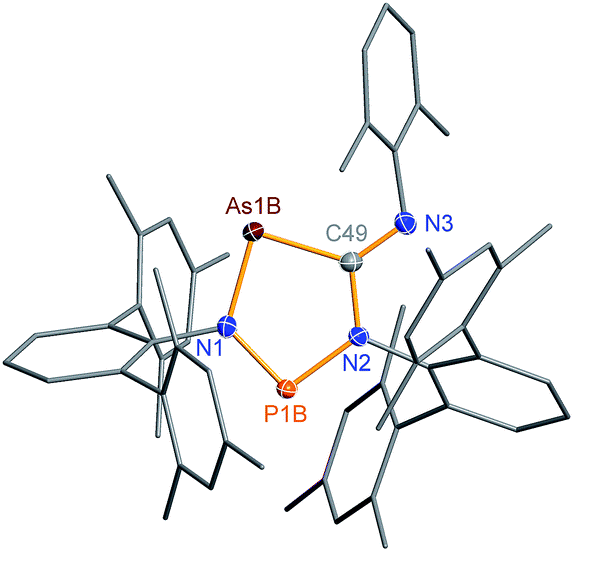
Figure 14. Crystal structure of hetero-cyclopentanediyl diradicaloid resulting from isonitrile insertion into [PAsN2] diradicaloid.

=== Other main group diradicaloids ===
Diradicaloid 6-membered heterocycles have been reported. In 2020, a cyclic alkylaminocarbene-stabilized 9,10-diboraanthracene was synthesized. EPR spectroscopy and quantum calculations indicated a singlet diradical ground state, and the incorporation of boron atoms was demonstrated to lower the HOMO-LUMO energy gap. In 2021, a cyclic germanium-centered diradicaloid with a [C_{4}Ge_{2}] framework was isolated. Calculations indicated a singlet diradical ground state, and the ability of the germanium species to split dihydrogen at room temperature further supported its diradical character.

A 1,2-diborete diradicaloid containing a highly strained [B_{2}C_{2}] framework was reported by Braunschweig and coworkers in 2022. In 2024, the first diborepin diradicals, in which the boron radical sites are disjointed, were synthesized by Gilliard and coworkers.

== Reactivity ==
Diradicaloids, depending on the reaction conditions and extent of diradical character, can display both closed-shell and open-shell reactivity. Closed-shell reactivity (e.g., pericyclic reactions) is best understood using the delocalized molecular orbital picture, while open-shell reactivity (e.g., radical additions) is best understood using the localized atomic orbital picture.

=== Closed-shell reactivity ===
For example, the phosphorus-centered diradicaloid [P(μ-NTer)_{2}]_{2} can undergo concerted pericyclic reactions with single bonds (H_{2}), double bonds (alkenes, aldehydes), and triple bonds (alkynes, nitriles) (Figure 15). Only the cis-addition products are observed, which is consistent with a concerted mechanism.

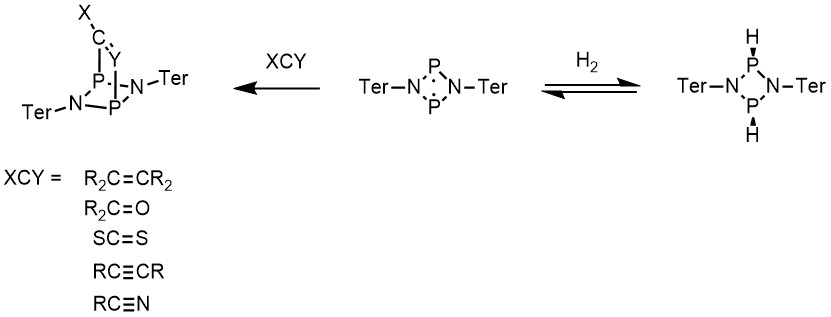
Figure 15. Examples of closed-shell reactivity of [P(μ-NTer)2]2.

From a molecular orbital perspective, the formation of new bonds at phosphorus occurs through the interaction of the antibonding HOMO of the diradicaloid with the antibonding LUMO of the reacting partner or the interaction of the bonding LUMO of the diradicaloid with the bonding HOMO of the reacting partner, both of which are symmetry-allowed.

Interestingly, H_{2} addition is reversible; below 50 °C, H_{2} addition is observed, and above 60 °C, H_{2} release occurs to regenerate the original diradicaloid species.

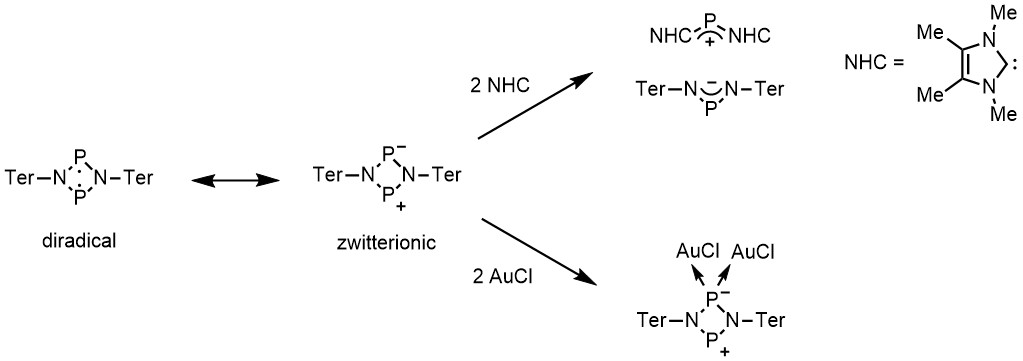
Figure 17. Reactivity of the zwitterionic form of [P(μ-NTer)2]2 with Lewis bases and Lewis acids.

Diradicaloids can also react as nucleophiles or electrophiles from their zwitterionic resonance forms. For example, [P(μ-NTer)_{2}]_{2} has been shown to react with both Lewis basic N-heterocyclic carbenes as well as Lewis acidic gold(I) chloride (Figure 17).

=== Open-shell reactivity ===
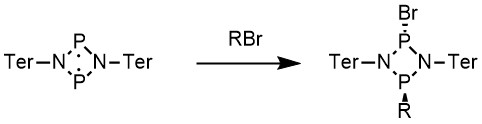
Figure 18. Example of open-shell reactivity of [P(μ-NTer)2]2.

For example, the phosphorus-centered diradicaloid [P(μ-NTer)_{2}]_{2} can undergo stepwise radical addition reactions with alkyl bromides (Figure 18). The trans-addition products were exclusively formed, which is consistent with a stepwise radical abstraction followed by radical recombination mechanism.

In 2025, Neil Garg, Kendall Houk, and coworkers reported reactions of two strained diradicaloids: cyclic allenes and bicyclobutanes. The study introduced diradicaloids to the field of organic synthesis.

== Applications ==
Hetero-cyclopentane-1,3-diyls have been shown to display molecular switching behavior; this property relies on the ability to use external stimuli to switch a molecule between two different stable states, thereby allowing for easy modulation of special reactivity and/or other properties. Diradicaloids can serve as molecular switches if certain external stimuli can reversibly toggle between the planar isomer, which displays diradical character and corresponding reactivity, and the bicyclic housane isomer, which is a closed shell species.

For example, the concept of switchable diradicals was demonstrated using the hetero-cyclopentane-1,3-diyl with phosphorus-phosphorus centered radicals (Figure 19). Upon exposure to red light, the planar five-membered ring diradical isomerizes to the bicyclic housane species. After irradiation, the thermally induced reverse reaction occurs, breaking the transannular bond to regenerate the planar diradicaloid species. Thus, the activation chemistry of the diradical can be switched "off" via irradiation and can be switched back "on" via stopping irradiation. This switching could be repeated several times without degradation of the diradicaloid.

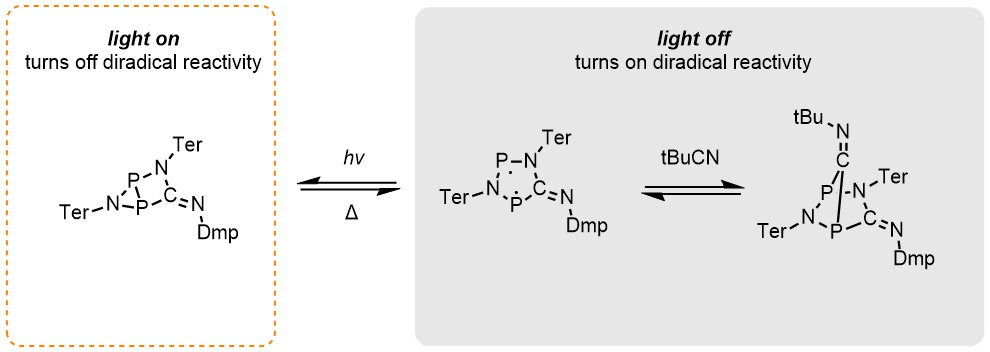
Figure 19. A phosphorus-centered cyclopentane-1,3-diyl diradicaloid demonstrates molecular switching behavior. Exposure to red light generates the bicyclic closed-shell species, turning "off" isonitrile insertion reactivity.
