= Diphosphadiboretanes =

Diphosphadiboretane
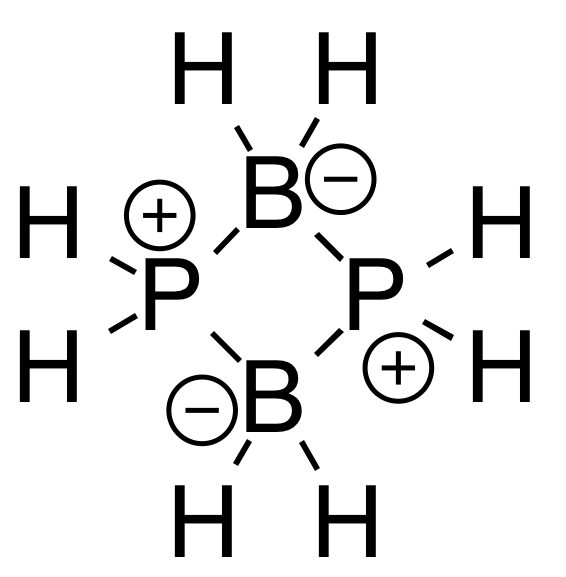

Names
- IUPAC name 1,3-diphosphonia-2,4-diboranuidacyclobutane

Identifiers
3D model (JSmol)	Interactive image
PubChem CID	101251785
- InChI: InChI=1S/B2H8P2/c1-3-2-4-1/h1-4H2 Key: SVSGFPJVCAXIEE-UHFFFAOYSA-N
- SMILES: [BH2-]1[PH2+][BH2-][PH2+]1

Properties
Chemical formula	B_{2}H_{8}P_{2}
Molar mass	91.63 g·mol^{−1}
- Except where otherwise noted, data are given for materials in their standard state (at 25 °C [77 °F], 100 kPa). Infobox references

1,3-Diphospha-2,4-diboretanes, or B_{2}P_{2}, is a class of 4-member cyclic compounds of alternating boron and phosphorus atoms. They are often found as dimers during the synthesis of boraphosphenes (RB=PR'). Compounds can exhibit localized singlet diradical character (diradicaloid) between the boron atoms in the solution and solid state.

== Synthesis ==
The first suggested synthesis of a diphosphadiboretane compound was with phosphinoarylboranes dimerization in 1961. Concurrently, a diphosphadiboretane was determined to be produced from the reaction with phosphinosilanes and boron halides. The following thermolysis treatment formed boraphosphenes by cleavage of the σ P-Si bonds. Dimerization of these compounds are highly favored (upward to 90 kcal mol^{−1}), which results in isolated diphosphadiboretanes. Alternative routes of synthesis utilizing facile leaving groups have also been discovered including hydrogen halide and organylphosphane elimination to obtain the monomer precursors. Treatment with boron halides with lithium phosphides have also been found to lead to monomers which then dimerize into the diphosphadiboretanes.

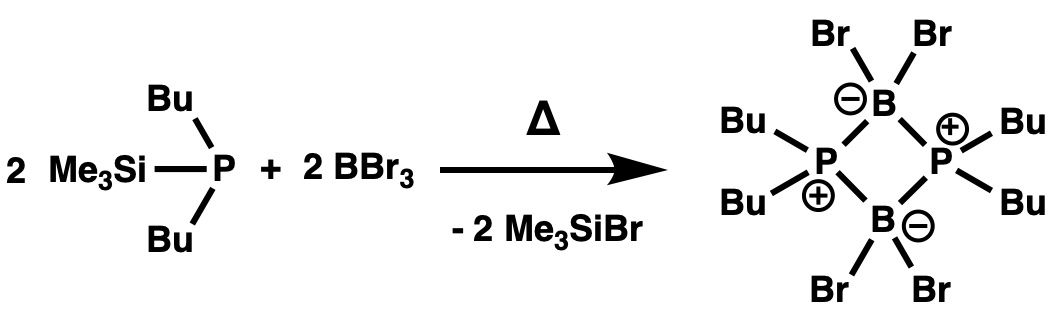
Thermolysis of facile silyl halide leaving group forms boraphosphane from silylphosphine and tribromobromide. Boraphosphane dimerizes, leaving diphosphadiboretane.

In 2002, a direct synthesis to a diphosphadiboretanediyl, a diphosphadiboretane derivative, was accomplished using 1,2-dichlorodiborane and a lithium phosphide reagent.

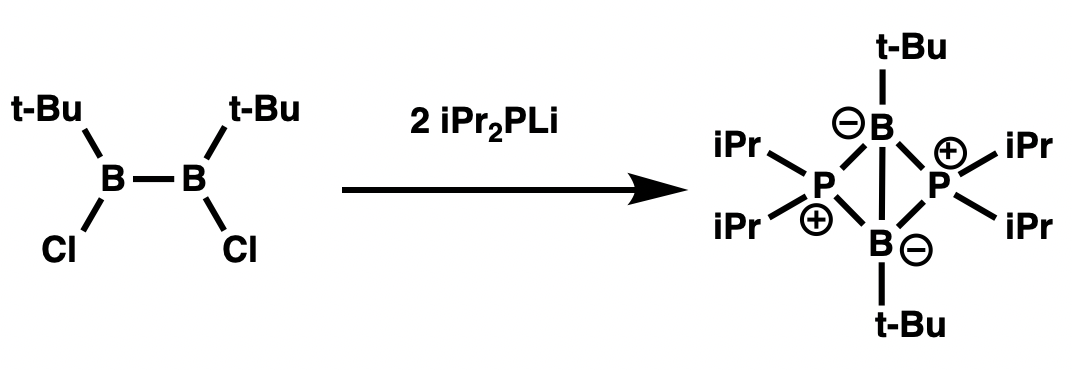
Formation of singlet diradical diphosphaboretanediyl using 1,2-dichloro-1,2-di(tert-butyl)diborane with lithium diisopropylphosphide reagent.

In 2021, it was found that the phosphination of diboryne using diphosphate would slowly convert to diphosphadiboretane in solution.

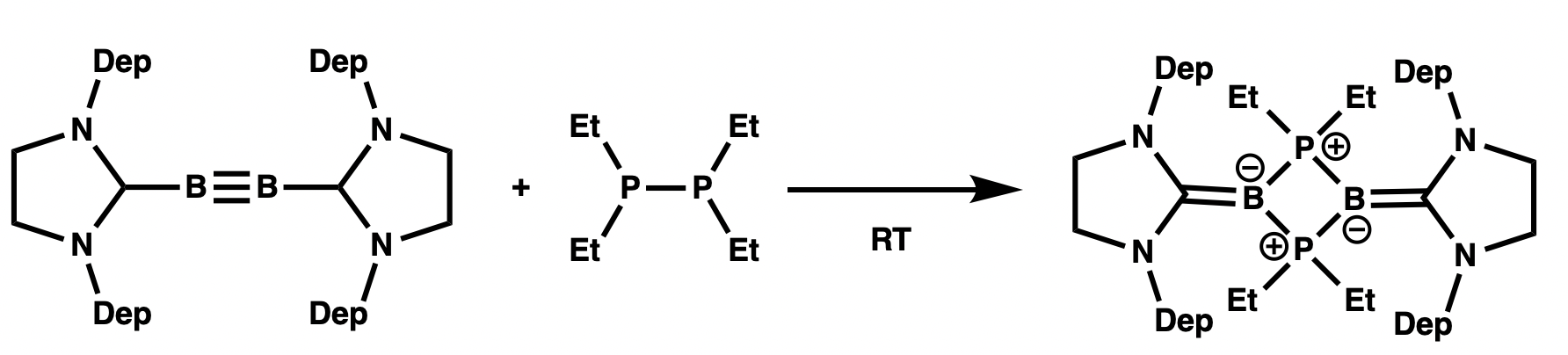
Synthesis of diphosphadiboretane using reactive diboryne precursor with tetraethyldiphosphine (Dep = 2,6-diethyl phenyl).

== Structure and bonding ==
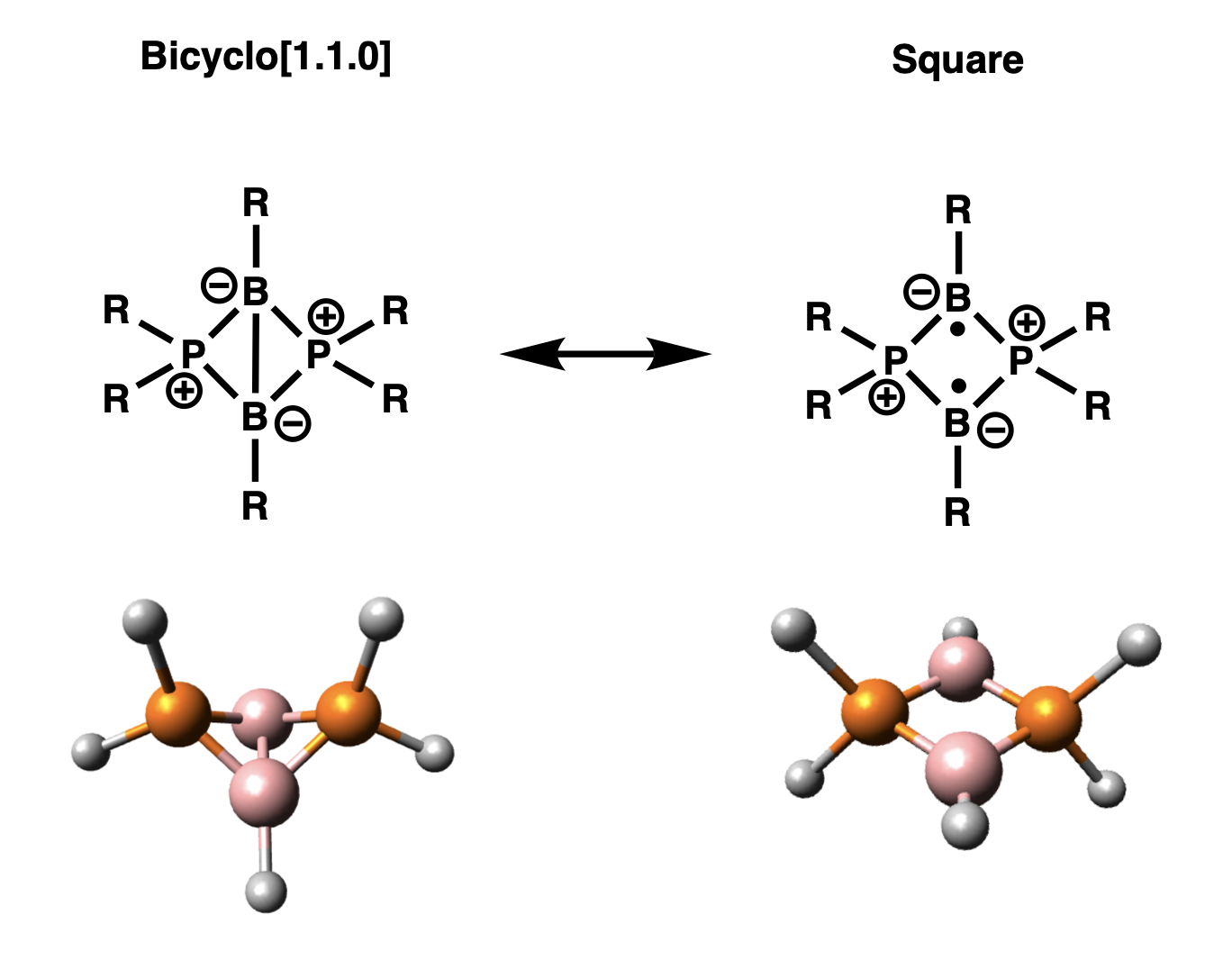
Structural range of diphosphadiboretanediyl (phosphorus = orange; boron = pink, R = white).

=== X-ray crystallography ===
Diphosphadiboretanes can be isolated as single crystals suitable for x-ray crystallography. The structure is found to be planar, with a near-square geometry. The B-B distance is found to be ranging from 2.57-2.71 Å, indicating a long B-B single bond. The phosphorus atoms adopt pyramidal geometries, which are preferred over a planar geometry and prevents π-bonding with the boron atoms.

==== Planar and bicyclic structure ====
The diphosphadiboretanediyl derivatives have a wider structural range, adopting planar and bicyclo[1.1.0] geometries, similar to diphosphacylobutanediyls. These geometries can be modulated by changing the substituents on the boron or phosphorus atoms. This conversion is accompanied by lengthening and shortening of the B-B bond, respectively. Addition of more steric, protecting groups on the boron atoms and less steric groups on the phosphorus atoms favor the bicyclo[1.1.0] structure. The latter is due to reduction of 1,3-diaxial strain. Coplanar π-bonding to the boron atom and addition of aromatic groups to the ring favors the bicyclo[1.1.0] structure with a B-B bond length shorten down to 1.83 Å.

=== Diradical ===
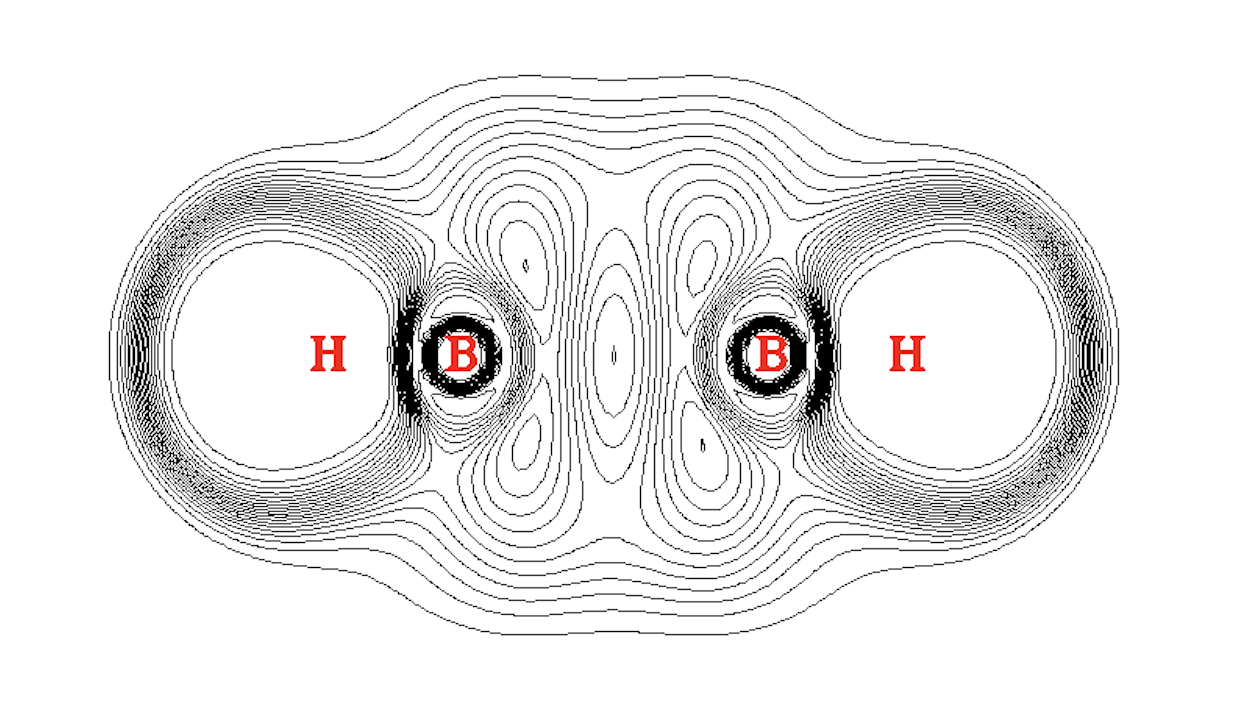
2D contour plot of electron localization function of hydrogen-substituted diphosphadiboretanediyl. Displayed plane contains both B-H bonds and is perpendicular to plane of B_{2}P_{2} ring. Contour lines between B atoms indicates through-space interactions.

In the planar, diphosphadiboretanediyl structures, the substantially long B-B bond can be considered to experience homolytic cleavage to form a localized singlet diradicaloid between the boron atoms. The singlet state energy can be up to 20-35 kcal mol^{−1} more stabilized than the triplet state. Addition of π-donors on the boron atom is found to increase the singlet-triplet gap, while π-acceptors decrease it. The bicyclo[1.1.0] structure, with a shorter B-B bond, is considered to have less diradical character and more of a closed-shell system.

==== Frontier orbitals ====
The HOMO of these diphosphadiboretanediyls consists of a π-orbital with strong boron p-orbital character. This orbital is stabilized by the presence of π-overlap between the trans-boron atoms (through-space interactions) as well as through-bond contributions by the σ* P-R orbitals. Due to the presence of the through-space interaction, computational studies have determined these compounds to have significantly less diradical character than traditional organic diradicals. The LUMO is the antibonding π* B-B orbital.

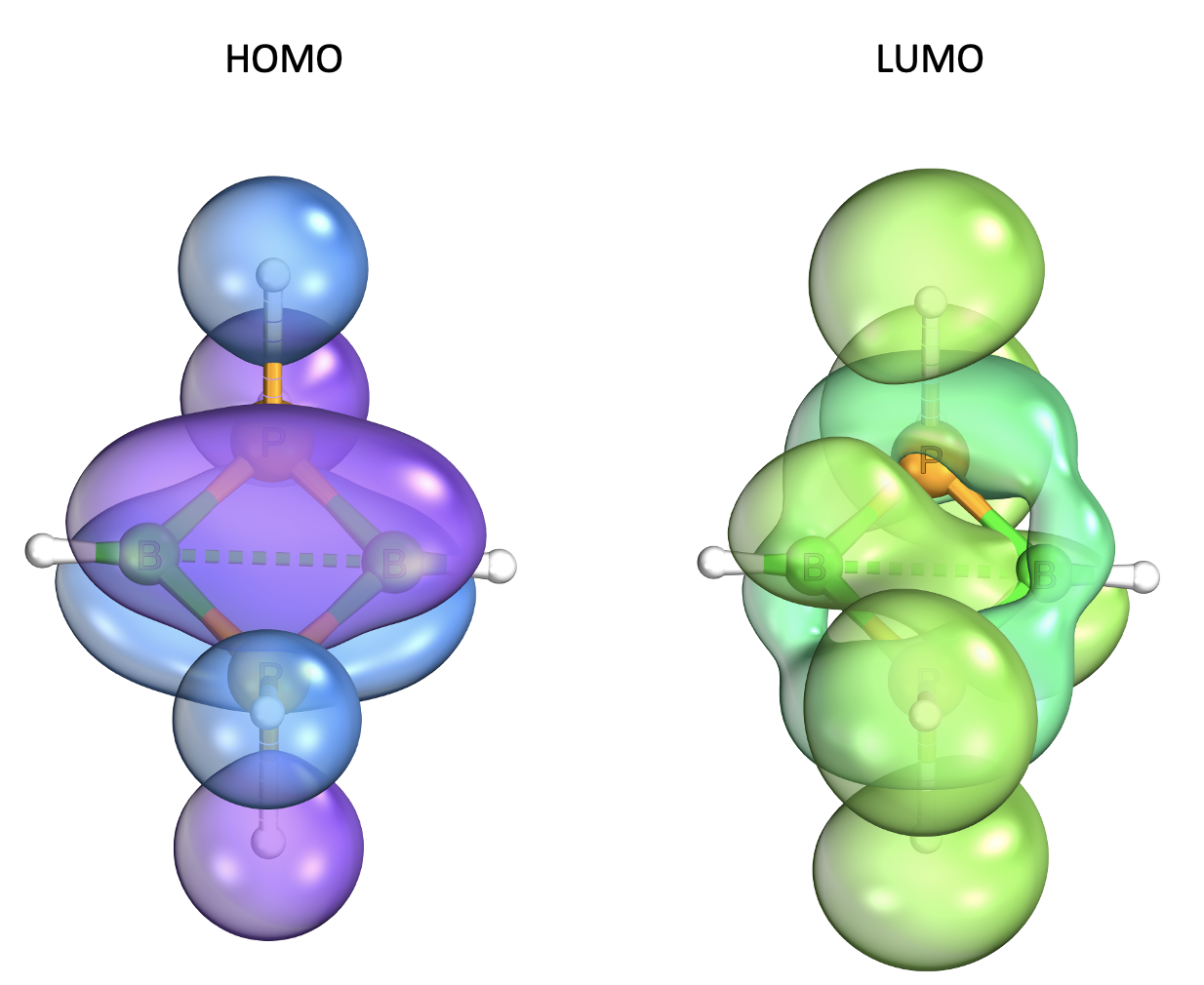
Frontier orbitals of hydrogen-substituted diphosphadiboretanediyl compound in square/diradical geometry.

== Reactivity ==
=== Transition metals ===
Diphosphadiboretanes have been shown to behave as ligands to metal-carbonyl complexes, forming boron-mononuclear, boron-binuclear, η^{3}, and η^{4} architectures with displacement of CO ligands. If steric, amino-containing substituents on the boron are used, then a cycloreversion reaction happens. This results in the production of metal-stabilized boraphosphene. Cage compounds (B_{2}P_{2}M, M = Pd, Pt) have also been reported with η^{2} coordination to the P atoms.

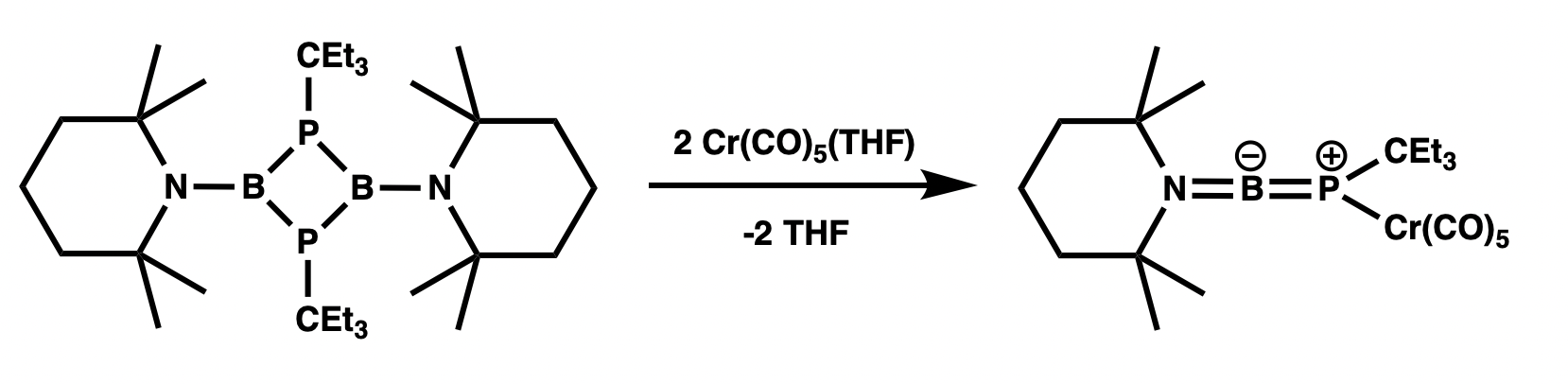
Coordination of diphosphadiboretanetetradyl derivative by chromium(0) pentacarbonyl tetrahydrofuran results in the cycloreversion of the dimer to boraphosphene, stabilized by mono-coordination to the phosphorus atom.

=== Oxidation ===
Synthesis of diphosphadiboretane from diboryne offers a two electron-rich compound, compared to diphosphadiboretanediyls. These electrons can be readily oxidized, affording the radical cation compound and diphsophadiboretanediyl compound. The radical cation is found to exhibit triplet state by electronic paramagnetic resonance, accompanying with a shortening of the B-B bond (2.63 Å) and slight perturbance of planar, square structure. The diphosphadiboretanediyl compound is found to have a B-B bond of 2.12 Å and the transition to the bicyclo[1.1.0] structure. Natural bond orbital analysis of phosphadiboretanediyl compound indicates a bent B-B bond with a small 3 kcal mol^{−1} stabilization energy compared to the planar structure.

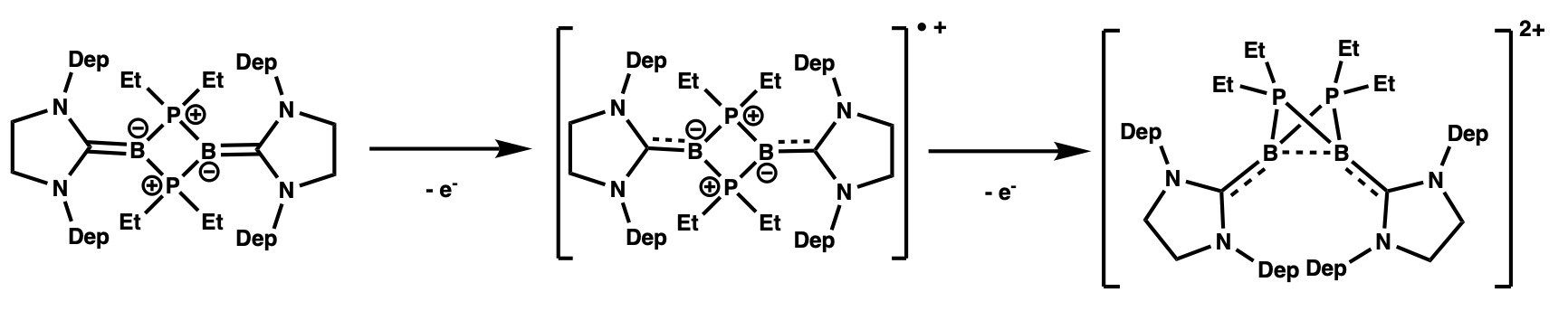
One and two electron oxidation of diphosphadiboretane synthesized from diboryne offers radical cation and dication species. The dication exhibits a butterfly-type structure (Dep = 2,6-diethyl phenyl).

=== Diradical activity ===
Diphosphadiboretanediyls exhibits reactivity similar to radicals, behaving as diradical intermediates. The compounds have been shown to perform chloride abstraction from deuterated chloroform, trans-addition of trimethyl tin hydride, and formation of bicyclo[1.1.1] structure with selenium. Reactivity is displayed towards bromotrichloromethane where radical activity induces formation of boron-containing spiro-compound from the tert-butyl group. This cyclic formation maintains the diphosphadiboretane ring structure.

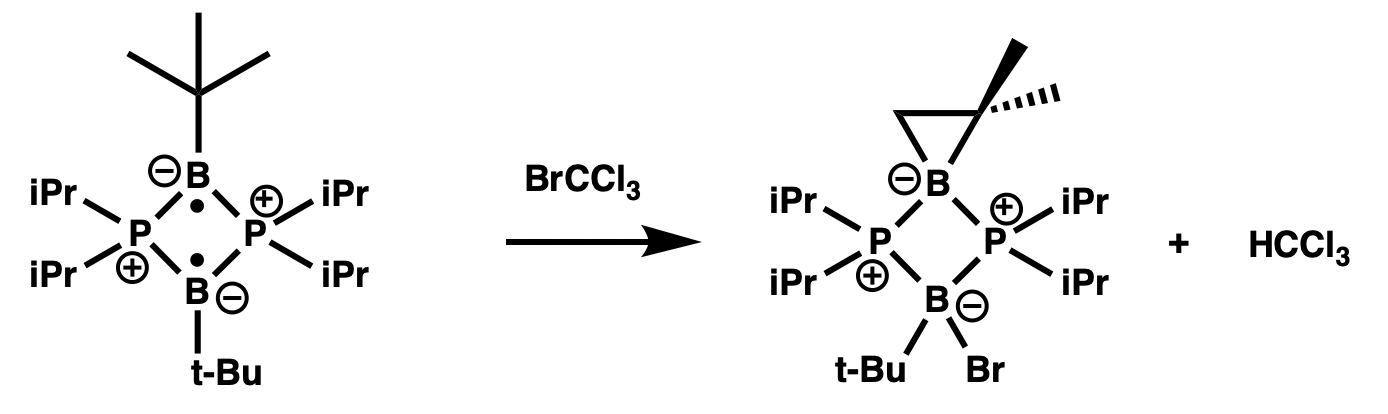
Reaction between di(diisopropylphospha)-di(tert-butyl)boretanediyl with bromotrichloromethane leads to bromine atom addition on a boron atom, boron spiro-complex formation, and trichloromethane byproduct.
