= Diradical =

Chemical species with two electrons occupying degenerate molecular orbitals

In chemistry, a diradical is a molecular species with two electrons occupying molecular orbitals (MOs) which are degenerate. The term "diradical" is mainly used to describe organic compounds, where most diradicals are extremely reactive and non-Kekulé molecules that are rarely isolated. Diradicals are even-electron molecules but have one fewer bond than the number permitted by the octet rule.

Examples of diradical species can also be found in coordination chemistry, for example among bis(1,2-dithiolene) metal complexes.

== Spin states ==
Diradicals are usually triplets. The phrases singlet and triplet are derived from the multiplicity of states of diradicals in electron spin resonance: a singlet diradical has one state (S=0, M_{s}=2*0+1=1, m_{s}=0) and exhibits no signal in EPR and a triplet diradical has 3 states (S=1, M_{s}=2*1+1=3, m_{s}=-1; 0; 1) and shows in EPR 2 peaks (if no hyperfine splitting). The triplet state has total spin quantum number S=1 and is paramagnetic. Therefore, diradical species display a triplet state when the two electrons are unpaired and display the same spin. When the unpaired electrons with opposite spin are antiferromagnetically coupled, diradical species can display a singlet state (S=0) and be diamagnetic.

== Examples ==
Stable, isolable, diradicals include singlet oxygen and triplet oxygen. Other important diradicals are certain carbenes, nitrenes, and their main-group elemental analogues. Lesser-known diradicals are nitrenium ions, carbon chains, and organic so-called non-Kekulé molecules in which the electrons reside on different carbon atoms. N-heterocyclic-carbene derived singlet diradicals have been used for solution-phase singlet fission via self-assembly. Some isolable Kekulé diradicals are stable on air and room-temperature luminescent with large Stokes-shifts and solvatochromism. Main-group cyclic structures can also exhibit diradicals, such as disulfur dinitride, or diradical character, such as diphosphadiboretanes. In inorganic chemistry, both homoleptic and heteroleptic 1,2-dithiolene complexes of d^{8} transition metal ions show a large degree of diradical character in the ground state.

Diradicals in which the unpaired electrons nevertheless interact are sometimes referred to as diradicaloids.
