= Bromochlorodiiodomethane =

Names
- Preferred IUPAC name Bromo(chloro)diiodomethane
- Other names Bromo-chloro-diiodomethane

Identifiers
CAS Number	40809-94-7
3D model (JSmol)	Interactive image
ChemSpider	24590922
PubChem CID	15682861
CompTox Dashboard (EPA)	DTXSID40576810
- InChI: InChI=1S/CBrClI2/c2-1(3,4)5 Key: SBKPKCYHQGLLHE-UHFFFAOYSA-N
- SMILES: C(Cl)(Br)(I)I

Properties
Chemical formula	CBrClI_{2}
Molar mass	381.17 g·mol^{−1}
Density	3.6 g/cm^{3}

Hazards
Flash point	60.6 °C

Related compounds
Related compounds	Bromochloroiodomethane; Bromodichloroiodomethane; Dibromochloroiodomethane; Bromofluoroiodomethane; Dibromofluoroiodomethane; Chlorofluoroiodomethane; Chlorodifluoroiodomethane; Chlorofluorodiiodomethane
- Except where otherwise noted, data are given for materials in their standard state (at 25 °C [77 °F], 100 kPa). Infobox references

Bromochlorodiiodomethane is a tetrahalomethane with the chemical formula CBrClI_{2}. This is an organic compound containing two iodine atoms, one bromine atom, and one chlorine atom attached to the methane backbone. Some sources report this compound as still hypothetical.
