= 2-Chloroethanol =

- Skeletal formula of 2-chloroethanol

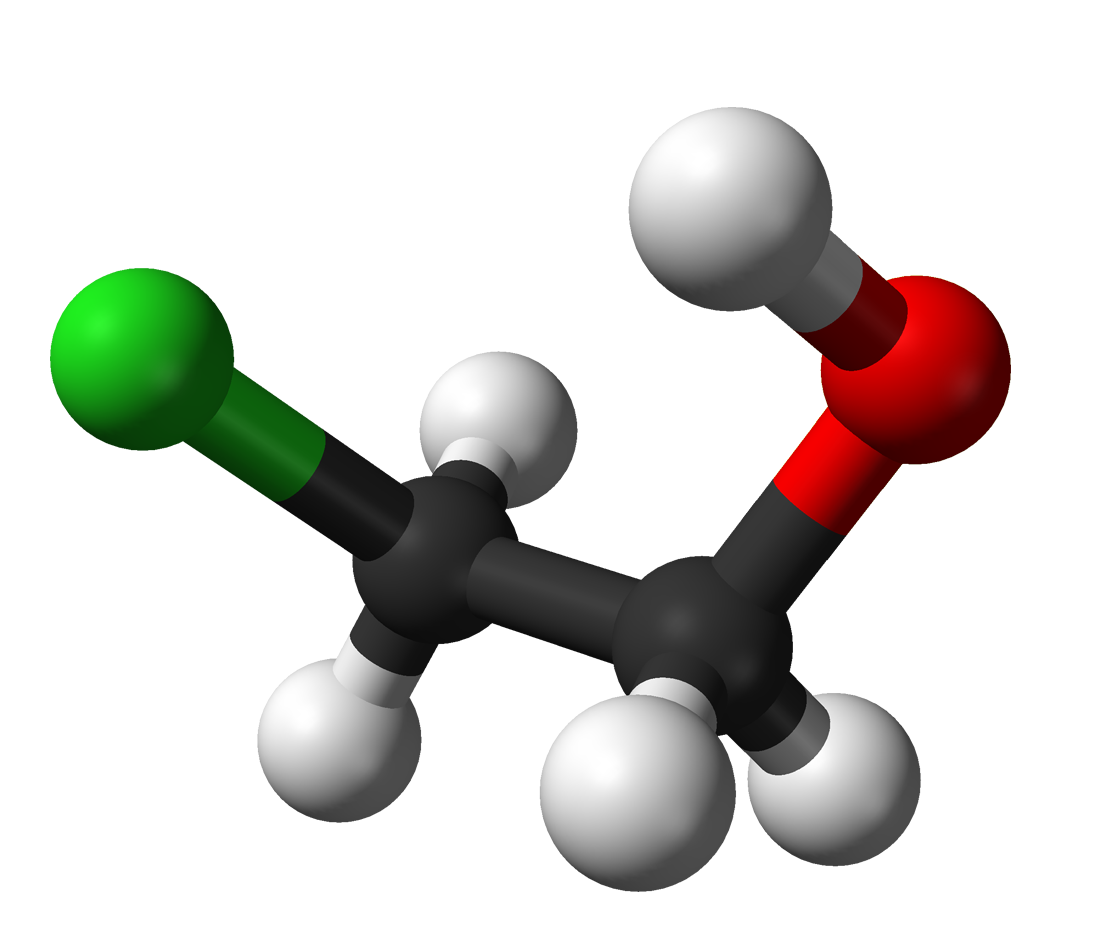
Ball and stick model of 2-chloroethanol
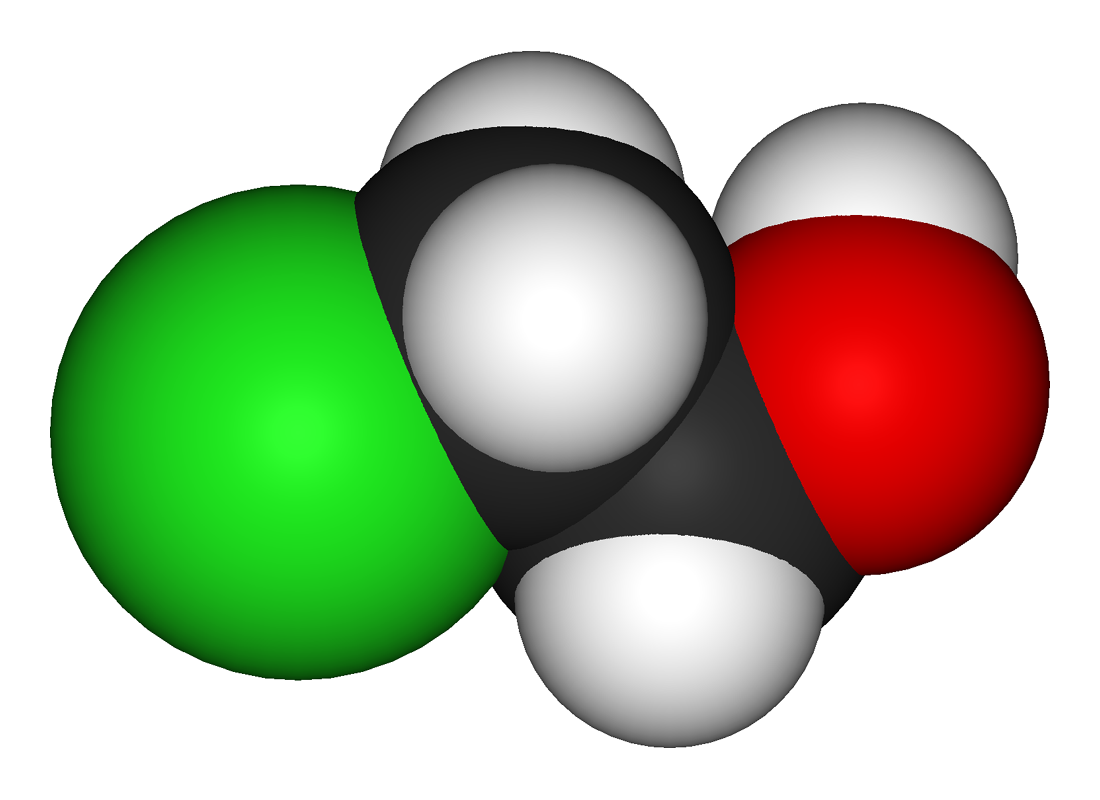
Spacefill model of 2-chloroethanol

Names
- Preferred IUPAC name 2-Chloroethan-1-ol
- Other names: 2-Chloroethanol; beta-Chloroethanol; 2-Chloro-1-ethanol; β-Chloroethanol; δ-Chloroethanol; 2-Chloroethyl alcohol; Ethyl chlorhydrin; Ethylene chlorohydrin; Glycol chlorohydrin; Glycol monochlorohydrin; 2-Hydroxyethyl chloride; β-Hydroxyethyl chloride; 2-Monochloroethanol

Identifiers
CAS Number	107-07-3
3D model (JSmol)	Interactive image
Beilstein Reference	878139
ChEBI	CHEBI:28200
ChEMBL	ChEMBL191244
ChemSpider	21106015
ECHA InfoCard	100.003.146
EC Number	203-459-7
Gmelin Reference	25389
KEGG	C06753
MeSH	Ethylene+Chlorohydrin
PubChem CID	34
RTECS number	KK0875000
UNII	753N66IHAN
UN number	1135
CompTox Dashboard (EPA)	DTXSID1021877
- InChI: InChI=1S/C2H5ClO/c3-1-2-4/h4H,1-2H2 Key: SZIFAVKTNFCBPC-UHFFFAOYSA-N
- SMILES: OCCCl

Properties
Chemical formula	C_{2}H_{5}ClO
Molar mass	80.51 g·mol^{−1}
Appearance	Colourless liquid
Odor	ether-like
Density	1.201 g/mL
Melting point	−62.60 °C; −80.68 °F; 210.55 K
Boiling point	127–131 °C; 260–268 °F; 400–404 K
Solubility in water	Miscible
log P	−0.107
Vapor pressure	700 Pa (at 20 °C)
Refractive index (n_{D})	1.441

Thermochemistry
Std enthalpy of combustion (Δ_{c}H^{⦵}_{298})	−1.1914 MJ/mol

Hazards
- Occupational safety and health (OHS/OSH)
Main hazards	Highly toxic and flammable
- GHS labelling
Pictograms	(GHS02: Flammable) (GHS06: Toxic)
Signal word	Danger
Hazard statements	H226, H300+H310+H330
Precautionary statements	P260, P280, P284, P301+P310, P302+P350
NFPA 704 (fire diamond)	4 2 0
Flash point	55 °C (131 °F; 328 K)
Autoignition temperature	425 °C (797 °F; 698 K)
Explosive limits	5–16%
- Lethal dose or concentration (LD, LC)
LD_{50} (median dose)	67 mg/kg (dermal, rabbit); 72 mg/kg (rat, oral); 81 mg/kg (mouse, oral); 71 mg/kg (rat, oral); 110 mg/kg (guinea pig, oral)
LC_{50} (median concentration)	7.5 ppm (rat, 1 h); 32 ppm (rat, 4 h); 260 ppm (guinea pig); 33 ppm (rat, 4 h); 87 ppm (rat); 115 ppm (mouse)
- NIOSH (US health exposure limits)
PEL (Permissible)	TWA 5 ppm (16 mg/m^{3}) [skin]
REL (Recommended)	C 1 ppm (3 mg/m^{3}) [skin]
IDLH (Immediate danger)	7 ppm

Related compounds
Related compounds	Chloromethane; Chloroiodomethane; Bromochloromethane; Dibromochloromethane; Isobutyl chloride; 2-Bromo-1-chloropropane
- Except where otherwise noted, data are given for materials in their standard state (at 25 °C [77 °F], 100 kPa). verify (what is ?) Infobox references

2-Chloroethanol (also called ethylene chlorohydrin or glycol chlorohydrin) is an organic chemical compound with the chemical formula ClCH_{2}CH_{2}OH and the simplest beta-halohydrin (chlorohydrin). This colorless liquid has a pleasant ether-like odor. It is miscible with water. The molecule is bifunctional, consisting of both an alkyl chloride and an alcohol functional group.

== Synthesis and applications ==
2-Chloroethanol is produced by treating ethylene with hypochlorous acid:

2-Chloroethanol was once produced on a large scale as a precursor to ethylene oxide:

ClCH_{2}CH_{2}OH + NaOH → C_{2}H_{4}O + NaCl + H_{2}O

This application has been supplanted by the more economic direct oxidation of ethylene. Otherwise chloroethanol is still used in the production of pharmaceuticals, biocides, and plasticizers. Many of these applications entail its use in installing 2-hydroxyethyl groups. Several dyes are prepared by the alkylation of aniline derivatives with chloroethanol. It is also used for manufacture of thiodiglycol.

It is a solvent for cellulose acetate and ethyl cellulose, textile printing dyes, in dewaxing, refining of rosin, extraction of pine lignin, and the cleaning of machines.

== Environmental aspects ==
Chloroethanol is a metabolite in the degradation of 1,2-dichloroethane. The alcohol is then further oxidized via chloroacetaldehyde to chloroacetate. This metabolic pathway is topical since billions of kilograms of 1,2-dichloroethane are processed annually as a precursor to vinyl chloride.

== Safety ==
2-Chloroethanol is toxic with an LD_{50} of 89 mg/kg in rats. Like most organochlorine compounds, chloroethanol releases hydrochloric acid and phosgene when burned.

In regards to dermal exposure to 2-chloroethanol, the Occupational Safety and Health Administration has set a permissible exposure limit of 5 ppm (16 mg/m^{3}) over an eight-hour time-weighted average, while the National Institute for Occupational Safety and Health has a more protective recommended exposure limit of a 1 ppm (3 mg/m^{3}) exposure ceiling.

It is classified as an extremely hazardous substance in the United States as defined in Section 302 of the U.S. Emergency Planning and Community Right-to-Know Act (42 U.S.C. 11002), and is subject to strict reporting requirements by facilities which produce, store, or use it in significant quantities.
