= 2-Bromo-1-chloropropane =

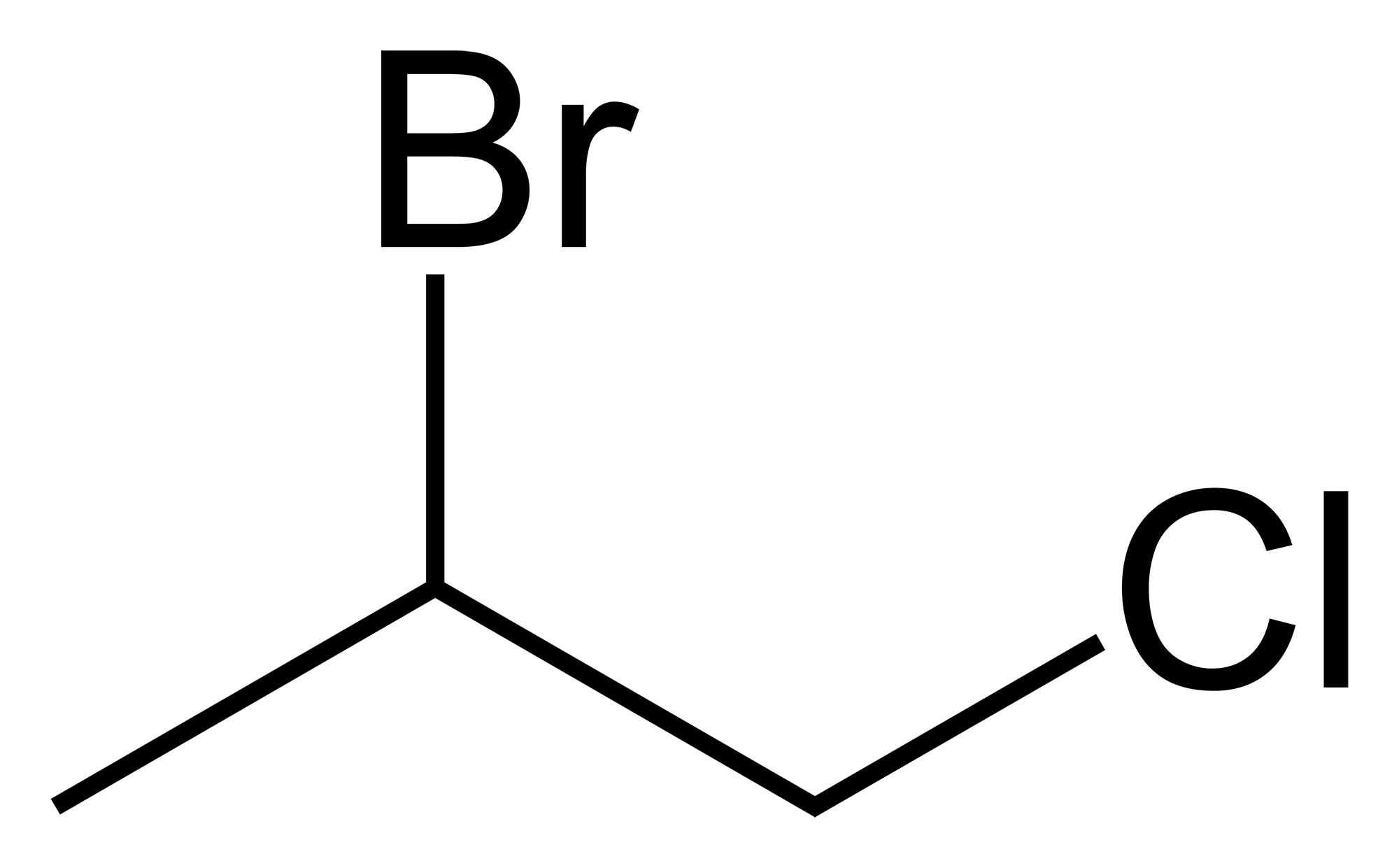
Skeletal formula of 2-bromo-1-chloropropane
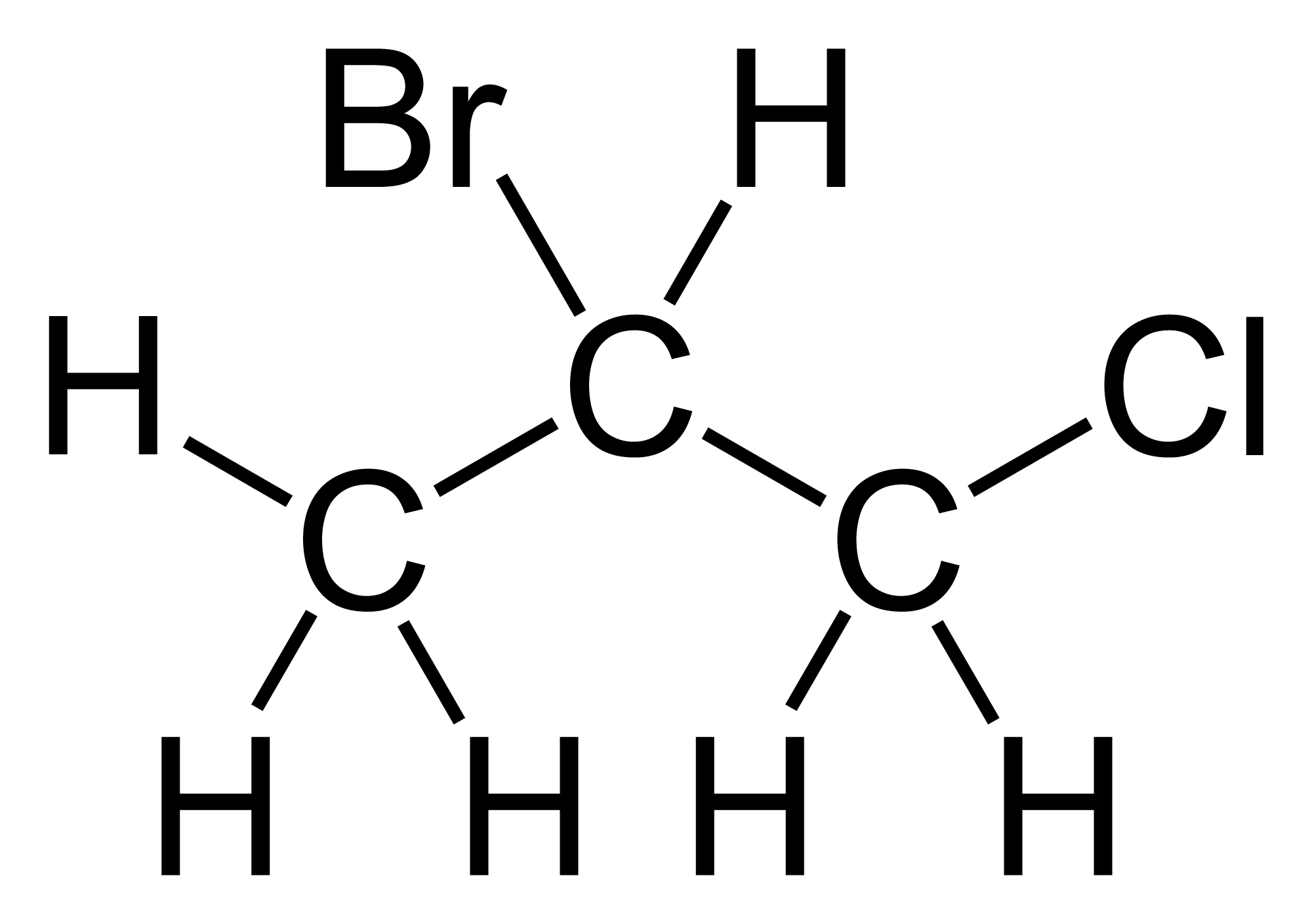
Skeletal formula of 2-bromo-1-chloropropane with all explicit hydrogens added
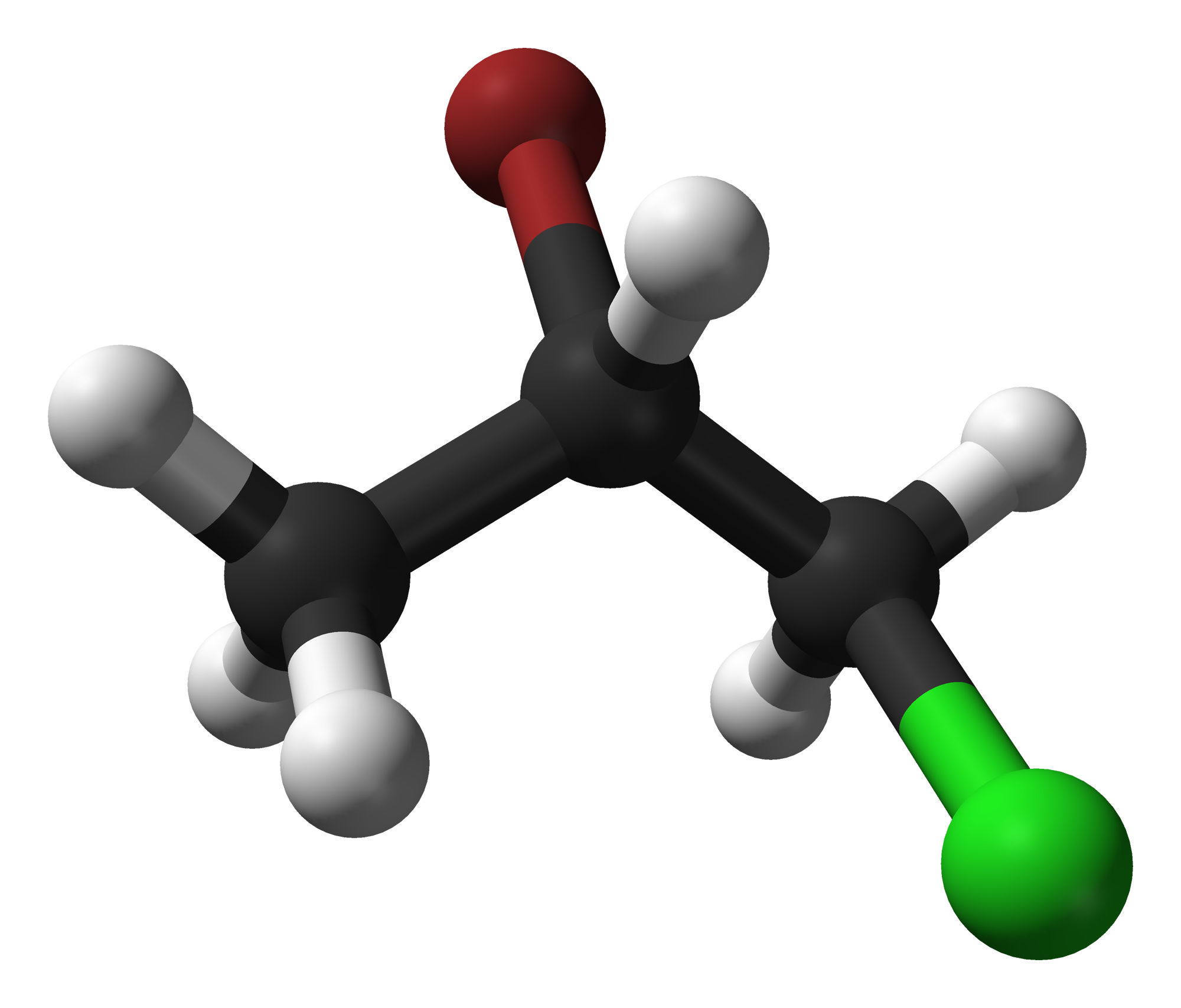

Names
- Preferred IUPAC name 2-Bromo-1-chloropropane

Identifiers
CAS Number	3017-95-6
3D model (JSmol)	Interactive image
ChEMBL	ChEMBL160835
ChemSpider	17167; 557391 S
ECHA InfoCard	100.019.235
EC Number	221-157-3
PubChem CID	18175; 642170 S
UNII	KNA8VTX8BT
CompTox Dashboard (EPA)	DTXSID30871003
- InChI: InChI=1S/C3H6BrCl/c1-3(4)2-5/h3H,2H2,1H3 Key: PUJJZGFFAQHYEX-UHFFFAOYSA-N
- SMILES: CC(Br)CCl

Properties
Chemical formula	C_{3}H_{6}BrCl
Molar mass	157.44 g·mol^{−1}
Appearance	Colourless liquid
Density	1.537 g mL^{−1}
Boiling point	116.6 °C; 241.8 °F; 389.7 K
log P	2.262
Refractive index (n_{D})	1.4783

Hazards
- GHS labelling
Pictograms	(GHS07: Exclamation mark)
Signal word	Warning
Hazard statements	H302, H312, H315, H319, H332, H335
Precautionary statements	P261, P280, P305+P351+P338
Flash point	113 °C (235 °F; 386 K)

Related compounds
Related alkanes	Isobutyl chloride
Related compounds	2-Chloroethanol
- Except where otherwise noted, data are given for materials in their standard state (at 25 °C [77 °F], 100 kPa). verify (what is ?) Infobox references

2-Bromo-1-chloropropane, C_{3}H_{6}BrCl, is an alkyl halide. This simple compound has a chiral center and is used sometimes to determine the enantiomeric resolution of simple chromatographic methods.
