= Alkylhalidase =

alkylhalidase

Identifiers
- EC no.: 3.8.1.1
- CAS no.: 9025-22-3

Databases
- IntEnz: IntEnz view
- BRENDA: BRENDA entry
- ExPASy: NiceZyme view
- KEGG: KEGG entry
- MetaCyc: metabolic pathway
- PRIAM: profile
- PDB structures: RCSB PDB PDBe PDBsum
- Gene Ontology: AmiGO / QuickGO
Search
- PMC: articles
- PubMed: articles
- NCBI: proteins

In enzymology, an alkylhalidase (EC 3.8.1.1) is an enzyme that catalyzes the chemical reaction

bromochloromethane + H_{2}O $\rightleftharpoons$ formaldehyde + bromide + chloride

Thus, the two substrates of this enzyme are bromochloromethane and H_{2}O, whereas its 3 products are formaldehyde, bromide, and chloride.

This enzyme belongs to the family of hydrolases, specifically those acting on halide bonds in carbon-halide compounds. The systematic name of this enzyme class is alkyl-halide halidohydrolase. Other names in common use include halogenase, haloalkane halidohydrolase, and haloalkane dehalogenase.
