= Tribromoiodomethane =

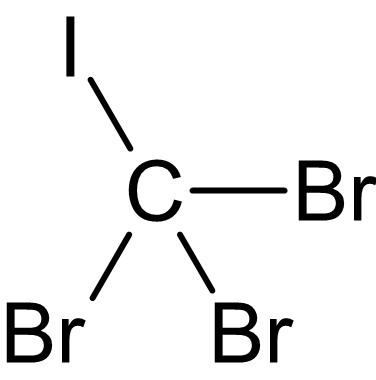

Names
- Preferred IUPAC name Tribromo(iodo)methane

Identifiers
CAS Number	14349-80-5
3D model (JSmol)	Interactive image
ChemSpider	11570030
PubChem CID	12542274
- InChI: InChI=1S/CBr3I/c2-1(3,4)5 Key: JWCWGHDHZXYEGQ-UHFFFAOYSA-N
- SMILES: C(Br)(Br)(Br)I

Properties
Chemical formula	CBr_{3}I
Molar mass	378.627 g·mol^{−1}
Appearance	golden-yellow crystalline
Density	3.7 g/cm³
Boiling point	226.8 °C (440.2 °F; 499.9 K)

Hazards
Flash point	91 °C

Related compounds
Related compounds	Tribromochloromethane; Tetrabromomethane; Dibromodiiodomethane
- Except where otherwise noted, data are given for materials in their standard state (at 25 °C [77 °F], 100 kPa). Infobox references

Tribromoiodomethane is a tetrahalomethane with the chemical formula CBr_{3}I. This is a halomethane containing three bromine atoms and one iodine atom attached to the methane backbone.

== Synthesis ==
The compound can be obtained by reacting carbon tetrabromide and sodium iodide in acetone with a yield of 30%. The remaining products of the reaction are brominated acetone and trace amounts of bromotriiodomethane.

CBr_{4} + NaI + acetone → CBr_{3}I + CBrI_{3} + brominated acetone

Tribromoiodomethane can also be produced by the reaction of nitrotribromomethane with a small amount of potassium iodide:

CBr_{3}NO_{2} + KI → CBr_{3}I + KNO_{2}

== Uses ==
The compound can be used to introduce tribromomethyl groups into organic compounds.
