= (Chloromethylene)triphenylphosphorane =

Names
- Preferred IUPAC name (Chloromethylidene)tri(phenyl)-λ^{5}-phosphane

Identifiers
CAS Number	29949-92-6
3D model (JSmol)	Interactive image
ChemSpider	366640
PubChem CID	414080
CompTox Dashboard (EPA)	DTXSID601336672
- InChI: InChI=1S/C19H16ClP/c20-16-21(17-10-4-1-5-11-17,18-12-6-2-7-13-18)19-14-8-3-9-15-19/h1-16H Key: KIZBYQRDCHVQID-UHFFFAOYSA-N
- SMILES: C1=CC=C(C=C1)P(=CCl)(C2=CC=CC=C2)C3=CC=CC=C3

Properties
Chemical formula	C_{19}H_{16}ClP
Molar mass	310.76 g·mol^{−1}
Appearance	white solid
- Except where otherwise noted, data are given for materials in their standard state (at 25 °C [77 °F], 100 kPa). Infobox references

(Chloromethylene)triphenylphosphorane is the organophosphorus compound with the formula Ph_{3}P=CHCl (Ph = phenyl). It is a white solid but is usually generated and used in situ as a reagent in organic synthesis. It is structurally and chemically related to methylenetriphenylphosphorane.

The reagent is prepared by treating the chloromethylphosphonium salt [Ph_{3}PCH_{2}Cl]I with strong base, the salt being formed from triphenylphosphine and chloroiodomethane.

(Chloromethylene)triphenylphosphorane converts aldehydes to vinyl chlorides:

RCHO + Ph_{3}P=CHCl → RCH=CHCl + Ph_{3}PO

These vinyl chlorides undergo dehydrochlorination to give alkynes:

RCH=CHCl + NaN(SiMe_{3})_{2} → RC≡CH + NaCl + HN(SiMe_{3})_{2}

== Related compounds ==
- (Iodomethylene)triphenylphosphorane
- (Dichloromethylene)triphenylphosphorane
