= Isobutyl chloride =

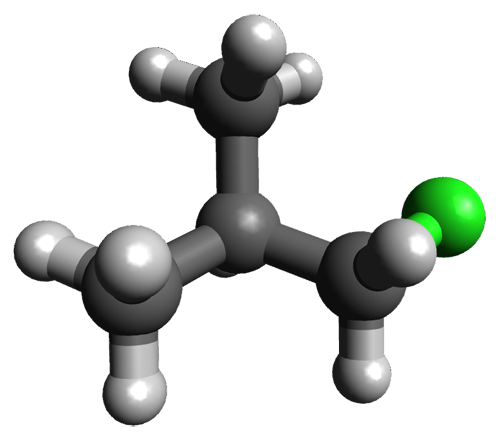

Names
- Preferred IUPAC name 1-Chloro-2-methylpropane

Identifiers
CAS Number	513-36-0
3D model (JSmol)	Interactive image
Beilstein Reference	635650
ChEMBL	ChEMBL160966
ChemSpider	10114
ECHA InfoCard	100.007.417
EC Number	208-157-9
PubChem CID	10554
UNII	95E08D17M7
UN number	1127
CompTox Dashboard (EPA)	DTXSID4060153
- InChI: InChI=1S/C4H9Cl/c1-4(2)3-5/h4H,3H2,1-2H3 Key: QTBFPMKWQKYFLR-UHFFFAOYSA-N
- SMILES: CC(C)CCl

Properties
Chemical formula	C_{4}H_{9}Cl
Molar mass	92.57 g·mol^{−1}
Appearance	Colourless liquid
Density	877 mg mL^{−1}
Melting point	−131 °C (−204 °F; 142 K)
Boiling point	68.3 to 69.3 °C; 154.8 to 156.7 °F; 341.4 to 342.4 K
log P	2.486
Henry's law constant (k_{H})	630 nmol Pa^{−1} kg^{−1}
Refractive index (n_{D})	1.398

Thermochemistry
Heat capacity (C)	158.6 J K^{−1} mol^{−1}
Std enthalpy of combustion (Δ_{c}H^{⦵}_{298})	−2.7012–−2.6844 MJ mol^{−1}

Hazards
- GHS labelling
Pictograms	(GHS02: Flammable)
Signal word	Danger
Hazard statements	H225
Precautionary statements	P210
Flash point	−19.4 °C (−2.9 °F; 253.8 K)

Related compounds
Related alkanes	2-bromo-1-chloropropane
Related compounds	2-chloroethanol
- Except where otherwise noted, data are given for materials in their standard state (at 25 °C [77 °F], 100 kPa). Infobox references

Isobutyl chloride (1-chloro-2-methylpropane) is an organochlorine compound. It is a chlorinated derivative of isobutane.

== Synthesis ==
Isobutyl chloride can be synthesized in a substitution reaction by reacting isobutanol with hydrochloric acid, catalyzed by concentrated sulfuric acid:

(CH_{3})_{2}CH−CH_{2}−OH + HCl → (CH_{3})_{2}CH−CH_{2}−Cl
