= Chlorotriiodomethane =

Names
- Preferred IUPAC name Chloro(triiodo)methane

Identifiers
CAS Number	14349-82-7
3D model (JSmol)	Interactive image
ChemSpider	11570036
PubChem CID	15682858
CompTox Dashboard (EPA)	DTXSID30576809
- InChI: InChI=1S/CClI3/c2-1(3,4)5 Key: NHPRHZOZGKPNLB-UHFFFAOYSA-N
- SMILES: ClC(I)(I)I

Properties
Chemical formula	CClI_{3}
Molar mass	428.17 g·mol^{−1}
Density	3.8 g/cm^{3}
Boiling point	268.8 °C (515.8 °F; 542.0 K)

Hazards
Flash point	116.4±18.4 °C
- Except where otherwise noted, data are given for materials in their standard state (at 25 °C [77 °F], 100 kPa). Infobox references

Chlorotriiodomethane is a tetrahalomethane with the chemical formula CClI_{3}. This is a halomethane containing one iodine atom and three chlorine atoms attached to the methane backbone.

== Synthesis ==
Chlorination of iodoform with phosphorus pentachloride leads to carbon tetrachloride via a chlorotriiodomethane intermediate.

It can also be obtained by distilling trichloroacetyl chloride and hydrogen iodide at 140 °C, with hexachloroethane as a byproduct. Trichloromethane or carbon tetrachloride can also be reacted with iodine and sodium hydroxide at 0 °C to obtain the compound, but the yield is very low.
