= Tribromofluoromethane =

Names
- Preferred IUPAC name Tribromo(fluoro)methane
- Other names Tribromofluoromethane; Tribromo-fluoro-methane; Fluorotribromomethane; Halon 1103; FC-11B3; R 11B3

Identifiers
CAS Number	353-54-8
3D model (JSmol)	Interactive image
ChemSpider	61026
ECHA InfoCard	100.005.942
EC Number	206-535-8
PubChem CID	67707
CompTox Dashboard (EPA)	DTXSID2059859
- InChI: InChI=1S/CBr3F/c2-1(3,4)5 Key: IHZAEIHJPNTART-UHFFFAOYSA-N; InChI=1/CBr3F/c2-1(3,4)5
- SMILES: BrC(Br)(Br)F

Properties
Chemical formula	CBr_{3}F
Molar mass	270.72 g/mol
Appearance	Clear yellow liquid
Density	2.7650 g/cm^{3} at 25 °C; 1.8211 g/cm^{3} at 0 °C
Melting point	−73 °C (−99 °F; 200 K)
Boiling point	108 °C (226 °F; 381 K)

Hazards
- Occupational safety and health (OHS/OSH)
Main hazards	Irritant
- Except where otherwise noted, data are given for materials in their standard state (at 25 °C [77 °F], 100 kPa). verify (what is ?) Infobox references

Tribromofluoromethane also known as Halon 1103 or R 11B3, is a fully halogenated mixed halomethane or, more exactly, a bromofluorocarbon (BFC). It is a colorless to yellow liquid

Tribromofluoromethane can be used in fire extinguishers.

== Table of physical properties ==
Property	Value
Refractive index, n, at 20 °C	1.5216
Surface tension at 20 °C	31.68 mN·m^{−1}
Viscosity at 0 °C	2.09 mPa·s, 2.09 cP

== History ==
Tribromofluoromethane was first synthesised in 1919 by Hans Rathburg. It was later prepared by reacting carbon tetrabromide with antimony trifluoride and elemental bromine by heating at 120 to 130 °C (248 to 266 °F; 393 to 403 K) for 1 hour and having the tribromofluormethane distill off.

== Chemistry ==
Pyrolysis of tribromofluoromethane yields hexafluorobenzene at up to a 45 percent yield, plus bromine, alongside small quantities of bromopentafluorobenzene.

The bromines in tribromofluoromethane can be substituted by reactive metals like lithium and zinc using organometallic compounds, ultimately creating fluorinated alcohols by addition of carbonyl compounds.

Tribromofluoromethane also forms phosphorus ylides which can be used to synthesise bromofluoro-substituted terminal alkenes. Similar loss of bromine takes place through cyclisation with hydrazones to form 4-fluoro pyrazoles.
