= Dibromodichloromethane =

Names
- Other names Carbon dibromide dichloride

Identifiers
CAS Number	594-18-3
3D model (JSmol)	Interactive image
ChemSpider	11169
ECHA InfoCard	100.008.938
EC Number	209-829-4
PubChem CID	11659
UNII	J0GOV5L37I
CompTox Dashboard (EPA)	DTXSID4024014
- InChI: InChI=1S/CBr2Cl2/c2-1(3,4)5 Key: IHUREIPXVFKEDT-UHFFFAOYSA-N
- SMILES: C(Cl)(Cl)(Br)Br

Properties
Chemical formula	CBr_{2}Cl_{2}
Molar mass	242.72 g·mol^{−1}
Appearance	solid
Density	2.433 g/cm³
Melting point	38 °C (100 °F; 311 K)
Boiling point	130.2 °C (266.4 °F; 403.3 K)
Solubility in water	insoluble

Hazards
- GHS labelling
Pictograms	(GHS07: Exclamation mark)
Signal word	Warning
Flash point	32.6 °C

Related compounds
Related compounds	Bromotrichloromethane; Tribromochloromethane
- Except where otherwise noted, data are given for materials in their standard state (at 25 °C [77 °F], 100 kPa). Infobox references

Dibromodichloromethane is a tetrahalomethane with the chemical formula CBr_{2}Cl_{2}. This is a halomethane containing two bromine atoms and two chlorine atoms attached to the methane backbone.

== Synthesis ==
Dibromodichloromethane can be obtained by treating tetrachloromethane with bromine trifluoride in the presence of aluminum chloride or boron tribromide.

Also it can be obtained, by the reaction of carbon tetrachloride and aluminum tribromide.

== Physical properties ==
Dibromodichloromethane forms a solid, insoluble in water. It reacts with alkenes by addition of bromine and dichlorobromomethyl.

Dibromodichloromethane is a potentially toxic compound.
