= Dibromodiiodomethane =

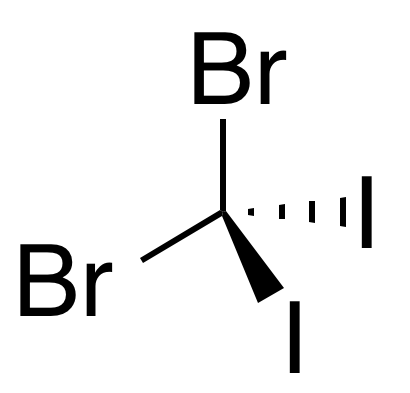

Names
- Preferred IUPAC name Dibromo(diiodo)methane

Identifiers
CAS Number	14059-90-6
3D model (JSmol)	Interactive image
ChemSpider	15415424
PubChem CID	15682862
- InChI: InChI=1S/CBr2I2/c2-1(3,4)5 Key: YMAZMLNKUPTRRW-UHFFFAOYSA-N
- SMILES: C(Br)(Br)(I)I

Properties
Chemical formula	CBr_{2}I_{2}
Molar mass	425.628 g·mol^{−1}
Density	3.9 g/cm^{3}
Boiling point	266.6 °C (511.9 °F; 539.8 K)

Hazards
Flash point	115 °C
- Except where otherwise noted, data are given for materials in their standard state (at 25 °C [77 °F], 100 kPa). Infobox references

Dibromodiiodomethane is a tetrahalomethane with the chemical formula CBr_{2}I_{2}. This is a halomethane containing two bromine and two iodine atoms attached to methane backbone.
