= Halomethane =

Halogen compounds derived from methane

A methane molecule in 3D space filling model.

Halomethane compounds are derivatives of methane (CH_{4}) with one or more of the hydrogen atoms replaced with halogen atoms (F, Cl, Br, or I). They are a class of Halons. Halomethanes are both naturally occurring, especially in marine environments, and human-made, most notably as refrigerants, solvents, propellants, and fumigants. Many, including the chlorofluorocarbons, have attracted wide attention because they become active when exposed to ultraviolet light found at high altitudes and destroy the Earth's protective ozone layer.

== Structure and properties ==
Like methane itself, halomethanes are tetrahedral molecules. The halogen atoms differ greatly in size and charge from hydrogen and from each other. Consequently, most halomethanes deviate from the perfect tetrahedral symmetry of methane.

The physical properties of halomethanes depend on the number and identity of the halogen atoms in the compound. In general, halomethanes are volatile but less so than methane because of the polarizability of the halides. The polarizability of the halides and the polarity of the molecules makes them useful as solvents. The halomethanes are far less flammable than methane. Broadly speaking, reactivity of the compounds is greatest for the iodides and lowest for the fluorides.

== Production ==
=== Industrial routes ===
The halomethanes are produced on an industrial scale from abundant precursors such as natural gas or methanol, and from halogens or halides. They are usually prepared by one of three methods.

- Free radical chlorination of methane (under ultraviolet light):

CH_{4} + Cl_{2} → CH_{3}Cl + HCl

This method is useful for the production of CH_{4−n}Cl_{n} (n = 1, 2, 3, or 4). The main problems with this method are that it cogenerates HCl and it produces mixtures of different products. Using CH_{4} in large excess generates primarily CH_{3}Cl and using Cl_{2} in large excess generates primarily CCl_{4}, but mixtures of other products will still be present.

- Halogenation of methanol. This method is used for the production of the mono-chloride, -bromide, and -iodide.

CH_{3}OH + HCl → CH_{3}Cl + H_{2}O
4 CH_{3}OH + 3 Br_{2} + S → 4 CH_{3}Br + H_{2}SO_{4} + 2 HBr
3 CH_{3}OH + 3 I_{2} + P → 3 CH_{3}I + HPO(OH)_{2} + 3 HI

- Halogen exchange. The method is mainly used to produce fluorinated derivatives from the chlorides.

CH_{3}Cl + HF → CH_{3}F + HCl
CH_{2}Cl_{2} + HF → CH_{2}FCl + HCl
CH_{2}Cl_{2} + 2 HF → CH_{2}F_{2} + 2 HCl
CH_{2}Cl_{2} + F_{2} → CH_{2}F_{2} + Cl_{2}
CHCl_{3} + HF → CHFCl_{2} + HCl
CHCl_{3} + 2 HF → CHF_{2}Cl + 2 HCl
CHCl_{3} + F_{2} → CHF_{2}Cl + Cl_{2}
CHCl_{3} + 3 HF → CHF_{3} + 3 HCl
CHCl_{3} + F_{2} + HF → CHF_{3} + Cl_{2} + HCl
CCl_{4} + HF → CFCl_{3} + HCl
CCl_{4} + 2 HF → CF_{2}Cl_{2} + 2 HCl
CCl_{4} + F_{2} → CF_{2}Cl_{2} + Cl_{2}
CCl_{4} + 3 HF → CF_{3}Cl + 3 HCl
CCl_{4} + F_{2} + HF → CF_{3}Cl + Cl_{2} + HCl
CCl_{4} + 4 HF → CF_{4} + 4 HCl
CCl_{4} + F_{2} + 2 HF → CF_{4} + Cl_{2} + 2 HCl
CCl_{4} + 2 F_{2} → CF_{4} + 2 Cl_{2}

- Reaction of methane with hypochlorous acid, producing water.

CH_{4} + HOCl → CH_{3}Cl + H_{2}O

- Reaction of methanol with hypochlorous acid, producing hydrogen peroxide.

CH_{3}OH + HOCl → CH_{3}Cl + H_{2}O_{2}

Traces of halomethanes in the atmosphere arise through the introduction of other non-natural, industrial materials.

=== In nature ===
Many marine organisms biosynthesize halomethanes, especially bromine-containing compounds. Small amounts of chloromethanes arise from the interaction of chlorine sources with various carbon compounds. The biosyntheses of these halomethanes are catalyzed by the chloroperoxidase and bromoperoxidase enzymes, respectively. An idealized equation is:

2 CH_{4} + 2 Cl^{−} + O_{2} → 2 CH_{3}Cl + 2 OH^{−}

== Classes of compounds ==
Halons are usually defined as hydrocarbons where the hydrogen atoms have been replaced by bromine, along with other halogens. They are referred to by a system of code numbers similar to (but simpler than) the system used for freons. The first digit specifies the number of carbon atoms in the molecule, the second is the number of fluorine atoms, the third is the chlorine atoms, and the fourth is the number of bromine atoms. If the number includes a fifth digit, the fifth number indicates the number of iodine atoms (though iodine in halon is rare). Any bonds not taken up by halogen atoms are then allocated to hydrogen atoms.

For example, consider Halon 1211. This halon has number 1211 in its name, which tells it has 1 carbon atom, 2 fluorine atoms, 1 chlorine atom, and 1 bromine atom. A single carbon only has four bonds, all of which are taken by the halogen atoms, so there is no hydrogen. Thus its formula is CF_{2}ClBr, hence its IUPAC name is bromochlorodifluoromethane.

=== ANSI/ASHRAE Standard 34-1992 ===
The refrigerant naming system is mainly used for fluorinated and chlorinated short alkanes used as refrigerants. In the United States, the standard is specified in ANSI/ASHRAE Standard 34–1992, with additional annual supplements. The specified ANSI/ASHRAE prefixes were FC (fluorocarbon) or R (refrigerant), but today most are prefixed by a more specific classification:

- CFC—list of chlorofluorocarbons
- HCFC—list of hydrochlorofluorocarbons
- HFC—list of hydrofluorocarbons
- FC—list of fluorocarbons
- PFC—list of perfluorocarbons (completely fluorinated)

The decoding system for CFC-01234a is:

- 0 = Number of double bonds (omitted if zero)
- 1 = Carbon atoms -1 (omitted if zero)
- 2 = Hydrogen atoms +1
- 3 = Fluorine atoms
- 4 = Replaced by Bromine ("B" prefix added)
- a = Letter added to identify isomers, the "normal" isomer in any number has the smallest mass difference on each carbon, and a, b, or c are added as the masses diverge from normal.

Other coding systems are in use as well.

=== Hydrofluoro compounds (HFC) ===
Hydrofluorocarbons (HFCs) contain no chlorine. They are composed entirely of carbon, hydrogen, and fluorine. They have no known effects on the ozone layer; fluorine itself is not ozone-toxic. However, HFCs and perfluorocarbons (PFCs) are greenhouse gases, which cause global warming. Two groups of haloalkanes, hydrofluorocarbons (HFCs) and perfluorocarbons, are targets of the Kyoto Protocol. Allan Thornton, President of the Environmental Investigation Agency, a non-governmental, environmental watchdog, says that HFCs are up to 12,500 times as potent as carbon dioxide in global warming. The higher global warming potential has two causes: HFCs remain in the atmosphere for long periods of time, and they have more chemical bonds than CO_{2}, which means that they are able to absorb more solar energy per molecule than carbon dioxide. Wealthy countries are clamping down on these gases. Thornton says that many countries are needlessly producing these chemicals just to get the carbon credits. Thus, as a result of carbon trading rules under the Kyoto Protocol, nearly half the credits from developing countries are from HFCs, with China scoring billions of dollars from catching and destroying HFCs that would be in the atmosphere as industrial byproducts.

=== Overview of principal halomethanes ===
Most permutations of hydrogen, fluorine, chlorine, bromine, and iodine on one carbon atom have been evaluated experimentally.

Overview of Halomethanes
| Systematic name | Common/trivial name(s) | Code | Use | Chemical formula |
|---|---|---|---|---|
| Tetrachloromethane | Carbon tetrachloride, Freon 10 (Freon is a trade name for a group of chlorofluorocarbons used primarily as a refrigerant. The main chemical used under this trademark is dichlorodifluoromethane. The word Freon is a registered trademark belonging to DuPont.) | CFC-10 | Formerly in fire extinguishers | CCl_{4} |
| Tetrabromomethane | Carbon tetrabromide | | | CBr_{4} |
| Tetraiodomethane | Carbon tetraiodide | | | CI_{4} |
| Tetrafluoromethane | Carbon tetrafluoride, Freon 14 | PFC-14 (CFC-14 and HF-14 also used, although formally incorrect) | | CF_{4} |
| Chloromethane | Methyl chloride | | Methylation agent; e.g., for methyl trichlorosilane | CH_{3}Cl |
| Dichloromethane | Methylene chloride | | Solvent | CH_{2}Cl_{2} |
| Trichloromethane | Chloroform | | Solvent | CHCl_{3} |
| Trichlorofluoromethane | Freon-11, R-11 | CFC-11 | | CCl_{3}F |
| Dichlorodifluoromethane | Freon-12, R-12 | CFC-12 | | CCl_{2}F_{2} |
| Chlorotrifluoromethane | | CFC-13 | | CClF_{3} |
| Chlorodifluoromethane | R-22 | HCFC-22 | | CHClF_{2} |
| Trifluoromethane | Fluoroform | HFC-23 | In semiconductor industry, refrigerant | CHF_{3} |
| Chlorofluoromethane | Freon 31 | | Refrigerant (phased out) | CH_{2}ClF |
| Difluoromethane | | HFC-32 | Refrigerant with zero ozone depletion potential | CH_{2}F_{2} |
| Fluoromethane | Methyl fluoride | HFC-41 | Semiconductor manufacture | CH_{3}F |
| Bromomethane | Methyl bromide | | Soil sterilant and fumigant, currently being phased out. It strongly depletes the ozone layer and is highly toxic. | CH_{3}Br |
| Dibromomethane | Methylene bromide | | Solvent and chemical intermediate. | CH_{2}Br_{2} |
| Tribromomethane | Bromoform | | For separation of heavy minerals | CHBr_{3} |
| Bromochloromethane | | Halon 1011 | Formerly in fire extinguishers | CH_{2}BrCl |
| Bromochlorodifluoromethane | BCF, Halon 1211 BCF, or Freon 12B1 | Halon 1211 | | CBrClF_{2} |
| Bromotrifluoromethane | BTM, Halon 1301 BTM, or Freon 13BI | Halon 1301 | | CBrF_{3} |
| Trifluoroiodomethane | Trifluoromethyl iodide | Freon 13T1 | Organic synthesis | CF_{3}I |
| Iodomethane | Methyl iodide | | Organic synthesis | CH_{3}I |

== Applications ==
Because they have many applications and are easily prepared, halomethanes have been of intense commercial interest.

=== Solvents ===
Dichloromethane is the most important halomethane-based solvent. Its volatility, low flammability, and ability to dissolve a wide range of organic compounds makes this colorless liquid a useful solvent. It is widely used as a paint stripper and a degreaser. In the food industry, it was previously used to decaffeinate coffee and tea as well as to prepare extracts of hops and other flavorings. Its volatility has led to its use as an aerosol spray propellant and as a blowing agent for polyurethane foams.

=== Propellants ===
One major use of CFCs has been as propellants of aerosols, including metered-dose inhalers for drugs used to treat asthma. The conversion of these devices and treatments from CFC to propellants that do not deplete the ozone layer is almost complete. Production and import is now banned in the United States.

=== Fire extinguishing ===
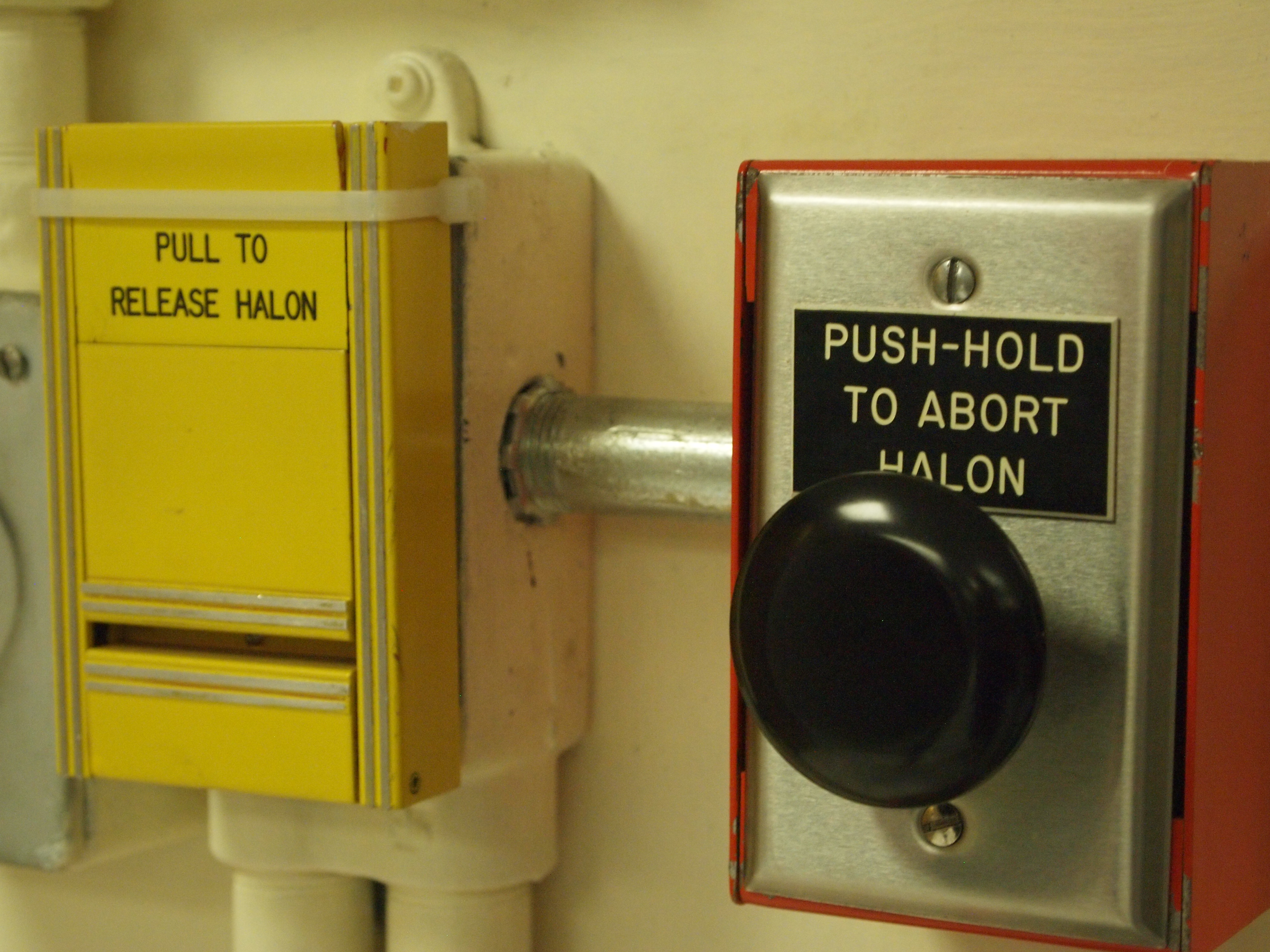
Halon-based fire extinguishing system inside Diefenbunker, a nuclear fallout bunker in Canada.

At high temperatures, halons decompose to release halogen atoms that combine readily with active hydrogen atoms, quenching flame propagation reactions even when adequate fuel, oxygen, and heat remain. The chemical reaction in a flame proceeds as a free radical chain reaction; by sequestering the radicals which propagate the reaction, halons are able to halt the fire at much lower concentrations than are required by fire suppressants using the more traditional methods of cooling, oxygen deprivation, or fuel dilution. As of 2023, due to ozone depletion problems, halon fire extinguishers are largely banned in some countries and alternatives are being deployed by the US military.

Halon 1301 total flooding systems are typically used at concentrations no higher than 7% by volume in air, and can suppress many fires at 2.9% v/v. By contrast, carbon dioxide fire suppression flood systems operate from 34% concentration by volume (surface-only combustion of liquid fuels) up to 75% (dust traps). Carbon dioxide can cause severe distress at concentrations of 3–6%, and has caused death by respiratory paralysis in a few minutes at 10% concentration. Halon 1301 causes only slight giddiness at its effective concentration of 5%, and even at 15% those exposed remain conscious but impaired and suffer no long-term effects. (Experimental animals have also been exposed to 2% concentrations of Halon 1301 for 30 hours per week for 4 months, with no discernible health effects.) Halon 1211 also has low toxicity, although it is more toxic than Halon 1301, and thus considered unsuitable for flooding systems.

However, Halon 1301 fire suppression is not completely non-toxic; very high temperature flame, or contact with red-hot metal, can cause decomposition of Halon 1301 to toxic byproducts. The presence of such byproducts is readily detected because they include hydrobromic acid and hydrofluoric acid, which are intensely irritating. Halons are very effective on Class A (organic solids), B (flammable liquids and gases), and C (electrical) fires, but they are unsuitable for Class D (metal) fires, as they will not only produce toxic gas and fail to halt the fire, but in some cases pose a risk of explosion. Halons can be used on Class K (kitchen oils and greases) fires, but offer no advantages over specialised foams.

Halon 1301 is common in total flooding systems. In these systems, banks of halon cylinders are kept pressurised to about 4 MPa (600 psi) with compressed nitrogen, and a fixed piping network leads to the protected enclosure. On triggering, the entire measured contents of one or more cylinders are discharged into the enclosure in a few seconds, through nozzles designed to ensure uniform mixing throughout the room. The quantity dumped is pre-calculated to achieve the desired concentration, typically 3–7% v/v. This level is maintained for some time, typically with a minimum of ten minutes and sometimes up to a twenty-minute "soak" time, to ensure all items have cooled so reignition is unlikely to occur, then the air in the enclosure is purged, generally via a fixed purge system that is activated by the proper authorities. During this time the enclosure may be entered by persons wearing SCBA. (There exists a common myth that this is because halon is highly toxic; in fact, it is because it can cause giddiness and mildly impaired perception, and due to the risk of combustion byproducts.)

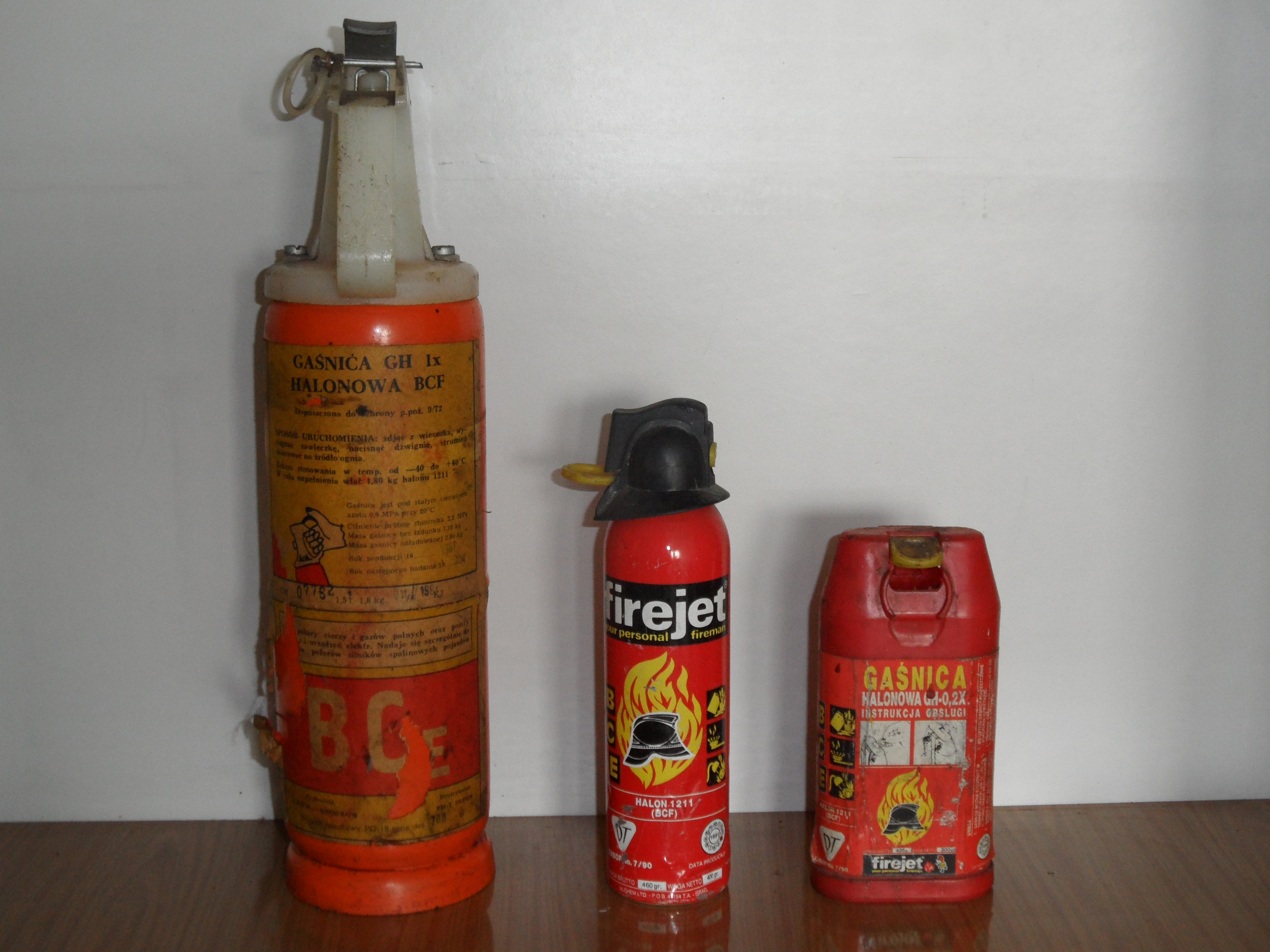
Halon-based hand-held fire extinguishers

Flooding systems may be manually operated or automatically triggered by a VESDA or other automatic detection system. In the latter case, a warning siren and strobe lamp will first be activated for a few seconds to warn personnel to evacuate the area. The rapid discharge of halon and consequent rapid cooling fills the air with fog, and is accompanied by a loud, disorienting noise.

Halon 1301 is also used in the inerting system of the F-16 fighter to prevent the fuel vapors in the fuel tanks from becoming explosive; when the aircraft enters an area with the possibility of attack, Halon 1301 is injected into the fuel tanks for one-time use. Due to ozone depletion, trifluoroiodomethane (CF_{3}I) is being considered as an alternative.

Halon 1211 is typically used in hand-held extinguishers, in which a stream of liquid halon is directed at a smaller fire by a user. The stream evaporates under reduced pressure, producing strong local cooling, as well as a high concentration of halon in the immediate vicinity of the fire. In this mode, fire is extinguished by cooling and oxygen deprivation at the core of the fire, as well as radical quenching over a larger area. After fire suppression, the halon diffuses, leaving no residue.

=== Chemical building blocks ===
Chloromethane and bromomethane are used to introduce methyl groups in organic synthesis. Chlorodifluoromethane is the main precursor of tetrafluoroethylene, which is the monomeric precursor to Teflon.

== Safety ==
Haloalkanes are diverse in their properties, making generalizations difficult. Few are acutely toxic, but many pose risks from prolonged exposure. Some problematic aspects include carcinogenicity and liver damage (e.g., carbon tetrachloride). Under certain combustion conditions, chloromethanes convert to phosgene, which is highly toxic.

== See also ==
- Halocarbon
- Haloalkane
- Halogenation
