= Dibromochloromethane =

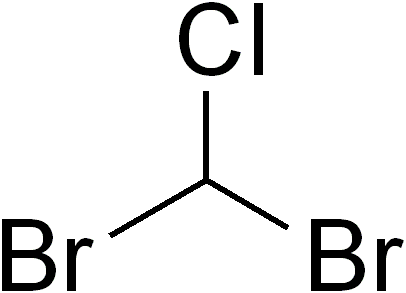
- Skeletal formula of dibromochloromethane

- Spacefill model of dibromochloromethane

Names
- Preferred IUPAC name Dibromo(chloro)methane
- Other names: Dibromochloromethane; Chlorodibromomethane; Monochlorodibromomethane

Identifiers
CAS Number	124-48-1
3D model (JSmol)	Interactive image
Abbreviations	CDBM
Beilstein Reference	1731046
ChEMBL	ChEMBL157093
ChemSpider	29036
ECHA InfoCard	100.004.277
EC Number	204-704-0
KEGG	C14692
MeSH	chlorodibromomethane
PubChem CID	31296
RTECS number	PA6360000
UNII	3T4AJR1H24
CompTox Dashboard (EPA)	DTXSID1020300
- InChI: InChI=1S/CHBr2Cl/c2-1(3)4/h1H Key: GATVIKZLVQHOMN-UHFFFAOYSA-N
- SMILES: ClC(Br)Br

Properties
Chemical formula	CHBr_{2}Cl
Molar mass	208.28 g·mol^{−1}
Appearance	Colorless liquid
Density	2.451 g mL^{−1}
Melting point	−22 °C (−8 °F; 251 K)
Boiling point	119 to 120 °C (246 to 248 °F; 392 to 393 K) at 99.7 kPa
log P	2.206
Henry's law constant (k_{H})	8.6 μmol Pa^{−1} kg^{−1}
Magnetic susceptibility (χ)	−75.1·10^{−6} cm^{3}/mol
Refractive index (n_{D})	1.547

Hazards
- GHS labelling
Pictograms	(GHS07: Exclamation mark)
Signal word	Warning
Hazard statements	H302
- Lethal dose or concentration (LD, LC)
LD_{50} (median dose)	370 mg kg^{−1} (oral, rat)

Related compounds
Related alkanes	Chloromethane; Chloroiodomethane; Bromochloromethane
Related compounds	2-Chloroethanol
- Except where otherwise noted, data are given for materials in their standard state (at 25 °C [77 °F], 100 kPa). verify (what is ?) Infobox references

Dibromochloromethane is a colorless to yellow, heavy and nonflammable compound with formula CHBr_{2}Cl. It is a trihalomethane. The substance has a sweet odour. Small quantities of dibromochloromethane are produced in ocean by algae.

== Applications ==
Dibromochloromethane was formerly used as a flame retardant and as an intermediate in chemicals manufacturing. Today it is used only as a laboratory reagent. Dibromochloromethane is also a disinfection byproduct, formed by the reaction of chlorine with natural organic matter and bromide ions in the raw water supply. As a result, it is commonly found in chlorinated drinking water. Also, it is able to reduce methane production in ruminants by 79 %

== See also ==
- Asparagopsis taxiformis
