= Bromotrichloromethane =

Names
- Preferred IUPAC name Bromo(trichloro)methane
- Other names Carbon bromotrichloride

Identifiers
CAS Number	75-62-7
3D model (JSmol)	Interactive image
ChemSpider	6143
ECHA InfoCard	100.000.806
EC Number	200-886-0
PubChem CID	6383
UNII	IKJ30QXM63
CompTox Dashboard (EPA)	DTXSID7023930
- InChI: InChI=1S/CBrCl3/c2-1(3,4)5 Key: XNNQFQFUQLJSQT-UHFFFAOYSA-N
- SMILES: C(Cl)(Cl)(Cl)Br

Properties
Chemical formula	CBrCl_{3}
Molar mass	198.27 g·mol^{−1}
Appearance	colorless liquid
Density	2.401 g/cm³
Melting point	21 °C (70 °F; 294 K)
Boiling point	105 °C (221 °F; 378 K)
Solubility in water	practically insoluble

Hazards
- GHS labelling
Pictograms	(GHS07: Exclamation mark)
Signal word	Warning
Flash point	32.6 °C

Related compounds
Related compounds	Bromodichloromethane; Tribromochloromethane
- Except where otherwise noted, data are given for materials in their standard state (at 25 °C [77 °F], 100 kPa). Infobox references

Bromotrichloromethane is a tetrahalomethane with the chemical formula CBrCl_{3}. This is a halomethane containing one bromine atom and three chlorine atoms. Bromotrichloromethane is a volatile, non-flammable, colorless liquid with a pungent odor that is practically insoluble in water but miscible with organic solvents.

== Synthesis ==
Bromotrichloromethane can be obtained by treating carbon tetrachloride with hydrogen bromide or aluminum bromide. It can also be obtained by reacting trichloromethane with bromine at 225 to 400 °C or potassium trichloroacetate with bromine at 120 °C.

Cl_{3}CCO_{2}K + Br_{2} → CBrCl_{3} + CO_{2} + KBr

== Uses ==
Bromotrichloromethane is used as a chain transfer agent for the radical polymerization of methacrylates and as a brominating agent.

It is used for the addition of Br-CCl_{3} across double bonds.
