= Bromochloromethane =

- Stereo, skeletal formula of bromochloromethane with all explicit hydrogens added

- Spacefill model of bromochloromethane

Names
- Preferred IUPAC name Bromo(chloro)methane
- Other names: Bromochloromethane; Borothene; Chlorobromomethane; Chloromethyl bromide; Halon 1011; Methylene bromochloride; Methyl chlorobromide; Monochloromonobromomethane; Chlorobromomethane; Fluorocarbon 1011

Identifiers
CAS Number	74-97-5
3D model (JSmol)	Interactive image
Abbreviations	BCM; CBM; UN 1887
Beilstein Reference	1730801
ChEBI	CHEBI:17194
ChEMBL	ChEMBL346918
ChemSpider	6093
ECHA InfoCard	100.000.752
EC Number	200-826-3
Gmelin Reference	25577
KEGG	C02661
MeSH	bromochloromethane
PubChem CID	6333
RTECS number	PA5250000
UNII	45WX84110G
UN number	1887
CompTox Dashboard (EPA)	DTXSID4021503
- InChI: InChI=1S/CH2BrCl/c2-1-3/h1H2 Key: JPOXNPPZZKNXOV-UHFFFAOYSA-N
- SMILES: ClCBr

Properties
Chemical formula	CH_{2}BrCl
Molar mass	129.38 g·mol^{−1}
Appearance	Colorless liquid
Odor	Chloroform-like
Density	1.991 g·mL^{−1}
Melting point	−88.0 °C; −126.3 °F; 185.2 K
Boiling point	68 °C; 154 °F; 341 K
Solubility in water	16.7 g·L^{−1}
log P	1.55
Vapor pressure	15.60 kPa (at 20.0 °C)
Magnetic susceptibility (χ)	−86.88·10^{−6}·cm^{3}/mol
Refractive index (n_{D})	1.482

Hazards
- GHS labelling
Pictograms	(GHS05: Corrosive) (GHS07: Exclamation mark)
Signal word	Danger
Hazard statements	H315, H318, H332, H335
Precautionary statements	P261, P280, P305+P351+P338
Flash point	Non-combustible
- Lethal dose or concentration (LD, LC)
LD_{50} (median dose)	5 g·mol^{−1} (oral, rat); 20 g·kg^{−1} (dermal, rabbit); 4300 mg·kg^{−1} (oral, mouse)
LC_{50} (median concentration)	3000 ppm (mouse, 7 hr)
LC_{Lo} (lowest published)	28,800 ppm (rat, 15 min); 29,000 ppm (rat, 15 min); 27,000 ppm (mouse, 15 min)
- NIOSH (US health exposure limits)
PEL (Permissible)	TWA 200 ppm (1050 mg/m^{3})
REL (Recommended)	TWA 200 ppm (1050 mg/m^{3})
IDLH (Immediate danger)	2000 ppm

Related compounds
Related alkanes	Chloromethane; Chloroiodomethane; Dibromochloromethane
Related compounds	2-Chloroethanol
- Except where otherwise noted, data are given for materials in their standard state (at 25 °C [77 °F], 100 kPa). verify (what is ?) Infobox references

Bromochloromethane or methylene bromochloride and Halon 1011 is a mixed halomethane. It is a heavy low-viscosity liquid with refractive index 1.4808.

Halon 1011 was invented for use in fire extinguishers in Germany during the mid-1940s, in an attempt to create a less toxic, more effective alternative to carbon tetrachloride. This was a concern in aircraft and tanks as carbon tetrachloride produced highly toxic by-products when discharged onto a fire. It was slightly less toxic, and used up until the late 1960s, being officially banned by the NFPA for use in fire extinguishers in 1969, as safer and more effective agents such as halon 1211 and 1301 were developed. Due to its ozone depletion potential its production was banned from January 1, 2002, at the Eleventh Meeting of the Parties for the Montreal Protocol on Substances that Deplete the Ozone Layer.

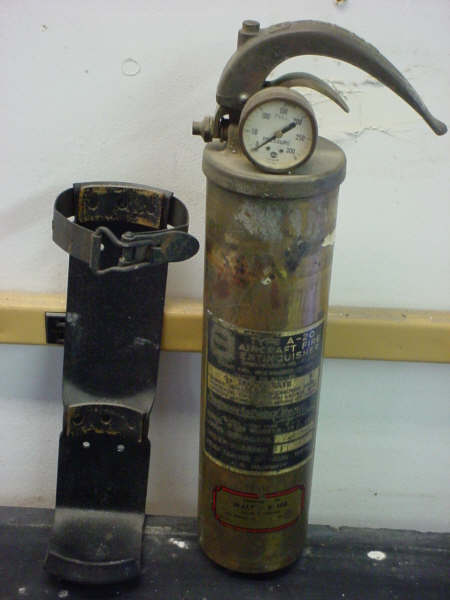
A 1950s US CBM fire extinguisher.

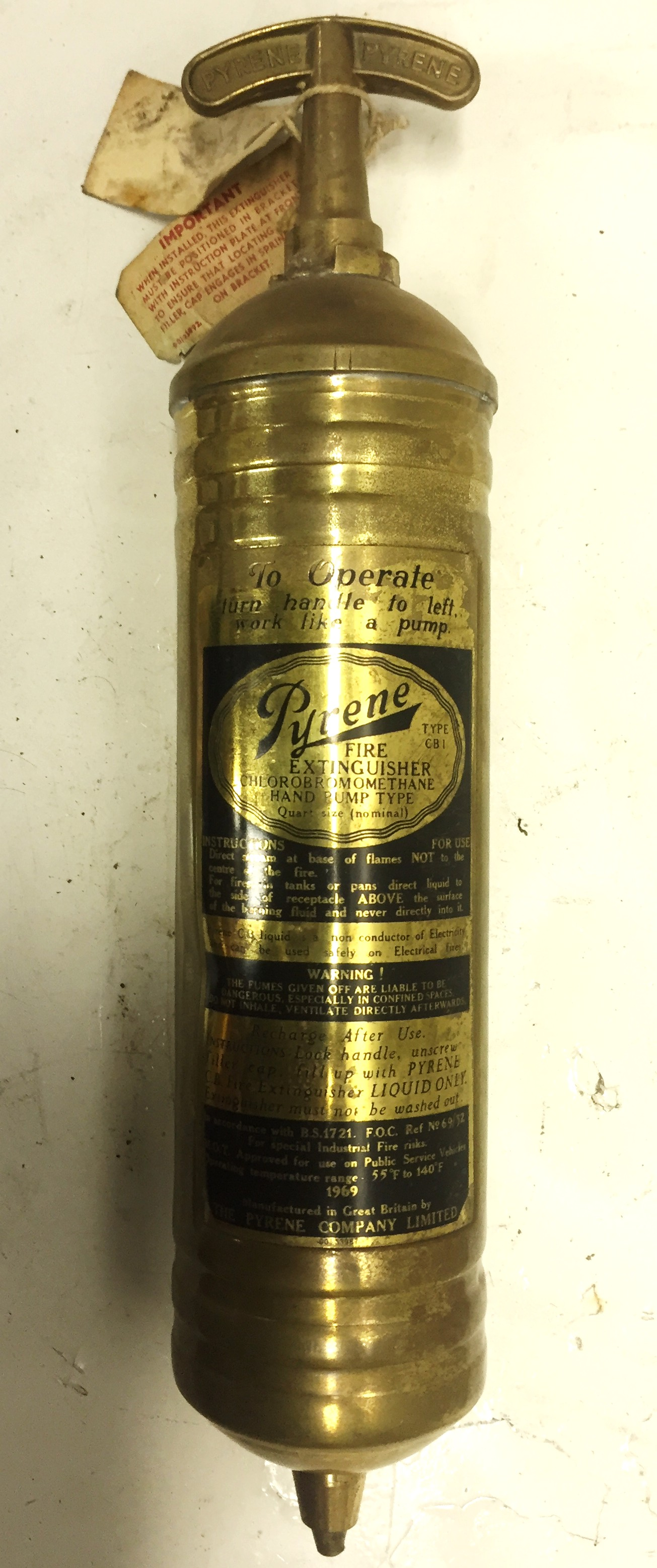
Pyrene 1qt. pump-type chlorobromomethane (CB or CBM), 1960s, UK

Bromochloromethane's biodegradation is catalyzed by the hydrolase enzyme alkylhalidase:

CH_{2}BrCl + H_{2}O → CH_{2}O + HBr + HCl

== Preparation ==
Bromochloromethane is prepared commercially from dichloromethane:

6 CH_{2}Cl_{2} + 3 Br_{2} + 2 Al → 6 CH_{2}BrCl + 2 AlCl_{3}
CH_{2}Cl_{2} + HBr → CH_{2}BrCl + HCl

The latter route requires aluminium trichloride as a catalyst. The bromochloromethane is often used as a precursor to methylene bromide.
