= Iodomethylzinc iodide =

Iodomethylzinc iodide is the active reagent in the Simmons–Smith reaction. For example, iodomethylzinc iodide, formed in situ from diiodomethane and a zinc-copper couple reacts with cyclohexene to give norcarane (bicyclo[4.1.0]heptane).

An example of the Simmons-Smith reaction

Iodomethylzinc iodide may also be generated by the reaction of diazomethane with zinc iodide, or by the reaction of methylene iodide with diethylzinc.
