= Dihalomethane =

The dihalomethanes are organic compounds in which two hydrogen atoms in methane are replaced by halogen atoms. They belong to the haloalkanes, specifically the subgroup of halomethanes, and contains ten members.

There are four members with only one kind of halogen atom: difluoromethane, dichloromethane, dibromomethane and diiodomethane.

Structural Formula				
Name	Difluoromethane	Dichloromethane	Dibromomethane	Diiodomethane
Melting point	−136 °C	−97 °C	−52 °C	6 °C
Boiling point	−51.7 °C	40 °C	97 °C	decomposes
Space-filling model				

There are six members with two kinds of halogen atoms:

- Bromochloromethane
- Bromofluoromethane
- Bromoiodomethane
- Chlorofluoromethane
- Chloroiodomethane
- Fluoroiodomethane

== See also ==
- Monohalomethane
- Tetrahalomethane – Class of chemical compounds
- Trihalomethane – Methane (CH4) derivative with 3 halogen substituents
