= DZO =

DZO is an abbreviation that may refer to:

- Depleted zinc oxide
- DZO, the IATA code for the Santa Bernardina International Airport
- Drive Zone Online
