= Gas centrifuge =

Device that performs isotope separation of gases

Diagram of a gas centrifuge with countercurrent flow, used for separating isotopes of uranium.

A gas centrifuge is a device that performs isotope separation of gases. A centrifuge relies on the principles of centrifugal force accelerating molecules so that particles of different masses are physically separated in a gradient along the radius of a rotating container.

A prominent use of gas centrifuges is for the separation of uranium-235 (^{235}U) from uranium-238 (^{238}U). The gas centrifuge was developed to replace the gaseous diffusion method of ^{235}U extraction. High degrees of separation of these isotopes relies on using many individual centrifuges arranged in series that achieve successively higher concentrations. This process yields higher concentrations of ^{235}U while using significantly less energy compared to the gaseous diffusion process.

== History ==
Suggested in 1919, the centrifugal process was first successfully performed in 1934. American scientist Jesse Beams and his team at the University of Virginia developed the process by separating two chlorine isotopes through a vacuum ultracentrifuge. It was one of the initial isotopic separation means pursued during the Manhattan Project, more particularly by Harold Urey and Karl P. Cohen, but research was discontinued in 1944 as it was felt that the method would not produce results by the end of the war, and that other means of uranium enrichment (gaseous diffusion and electromagnetic separation) had a better chance of success in the short term. This method was successfully used in the Soviet nuclear program, making the Soviet Union the most effective supplier of enriched uranium. Franz Simon, Rudolf Peierls, Klaus Fuchs and Nicholas Kurti made important contributions to the centrifugal process.

Paul Dirac made important theoretical contributions to the centrifugal process during World War II; Dirac developed the fundamental theory of separation processes that underlies the design and analysis of modern uranium enrichment plants. In the long term, especially with the development of the Zippe-type centrifuge, the gas centrifuge has become a very economical mode of separation, using considerably less energy than other methods and having numerous other advantages.

Research in the physical performance of centrifuges was carried out by the Pakistani scientist Abdul Qadeer Khan in the 1970s–80s, using vacuum methods and proper selection of materials for advancing the role of centrifuges in the development of nuclear fuel for Pakistan's atomic bomb. Many of the theorists working with Khan were unsure that either gaseous and enriched uranium would be feasible on time. One scientist recalled: "No one in the world has used the [gas] centrifuge method to produce military-grade uranium.... This was not going to work. He was simply wasting time." In spite of skepticism, the program was quickly proven to be feasible. Enrichment via centrifuge has been used in experimental physics, and the method was smuggled to at least three different countries by the end of the 20th century.

== Centrifugal process ==
The centrifuge relies on the force resulting from centrifugal acceleration to separate molecules according to their mass and can be applied to most fluids. The dense (heavier) molecules move towards the wall, and the lighter ones remain close to the center. The centrifuge consists of a rigid body rotor rotating at full period at high speed. Concentric gas tubes located on the axis of the rotor are used to introduce feed gas into the rotor and extract the heavier and lighter separated streams. For ^{235}U production, the heavier stream is the waste stream and the lighter stream is the product stream. Modern Zippe-type centrifuges are tall cylinders spinning on a vertical axis. A vertical temperature gradient can be applied to create a convective circulation rising in the center and descending at the periphery of the centrifuge. Such a countercurrent flow can also be stimulated mechanically by the scoops that take out the enriched and depleted fractions. Diffusion between these opposing flows increases the separation by the principle of countercurrent multiplication.

In practice, since there are limits to how tall a single centrifuge can be made, several such centrifuges are connected in series. Each centrifuge receives one input line and produces two output lines, corresponding to light and heavy fractions. The input of each centrifuge is the product stream of the previous centrifuge. This produces an almost pure light fraction from the product stream of the last centrifuge and an almost pure heavy fraction from the waste stream of the first centrifuge.

== Gas centrifugation process ==
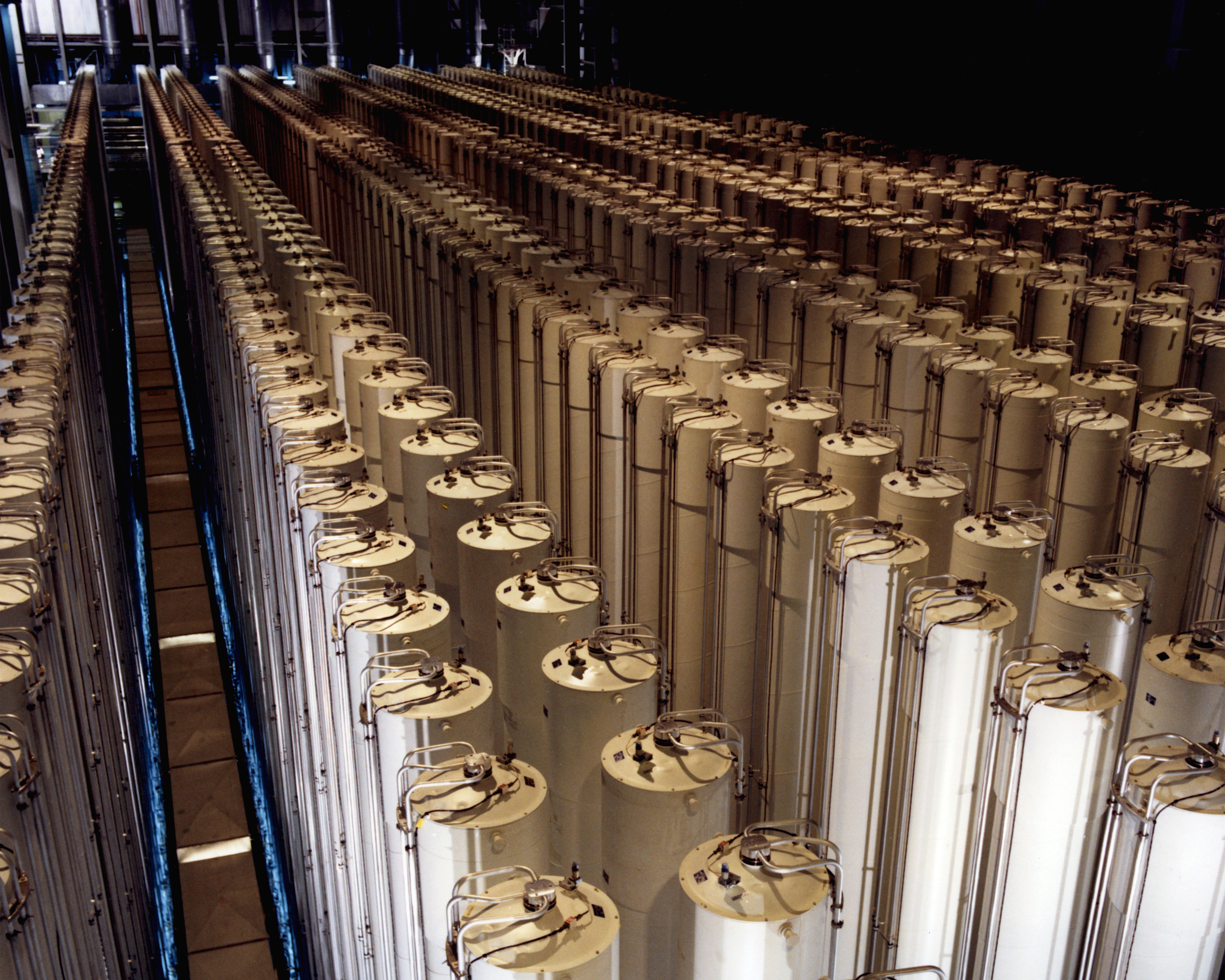
Cascade of gas centrifuges used to produce enriched uranium. U.S. gas centrifuge testbed in Piketon, Ohio, 1984. Each centrifuge is some 40 feet (12 m) tall. (Conventional centrifuges in use today are much smaller, less than 5 metres (16 ft) high.)

The gas centrifugation process uses a unique design that allows gas to constantly flow in and out of the centrifuge. Unlike most centrifuges which rely on batch processing, the gas centrifuge uses continuous processing, allowing cascading in which multiple identical processes occur in succession. The gas centrifuge consists of a cylindrical rotor, a casing, an electric motor, and three lines for material to travel. The gas centrifuge is designed with a casing that completely encloses the centrifuge. The cylindrical rotor is located inside the casing, which is evacuated of all air to produce a near frictionless rotation when operating. The motor spins the rotor, creating the centrifugal force on the components as they enter the cylindrical rotor. This force acts to separate the molecules of the gas, with heavier molecules moving towards the wall of the rotor and the lighter molecules towards the central axis. There are two output lines, one for the fraction enriched in the desired isotope (in uranium separation, this is ^{235}U), and one depleted of that isotope. The output lines take these separations to other centrifuges to continue the centrifugation process. The process begins when the rotor is balanced in three stages. Most of the technical details on gas centrifuges are difficult to obtain because they are shrouded in "nuclear secrecy".

The early gas centrifuges used in the UK used an alloy body wrapped in epoxy-impregnated glass fibre. Dynamic balancing of the assembly was accomplished by adding small traces of epoxy at the locations indicated by the balancing test unit. The motor was usually a pancake type located at the bottom of the cylinder. The early units were typically around 2 metres long, but subsequent developments gradually increased the length. The present generation are over 4 metres in length. The bearings are gas-based devices, as mechanical bearings would not survive at the normal operating speeds of these centrifuges.

A section of centrifuges would be fed with variable-frequency alternating current from an electronic (bulk) inverter, which would slowly ramp them up to the required speed, generally in excess of 50,000 rpm. One precaution was to quickly get past frequencies at which the cylinder was known to suffer resonance problems. The inverter is a high-frequency unit capable of operating at frequencies around 1 kilohertz. The whole process is normally silent; if a noise is heard coming from a centrifuge, it is a warning of failure (which normally occurs very quickly). The design of the cascade normally allows for the failure of at least one centrifuge unit without compromising the operation of the cascade. The units are normally very reliable, with early models having operated continuously for over 30 years.

Later models have steadily increased the rotation speed of the centrifuges, as it is the velocity of the centrifuge wall that has the most effect on the separation efficiency. A feature of the cascade system of centrifuges is that it is possible to increase plant throughput incrementally, by adding cascade "blocks" to the existing installation at suitable locations, rather than having to install a completely new line of centrifuges.

=== Concurrent and countercurrent centrifuges ===
The simplest gas centrifuge is the concurrent centrifuge, where separative effect is produced by the centrifugal effects of the rotor's rotation. In these centrifuges, the heavy fraction is collected at the periphery of the rotor and the light fraction from nearer the axis of rotation.

Inducing a countercurrent flow uses countercurrent multiplication to enhance the separative effect. A vertical circulating current is set up, with the gas flowing axially along the rotor walls in one direction and a return flow closer to the center of the rotor. The centrifugal separation continues as before (heavier molecules preferentially moving outwards), which means that the heavier molecules are collected by the wall flow, and the lighter fraction collects at the other end. In a centrifuge with downward wall flow, the heavier molecules collect at the bottom. The outlet scoops are then placed at the ends of the rotor cavity, with the feed mixture injected along the axis of the cavity (ideally, the injection point is at the point where the mixture in the rotor is equal to the feed).

This countercurrent flow can be induced mechanically or thermally, or a combination. In mechanically induced countercurrent flow, the arrangement of the (stationary) scoops and internal rotor structures are used to generate the flow. A scoop interacts with the gas by slowing it, which tends to draw it into the centre of the rotor. The scoops at each end induce opposing currents, so one scoop is protected from the flow by a "baffle": a perforated disc within the rotor which rotates along with the gas—at this end of the rotor, the flow will be outwards, towards the rotor wall. Thus, in a centrifuge with a baffled top scoop, the wall flow is downwards, and heavier molecules are collected at the bottom. Thermally induced convection currents can be created by heating the bottom of the centrifuge and/or cooling the top end.

=== Separative work units ===
The separative work unit (SWU) is a measure of the amount of work done by the centrifuge and has units of mass (typically kilogram separative work unit). The work $W_\mathrm{SWU}$ necessary to separate a mass $F$ of feed of assay $x_{f}$ into a mass $P$ of product assay $x_{p}$, and tails of mass $T$ and assay $x_{t}$ is expressed in terms of the number of separative work units needed, given by the expression

$$W_\mathrm{SWU} = P \cdot V\left(x_{p}\right)+T \cdot V(x_{t})-F \cdot V(x_{f})$$
where $V\left(x\right)$ is the value function, defined as
$$V(x) = (1 - 2x) \cdot \ln\left(\frac{1 - x}{x}\right)$$

=== Practical application of centrifugation ===
==== Separation of uranium-235 from uranium-238 ====
The separation of uranium requires the material in a gaseous form; uranium hexafluoride (UF_{6}) is used for uranium enrichment. Upon entering the centrifuge cylinder, the UF_{6} gas is rotated at a high speed. The rotation creates a strong centrifugal force that draws more of the heavier gas molecules (containing the ^{238}U) toward the wall of the cylinder, while the lighter gas molecules (containing the ^{235}U) tend to collect closer to the center. The stream that is slightly enriched in ^{235}U is withdrawn and fed into the next higher stage, while the slightly depleted stream is recycled back into the next lower stage.

==== Separation of zinc isotopes ====
For some uses in nuclear technology, the content of zinc-64 (^{64}Zn) in zinc metal has to be lowered in order to prevent formation of radioisotopes by its neutron activation. Diethyl zinc is used as the gaseous feed medium for the centrifuge cascade. An example of a resulting material is depleted zinc oxide, used as a corrosion inhibitor.

== See also ==
- Nuclear technology
- Nuclear power
- Nuclear fuel
