= Simmons–Smith reaction =

Chemical reaction

Simmons-Smith reaction
| Named after | Howard Ensign Simmons, Jr. Ronald D. Smith |
| Reaction type | Ring forming reaction |

Reaction
Organozinc carbenoid
+
Alkene/Alkyne
↓
Cyclopropane

Identifiers
| Organic Chemistry Portal | simmons-smith-reaction |
| RSC ontology ID | RXNO:0000258 |

The Simmons–Smith reaction is an organic cheletropic reaction involving an organozinc carbenoid that reacts with an alkene (or alkyne) to form a cyclopropane. It is named after Howard Ensign Simmons, Jr. and Ronald D. Smith. It uses a methylene free radical intermediate that is delivered to both carbons of the alkene simultaneously, therefore the configuration of the double bond is preserved in the product and the reaction is stereospecific.

== Examples ==
Thus, cyclohexene, diiodomethane, and a zinc-copper couple (as iodomethylzinc iodide, ICH_{2}ZnI) yield norcarane (bicyclo[4.1.0]heptane).

The Simmons–Smith reaction is generally preferred over other methods of cyclopropanation, however it can be expensive due to the high cost of diiodomethane. Modifications involving cheaper alternatives have been developed, such as dibromomethane or diazomethane and zinc iodide. The reactivity of the system can also be increased by using the Furukawa modification, exchanging the zinc‑copper couple for diethylzinc.

The Simmons–Smith reaction is generally subject to steric effects, and thus cyclopropanation usually takes place on the less hindered face. However, when a hydroxy substituent is present in the substrate in proximity to the double bond, the zinc coordinates with the hydroxy substituent, directing cyclopropanation cis to the hydroxyl group (which may not correspond to cyclopropanation of the sterically most accessible face of the double bond): An interactive 3D model of this reaction can be seen at ChemTube3D.

== Asymmetric Simmons–Smith reaction ==
Although asymmetric cyclopropanation methods based on diazo compounds (the metal-catalyzed cyclopropanations) have existed since 1966, the asymmetric Simmons–Smith reaction was introduced in 1992 with a reaction of cinnamyl alcohol with diethylzinc, diiodomethane and a chiral disulfonamide in dichloromethane:

The hydroxyl group is a prerequisite serving as an anchor for zinc. An interactive 3D model of a similar reaction can be seen here (java required). In another version of this reaction the ligand is based on salen and Lewis acid DIBAL is added:

== Scope and limitations ==
=== Achiral alkenes ===
The Simmons–Smith reaction can be used to cyclopropanate simple alkenes without complications. Unfunctionalized achiral alkenes are best cyclopropanated with the Furukawa modification (see below), using Et_{2}Zn and CH_{2}I_{2} in 1,2-dichloroethane. Cyclopropanation of alkenes activated by electron donating groups proceed rapidly and easily. For example, enol ethers like trimethylsilyloxy-substituted olefins are often used because of the high yields obtained.

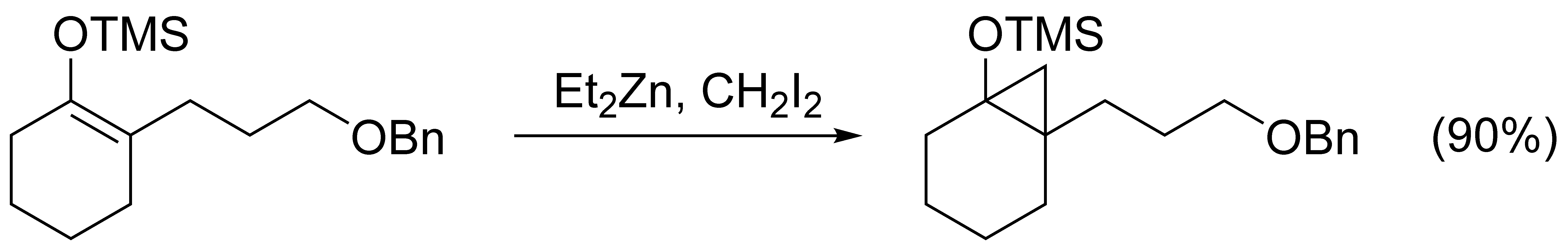

Despite the electron-withdrawing nature of halides, many vinyl halides are also easily cyclopropanated, yielding fluoro-, bromo-, and iodo-substituted cyclopropanes.

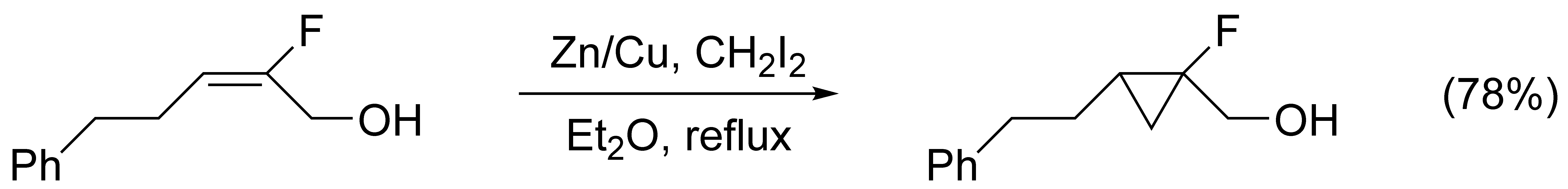

The cyclopropanation of N-substituted alkenes is made complicated by N-alkylation as a competing pathway. This can be circumvented by adding a protecting group to nitrogen, however the addition of electron-withdrawing groups decreases the nucleophilicity of the alkene, lowering yield. The use of highly electrophilic reagents such as fluorodiiodomethane (CHFI_{2}), in place of CH_{2}I_{2}, has been shown to increase yield in these cases.

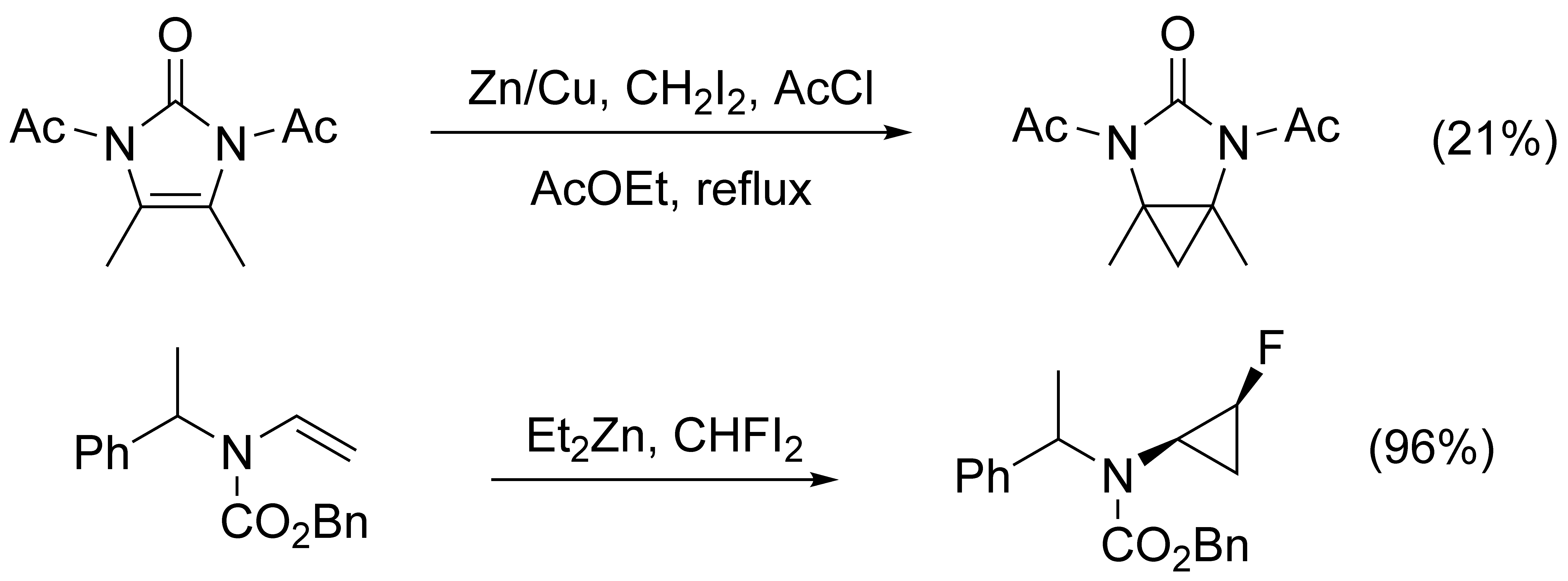

=== Polyenes ===
Without the presence of a directing group on the olefin, very little chemoselectivity is observed. However, an alkene which is significantly more nucleophilic than any others will be highly favored. For example, cyclopropanation occurs highly selectively at enol ethers.

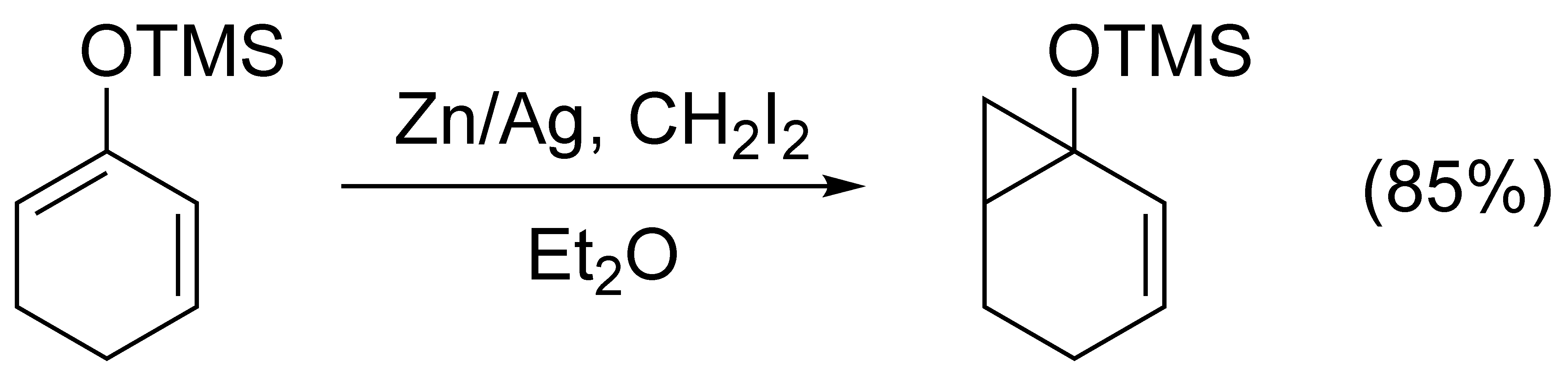

=== Functional group compatibility ===
An important aspect of the Simmons–Smith reaction that contributes to its wide usage is its ability to be used in the presence of many functional groups. Among others, the haloalkylzinc-mediated reaction is compatible with alkynes, alcohols, ethers, aldehydes, ketones, carboxylic acids and derivatives, carbonates, sulfones, sulfonates, silanes, and stannanes. However, some side reactions are commonly observed.

Most side reactions occur due to the Lewis-acidity of the byproduct, ZnI_{2}. In reactions that produce acid-sensitive products, excess Et_{2}Zn can be added to scavenge the ZnI_{2} that is formed, forming the less acidic EtZnI. The reaction can also be quenched with pyridine, which will scavenge ZnI_{2} and excess reagents.

Methylation of heteroatoms is also observed in the Simmons–Smith reaction due to the electrophilicity of the zinc carbenoids. For example, the use of excess reagent for long reaction times almost always leads to the methylation of alcohols. Furthermore, Et_{2}Zn and CH_{2}I_{2} react with allylic thioethers to generate sulfur ylides, which can subsequently undergo a 2,3-sigmatropic rearrangement, and will not cyclopropanate an alkene in the same molecule unless excess Simmons–Smith reagent is used.

== Modifications ==
The Simmons–Smith reaction is rarely used in it original form and a number of modifications to both the zinc reagent and carbenoid precursor have been developed and are more commonly employed.

=== Furukawa modification ===
The Furukawa modification involves the replacement of the zinc-copper couple with dialkyl zinc, the most active of which was found to be Et_{2}Zn. The modification was proposed in 1968 as a way to turn cationically polymerizable olefins such as vinyl ethers into their respective cyclopropanes. It has also been found to be especially useful for the cyclopropanation of carbohydrates, being far more reproducible than other methods. Like the unmodified reaction, the Furukawa-modified reaction is stereospecific, and is often much faster than the unmodified reaction. However, the Et_{2}Zn reagent is pyrophoric, and as such must be handled with care.

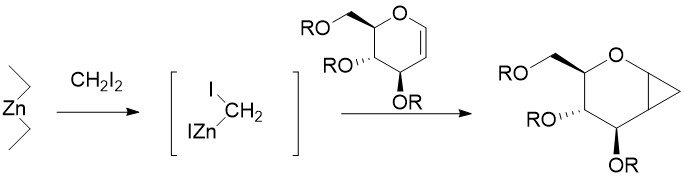

=== Charette modification ===
The Charette modification replaces the CH_{2}I_{2} normally found in the Simmons–Smith reaction with aryldiazo compounds, such as phenyldiazomethane, in Pathway A. Upon treatment with stoichiometric amounts of zinc halide, an organozinc compound similar to the carbenoid discussed above is produced. This can react with almost all alkenes and alkynes, including styrenes and alcohols. This is especially useful, as the unmodified Simmons-Smith is known to deprotonate alcohols. Unfortunately, as in Pathway B shown the intermediate can also react with the starting diazo compound, giving cis- or trans- 1,2-diphenylethene. Additionally, the intermediate can react with alcohols to produce iodophenylmethane, which can further undergo an S_{N}2 reaction to produce ROCHPh, as in Pathway C.

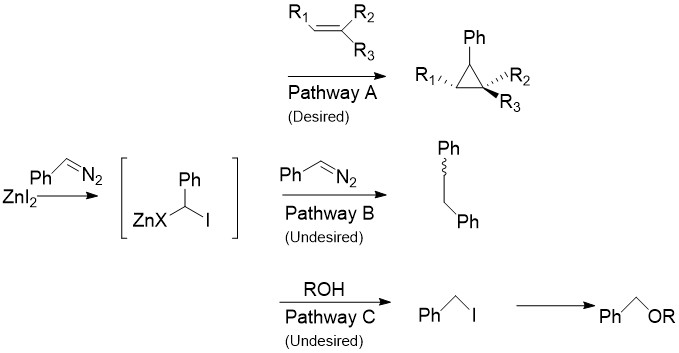

=== Shi Modification ===
The highly electrophilic nature of the zinc carbenoid reduces the useful scope of the Simmons-Smith cyclopropanation to electron-rich alkenes and those bearing pendant coordinating groups, most commonly alcohols. In 1998, the Shi group identified a novel zinc carbenoid formed from diethylzinc, trifluoroacetic acid and diiodomethane of the form CF_{3}CO_{2}ZnCH_{2}I. This zinc carbenoid is far more nucleophilic and allows for reaction with unfunctionalized and electron-deficient alkenes, like vinyl boronates. A number of acidic modifiers have a similar effect, but trifluoroacetic acid is the most commonly used. The Shi modification of the cyclopropanation is also stereospecific. Further exploration of amino acids led to the development of an asymmetric variant of this cyclopropanation.

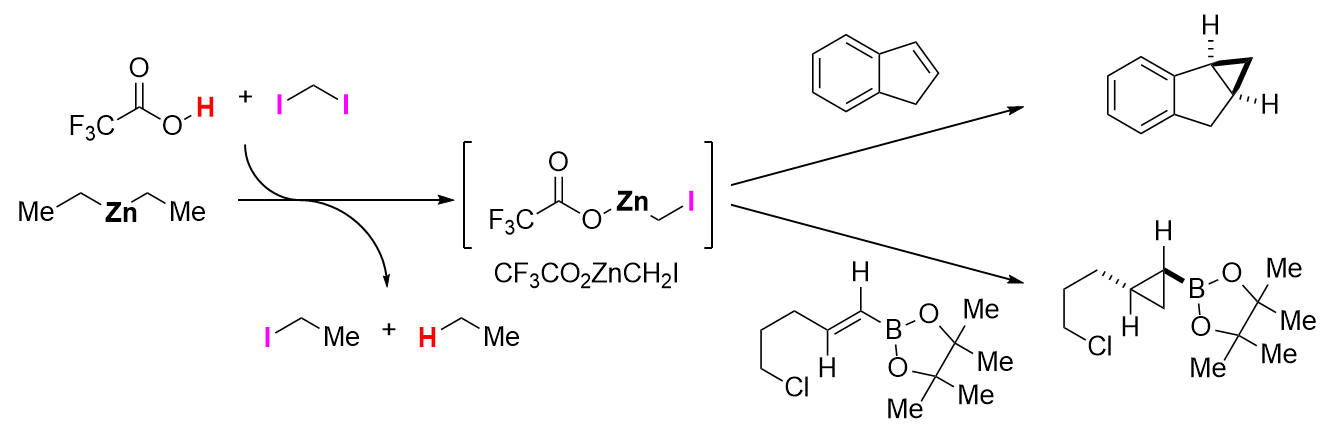

=== Non-zinc reagents ===
Although not commonly used, Simmons-Smith reagents that display similar reactive properties to those of zinc have been prepared from aluminum and samarium compounds in the presence of CH_{2}IX. With the use of these reagents, allylic alcohols and isolated olefins can be selectively cyclopropanated in the presence of each other. Iodo- or chloro- methylsamarium iodide in THF is an excellent reagent to selectively cyclopropanate the allylic alcohol, presumably directed by chelation to the hydroxyl group. In contrast, use of dialkyl(iodomethyl)aluminum reagents in CH_{2}Cl_{2} will selectively cyclopropanate the isolated olefin. The specificity of these reagents allow cyclopropanes to be placed in poly-unsaturated systems that zinc-based reagents will cyclopropanate fully and unselectively. For example, i-Bu_{3}Al will cyclopropanate geraniol at the 6 position, while Sm/Hg, will cyclopropanate at the 2 position, as shown below.

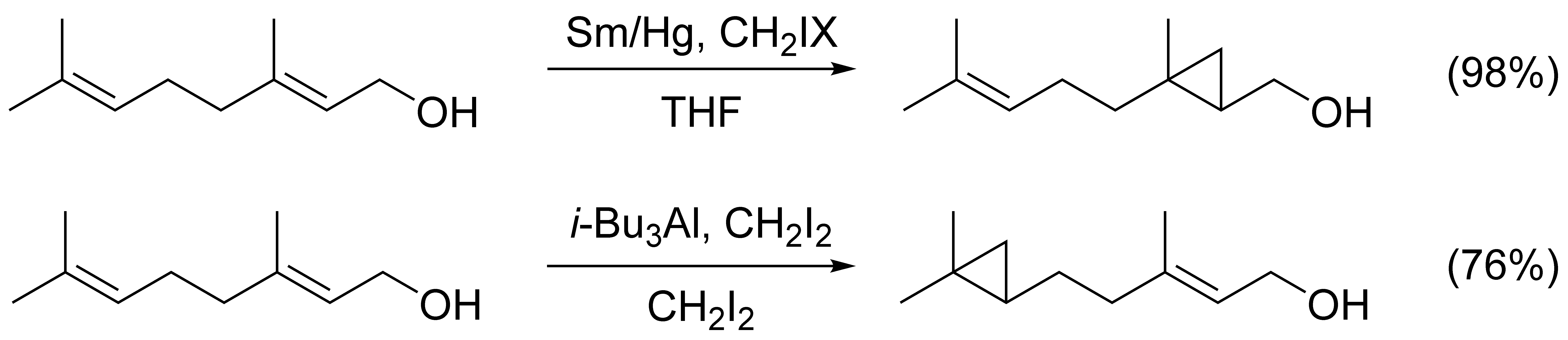

However, both reactions require near stoichiometric amounts of the starting metal compound, and Sm/Hg must be activated with the highly toxic HgCl_{2}.

== Uses in synthesis ==
Most modern applications of the Simmons–Smith reaction use the Furukawa modification. Especially relevant and reliable applications are listed below.

=== Insertion to form γ-keto esters ===
A Furukawa-modified Simmons-Smith generated cyclopropane intermediate is formed in the synthesis of γ-keto esters from β-keto esters. The Simmons-Smith reagent binds first to the carbonyl group and subsequently to the α-carbon of the pseudo-enol that the first reaction forms. This second reagent forms the cyclopropyl intermediate which rapidly fragments into the product.

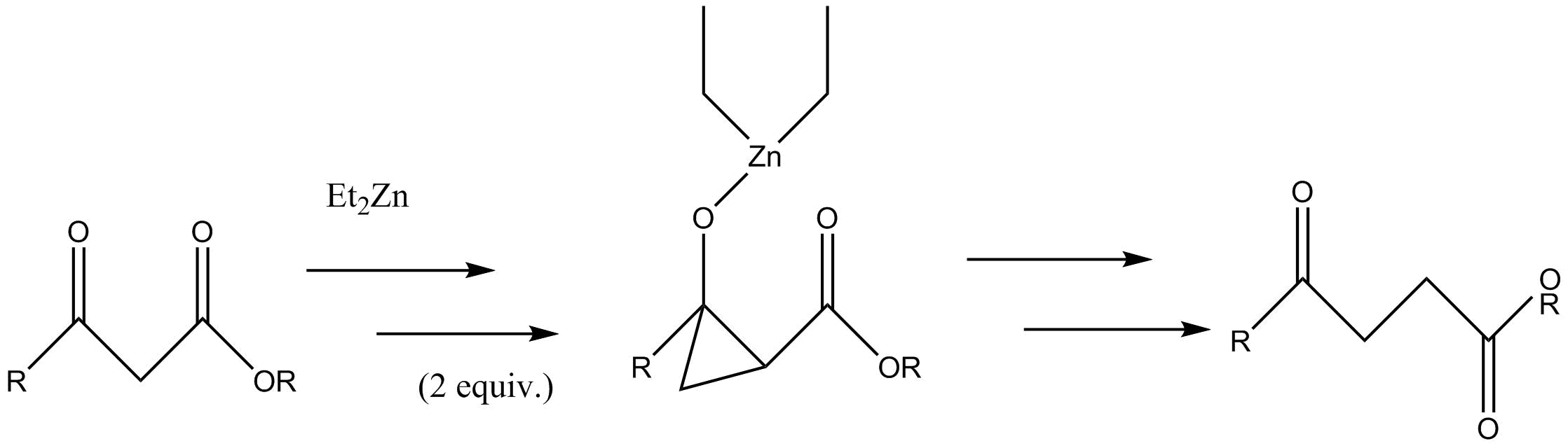

=== Formation of amido-spiro [2.2] pentanes from allenamides ===
A Furukawa-modified Simmons–Smith reaction cyclopropanates both double bonds in an allenamide to form amido-spiro [2.2] cyclopentanes, featuring two cyclopropyl rings which share one carbon. The product of monocyclopropanation is also formed.

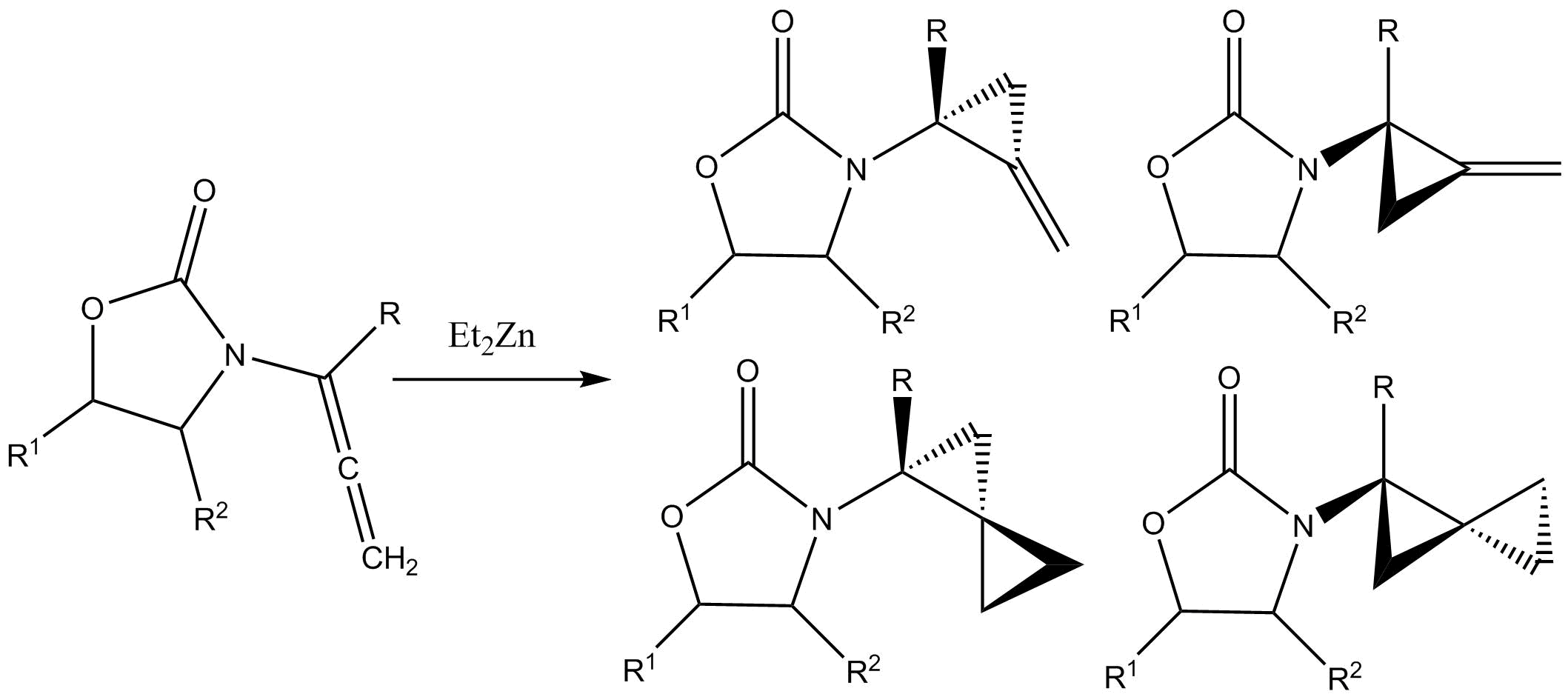

=== Natural product synthesis ===
Cyclopropanation reactions in natural products synthesis have been reviewed. The β-lactamase inhibitor Cilastatin provides an instructive example of Simmons-Smith reactivity in natural products synthesis. An allyl substituent on the starting material is Simmons-Smith cyclopropanated, and the carboxylic acid is subsequently deprotected via ozonolysis to form the precursor.

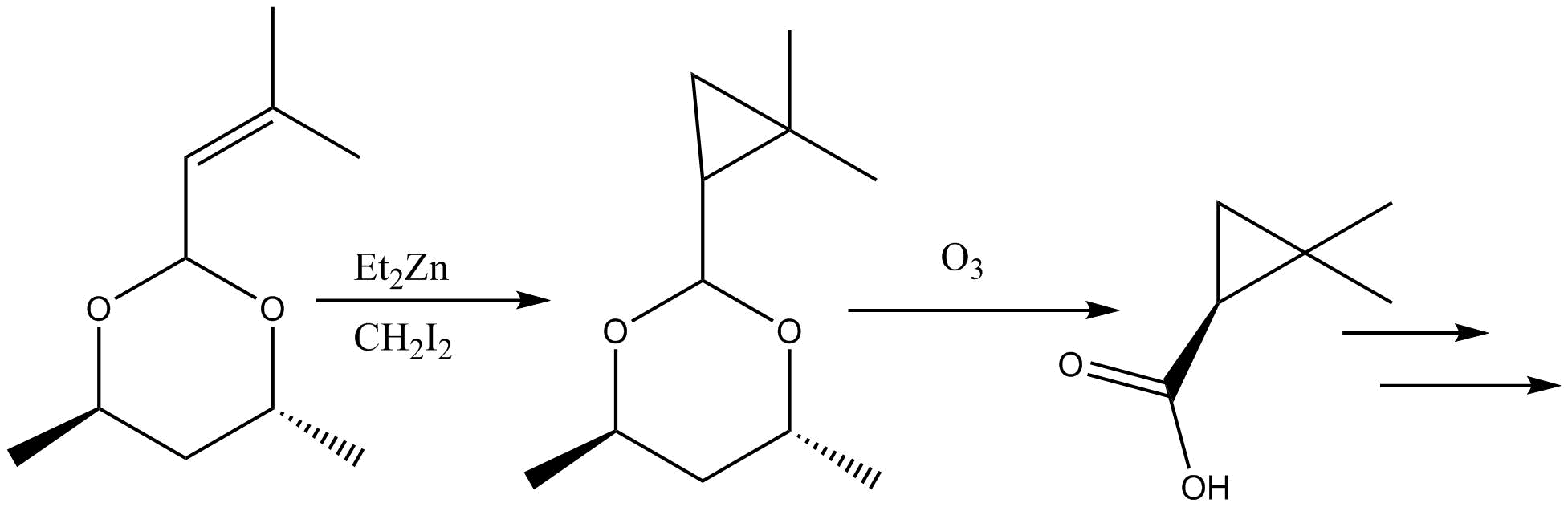
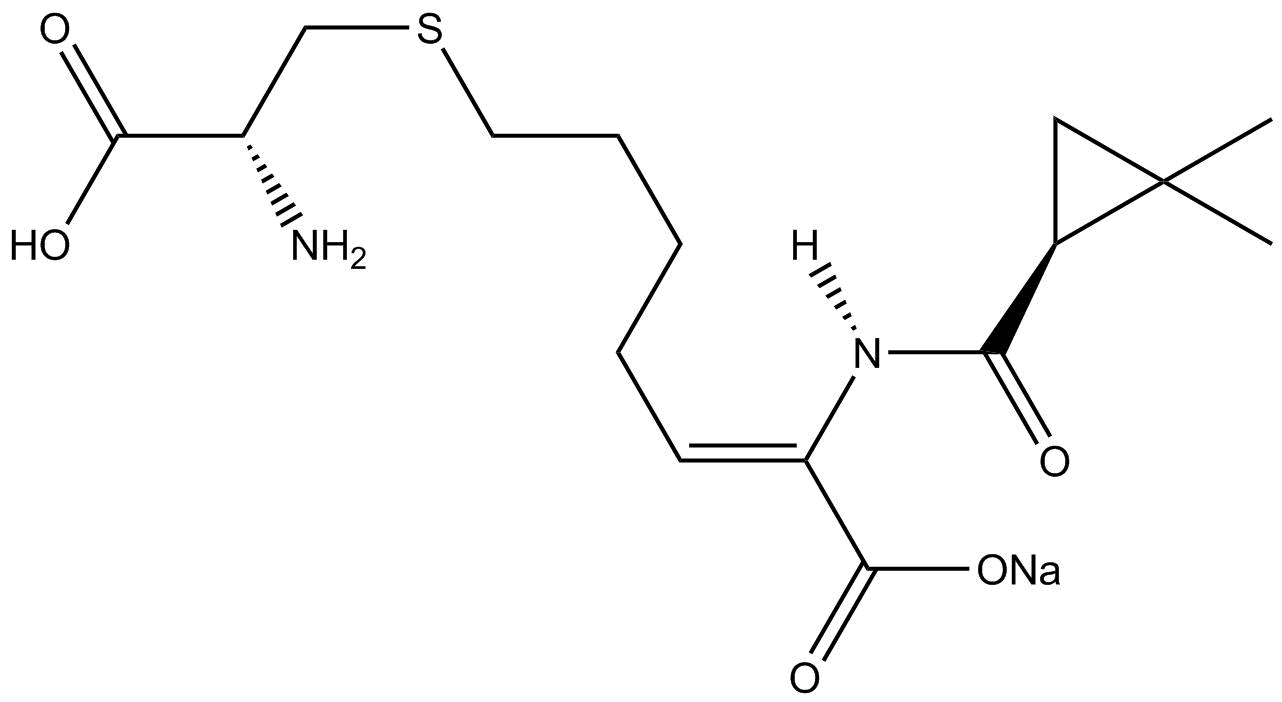

=== Pharmaceutical Synthesis ===
The Simmons–Smith reaction is used in the syntheses of GSK1360707F, ropanicant and Onglyza (Saxagliptan).
