= Norcarane =

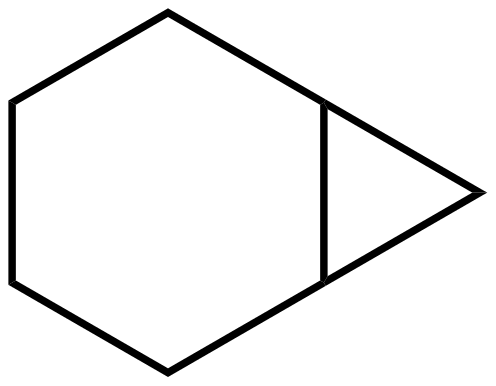

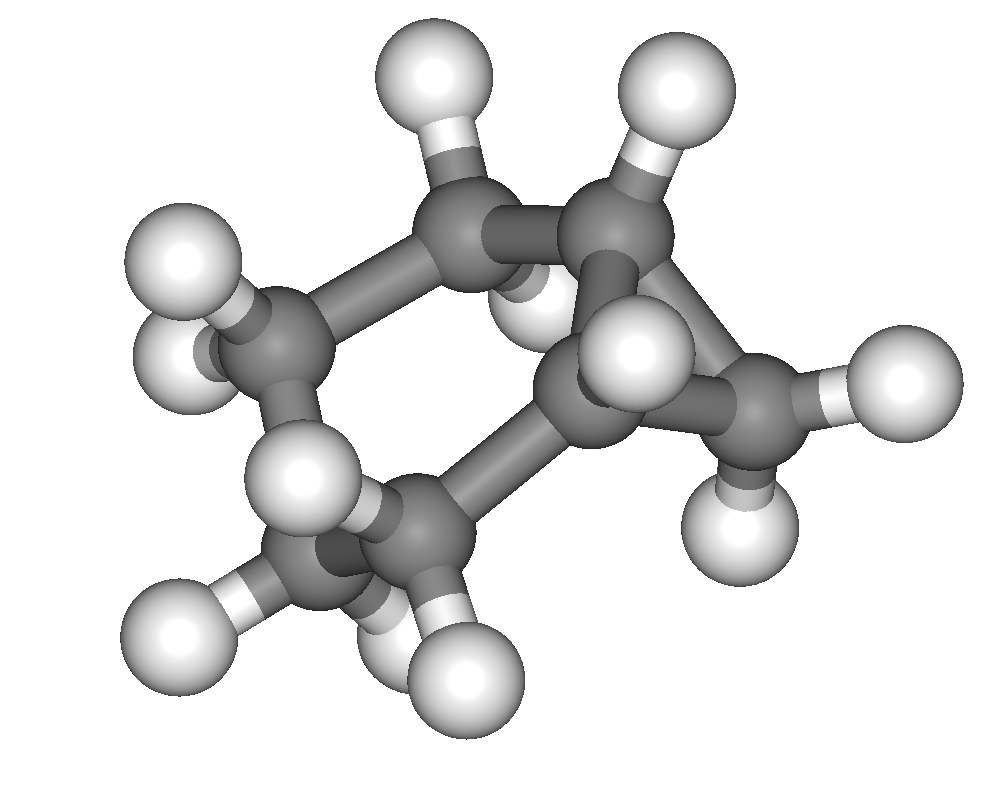

Names
- Preferred IUPAC name Bicyclo[4.1.0]heptane

Identifiers
CAS Number	286-08-8
3D model (JSmol)	Interactive image
ChemSpider	8889
PubChem CID	9245
UNII	ZGC3T0R48Q
CompTox Dashboard (EPA)	DTXSID10870493
- InChI: InChI=1S/C7H12/c1-2-4-7-5-6(7)3-1/h6-7H,1-5H2 Key: WPHGSKGZRAQSGP-UHFFFAOYSA-N; InChI=1/C7H12/c1-2-4-7-5-6(7)3-1/h6-7H,1-5H2 Key: WPHGSKGZRAQSGP-UHFFFAOYAG
- SMILES: C1C2CCCCC12

Properties
Chemical formula	C_{7}H_{12}
Molar mass	96.173 g·mol^{−1}
Density	0.914 g/ml
Boiling point	116 to 117 °C (241 to 243 °F; 389 to 390 K)
- Except where otherwise noted, data are given for materials in their standard state (at 25 °C [77 °F], 100 kPa). verify (what is ?) Infobox references

Norcarane, or bicyclo[4.1.0]heptane, is a colorless liquid. It is an organic compound prepared using the Simmons–Smith reaction, by the action of diiodomethane and a zinc-copper couple on cyclohexene in diethyl ether.

An example of the Simmons-Smith reaction
