= Fluoroiodomethane =

Names
- Preferred IUPAC name Fluoro(iodo)methane
- Other names Fluoroiodomethane; Fluoro-iodo-methane; Fluoromethyl iodide

Identifiers
CAS Number	373-53-5
3D model (JSmol)	Interactive image
ChemSpider	10329326
ECHA InfoCard	100.201.539
PubChem CID	13981373
UNII	F4DZ382EN9
CompTox Dashboard (EPA)	DTXSID00553763
- InChI: InChI=1S/CH2FI/c2-1-3/h1H2 Key: XGVXNTVBGYLJIR-UHFFFAOYSA-N; InChI=1/CH2FI/c2-1-3/h1H2
- SMILES: FCI

Properties
Chemical formula	CH_{2}FI
Molar mass	159.93 g/mol
Boiling point	53.4 °C (128.1 °F; 326.5 K)

Hazards
- GHS labelling
Pictograms	(GHS06: Toxic)
Signal word	Danger
Hazard statements	H301, H311, H330
Precautionary statements	P260, P264, P270, P271, P280, P284, P301+P310, P302+P352, P304+P340, P310, P312, P320, P321, P330, P361, P363, P403+P233, P405, P501
- Except where otherwise noted, data are given for materials in their standard state (at 25 °C [77 °F], 100 kPa). verify (what is ?) Infobox references

Fluoroiodomethane is the halomethane with the formula FCH_{2}I. Also classified as a fluoroiodocarbon (FIC), it is a colorless liquid. It is a reagent for the introduction of the fluoromethyl (FCH_{2}) group.

== Synthesis and uses ==
It is prepared by fluorination of methylene iodide.

Its isotopomer [^{18}F]fluoroiodomethane is used for fluoromethylation of radiopharmaceuticals.

== Additional reading ==
- Zheng L.; Berridge M. S. (January 2000). "Synthesis of [^{18}F]fluoromethyl iodide, a synthetic precursor for fluoromethylation of radiopharmaceuticals". Applied Radiation and Isotopes. 52 (1): 55–61(7). doi:10.1016/S0969-8043(99)00061-5. PMID 10670923.
- Chin F. T.; Morse Ch. L.; Shetty H. U.; Pike V. W. (December 2005). "Automated radiosynthesis of [18F]SPA-RQ for imaging human brain NK1 receptors with PET". Journal of Labelled Compounds and Radiopharmaceuticals. 49 (1): 17–31(15). doi:10.1002/jlcr.1016.
- Tedder, J. M.; Sloan, J. P.; Walton, J. C. (1975). "Free Radical Addition to Olefins, Part XVII. Addition of Fluoroiodomethane to Fluoroethylenes". Journal of the Chemical Society: 1846–1850.
