= Dibromofluoromethane (data page) =

Chemical data page

This page provides supplementary chemical data on dibromofluoromethane.

== Material Safety Data Sheet ==
The handling of this chemical may incur notable safety precautions. It is highly recommend that you seek the Material Safety Datasheet (MSDS) for this chemical from a reliable source such as SIRI, and follow its directions.

== Structure and properties ==
Structure and properties
Index of refraction, n_{D}	1.4685 at 20 °C
Abbe number	?
Dielectric constant, ε_{r}	? ε_{0} at ? °C
Bond strength	?
Bond length	?
Bond angle	?
Magnetic susceptibility	?

== Thermodynamic properties ==
Phase behavior
Triple point	? K (? °C), ? Pa
Critical point	? K (? °C), ? Pa
Std enthalpy change of fusion, Δ_{fus}H^{~~o~~}	? kJ/mol
Std entropy change of fusion, Δ_{fus}S^{~~o~~}	? J/(mol·K)
Std enthalpy change of vaporization, Δ_{vap}H^{~~o~~}	? kJ/mol
Std entropy change of vaporization, Δ_{vap}S^{~~o~~}	? J/(mol·K)
Solid properties
Std enthalpy change of formation, Δ_{f}H^{~~o~~}_{solid}	? kJ/mol
Standard molar entropy, S^{~~o~~}_{solid}	? J/(mol K)
Heat capacity, c_{p}	? J/(mol K)
Liquid properties
Std enthalpy change of formation, Δ_{f}H^{~~o~~}_{liquid}	? kJ/mol
Standard molar entropy, S^{~~o~~}_{liquid}	? J/(mol K)
Heat capacity, c_{p}	? J/(mol K)
Gas properties
Std enthalpy change of formation, Δ_{f}H^{~~o~~}_{gas}	? kJ/mol
Standard molar entropy, S^{~~o~~}_{gas}	316.8 J/(mol K)
Heat capacity, c_{p}	65.1 J/(mol K)

== Spectral data ==
UV-Vis
λ_{max}	? nm
Extinction coefficient, ε	?
IR
Major absorption bands	? cm^{−1}
NMR
Proton NMR
Carbon-13 NMR
Other NMR data
MS
Masses of main fragments	41, 43, 110, 113, 192
