= Fluorodiiodomethane =

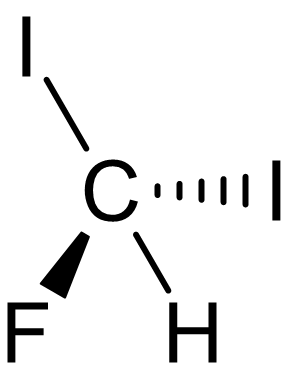

Names
- Preferred IUPAC name Fluoro(diiodo)methane
- Other names Diiodofluoromethane

Identifiers
CAS Number	1493-01-2
3D model (JSmol)	Interactive image
ChemSpider	9996877
PubChem CID	11822226
UNII	2GD4JG7JL9
CompTox Dashboard (EPA)	DTXSID70473843
- InChI: InChI=1S/CHFI2/c2-1(3)4/h1H Key: RIHYOLCRHKZJPJ-UHFFFAOYSA-N
- SMILES: C(F)(I)I

Properties
Chemical formula	CHFI_{2}
Molar mass	285.826 g·mol^{−1}
Density	3.2±0.1 g/cm³
Melting point	−31 to −35 °C (−24 to −31 °F; 242 to 238 K)
Boiling point	134 °C (273 °F; 407 K)

Hazards
- GHS labelling
Pictograms	(GHS07: Exclamation mark)
Signal word	Warning
Hazard statements	H302, H315, H319
Flash point	43.4±5.6 °C
- Except where otherwise noted, data are given for materials in their standard state (at 25 °C [77 °F], 100 kPa). Infobox references

Fluorodiiodomethane is a trihalomethane with the chemical formula CHFI_{2}.

== Synthesis ==
Fluorodiiodomethane can be obtained by the Finkenstein reaction of dibromofluoromethane with sodium iodide in acetone.

Also, iodoform reacts with mercuric fluoride at 120 °C to afford fluorodiiodomethane after distillation. This reaction is used to prepare large quantities of the reagent.

== Chemical properties ==
It is a highly efficient precursor of fluorocarbenes. The compound can generate fluorocarbenes that react with alkenes to give compounds containing fluorinated three-membered rings.

It is also a reagent for monofluorocyclopropanation.
