= Diethylzinc =

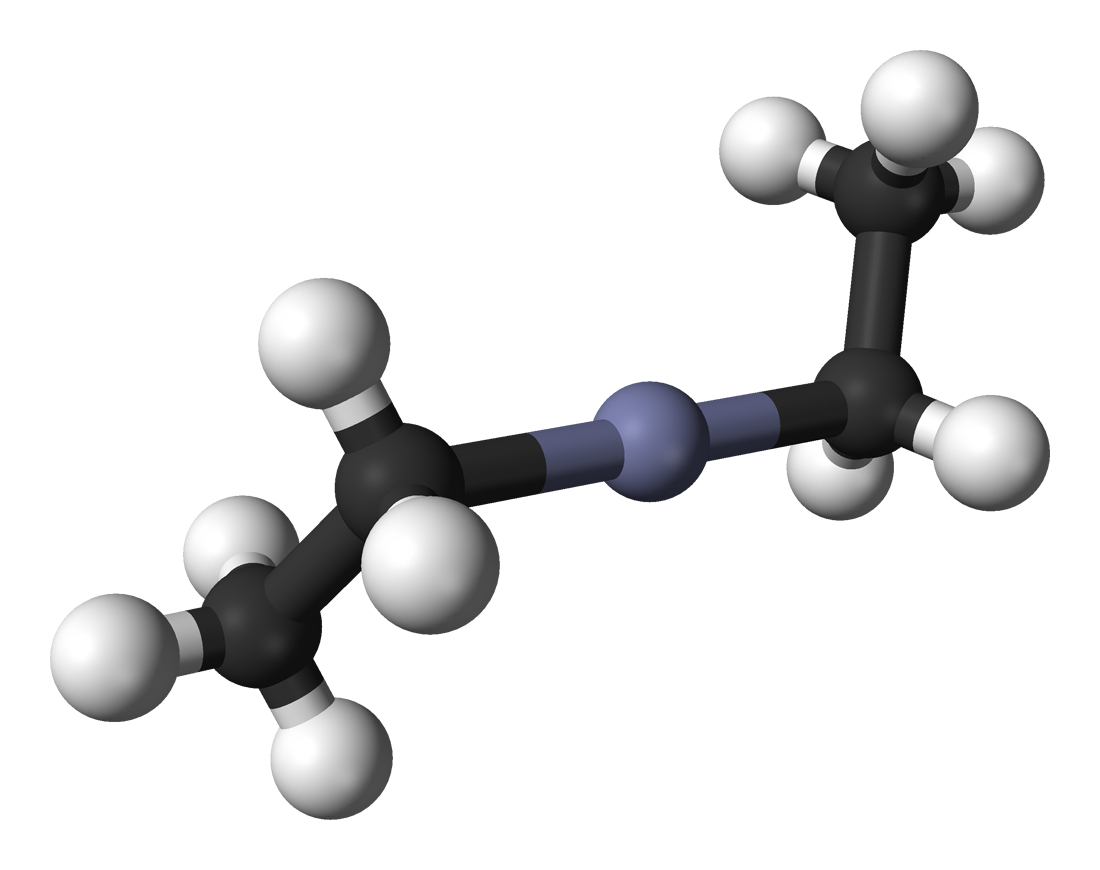

Names
- IUPAC name diethylzinc

Identifiers
CAS Number	557-20-0
3D model (JSmol)	Interactive image
Abbreviations	DEZ; Et_{2}Zn
ChEBI	CHEBI:51496
ChemSpider	10413128
ECHA InfoCard	100.008.330
EC Number	209-161-3
PubChem CID	11185
UNII	S0W5NQH7C6
UN number	1366
CompTox Dashboard (EPA)	DTXSID4052217
- InChI: InChI=1S/2C2H5.Zn/c2*1-2;/h2*1H2,2H3; Key: HQWPLXHWEZZGKY-UHFFFAOYSA-N; InChI=1/2C2H5.Zn/c2*1-2;/h2*1H2,2H3;/rC4H10Zn/c1-3-5-4-2/h3-4H2,1-2H3 Key: HQWPLXHWEZZGKY-GFXTWEBUAS
- SMILES: CC[Zn]CC

Properties
Chemical formula	C_{4}H_{10}Zn
Molar mass	123.50 g·mol^{−1}
Appearance	colourless liquid
Density	1.205 g/mL
Melting point	−28 °C (−18 °F; 245 K)
Boiling point	117 °C (243 °F; 390 K)
Solubility in water	Reacts

Hazards
- Occupational safety and health (OHS/OSH)
Main hazards	Flammable and corrosive liquid, pyrophoric in air, may explode in contact with water.
- GHS labelling
Pictograms	(GHS02: Flammable) (GHS05: Corrosive) (GHS09: Environmental hazard)
Signal word	Danger
Hazard statements	H225, H250, H260, H302+H312+H332, H314, H410
Precautionary statements	P210, P222, P223, P231+P232, P233, P240, P241, P242, P243, P260, P264, P273, P280, P301+P330+P331, P302+P334, P303+P361+P353, P304+P340, P305+P351+P338, P310, P321, P335+P334, P363, P370+P378, P391, P402+P404, P403+P235, P405, P422, P501
NFPA 704 (fire diamond)	1 4 3 W
Safety data sheet (SDS)	External MSDS

Related compounds
Related compounds	Dimethylzinc; Diphenylzinc; Diethylcadmium; Diethylmercury
- Except where otherwise noted, data are given for materials in their standard state (at 25 °C [77 °F], 100 kPa). verify (what is ?) Infobox references

Diethylzinc, or DEZ, is an organozinc compound with the chemical formula Zn(CH_{2}CH_{3})_{2}. It is highly pyrophoric and reactive, consisting of a zinc center bound to two ethyl groups. This colourless liquid is an important reagent in organic chemistry. It is available commercially as a solution in hexanes, heptane, or toluene, or as a pure liquid.

== Synthesis ==
Edward Frankland first reported the compound in 1848 from zinc and ethyl iodide, the first organozinc compound discovered. He improved the synthesis by using diethyl mercury as starting material. The contemporary synthesis consists of the reaction of a 1:1 mixture of ethyl iodide and ethyl bromide with a zinc-copper couple, a source of reactive zinc.

== Structure ==
The compound crystallizes in a tetragonal body-centered unit cell of space group symmetry I4_{1}md. In the solid-state diethylzinc shows nearly linear Zn centres. The Zn-C bonds measure 194.8(5) pm, while the C-Zn-C angle is slightly bent with 176.2(4)°. The structure of the gas-phase shows a very similar Zn-C distance (195.0(2) pm).

== Uses ==
Despite its highly pyrophoric nature, diethylzinc is an important chemical reagent. It is used in organic synthesis as a source of the ethyl carbanion in addition reactions to carbonyl groups. For example, the asymmetric addition of an ethyl group to benzaldehyde and imines. Additionally, it is commonly used in combination with diiodomethane as a Simmons-Smith reagent to convert alkenes into cyclopropyl groups. It is less nucleophilic than related alkyllithium and Grignard reagents, so it may be used when a "softer" nucleophile is needed. It is also used extensively in materials science chemistry as a zinc source in the synthesis of nanoparticles, particularly in the formation of the zinc sulfide shell for core/shell-type quantum dots. While in polymer chemistry, it can be used as part of the catalyst for a chain shuttling polymerization reaction, whereby it participates in living polymerization.

Diethylzinc is not limited to only being used in chemical synthesis processes. Because of its high reactivity toward air, it was used in small quantities as a hypergolic or "self igniting" liquid rocket fuel—it ignites on contact with oxidizer, so the rocket motor need only contain a pump, without a spark source for ignition. Diethylzinc was also investigated by the United States Library of Congress as a potential means of mass deacidification of books printed on wood pulp paper. Diethylzinc vapour would, in theory, neutralize acid residues in the paper, leaving slightly alkaline zinc oxide residues. Although initial results were promising, the project was abandoned. A variety of adverse results prevented the method's adoption. The final prototype suffered damage in a series of diethylzinc explosions from trace amounts of water vapor in the chamber. This led the authors of the study to comment:

It has also been established that tight or loose packing of books; the amount of alkaline reserve; reactions of DEZ with degradation products, unknown paper chemicals and adhesives; phases of the moon and the positions of various planets and constellations do not have any influence on the observed adverse effects of DEZ treatment.

In microelectronics, diethylzinc is used as a doping agent.

For corrosion protection in nuclear reactors of the light water reactor design, depleted zinc oxide is produced by first passing diethylzinc through an enrichment centrifuge.

The pyrophoricity of diethylzinc can be used to test the inert atmosphere inside a glovebox. An oxygen concentration of only a few parts per million will cause a bottle of diethylzinc to fume when opened.

== Safety ==
Pure liquid diethyl zinc is pyrophoric, as are most commercial concentrations of organic solutions of the reagent, and thus they will ignite spontaneously on contact with many chemicals, including the moisture and oxygen in air. The reagent and its solutions are therefore handled using air-free techniques at bench/laboratory scales, with even greater precautions required at larger scales. Diethylzinc has a Special Hazard in its NFPA 407 Diamond noting that it reacts violently or explosively with water.
