= Howard Ensign Simmons Jr. =

American chemist

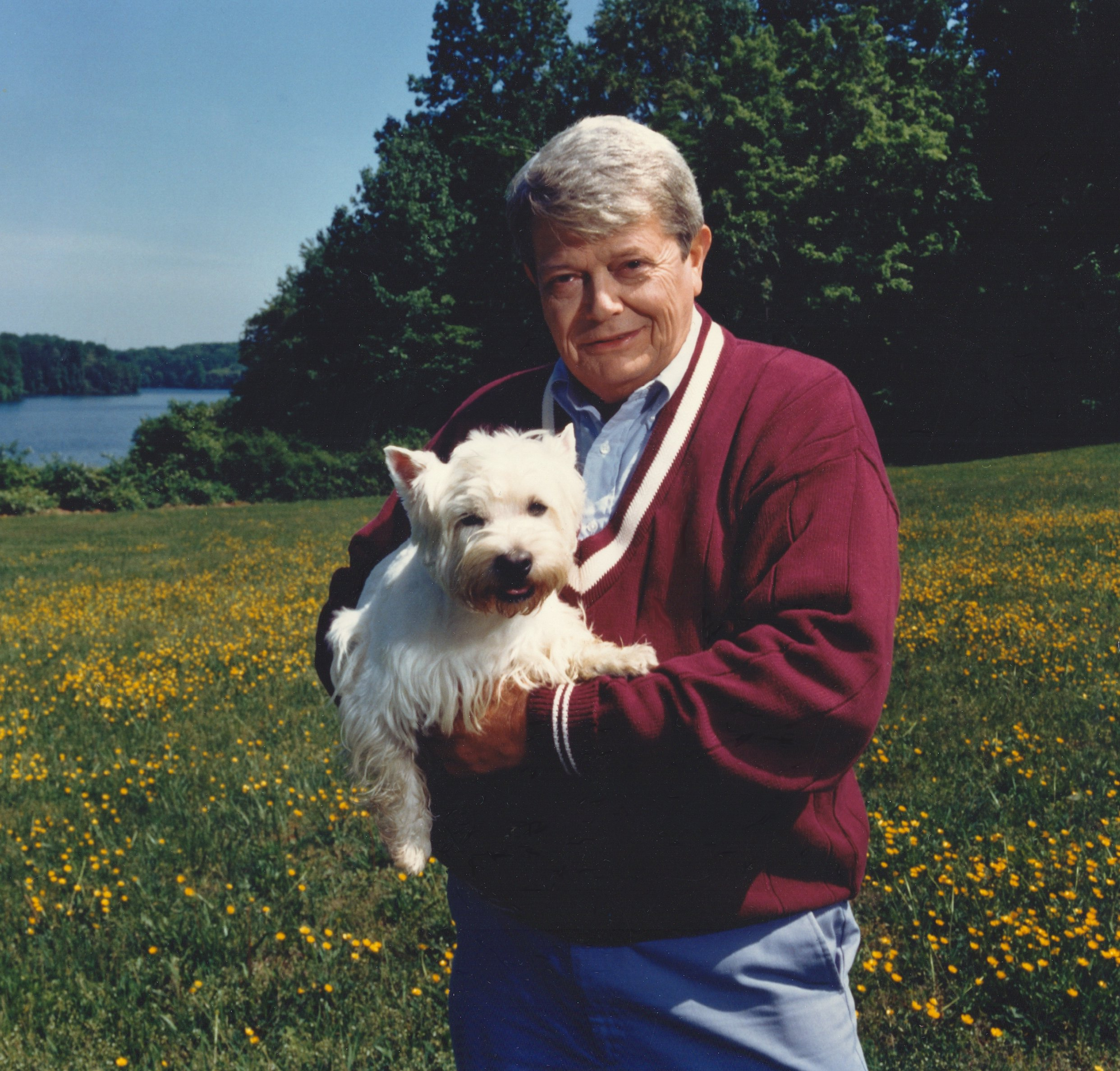
- Simmons, Spring 1993, Wilmington, Delaware
- Born: June 17, 1929; Norfolk, Virginia United States
- Died: April 26, 1997 (aged 67)
- Education: Massachusetts Institute of Technology
- Known for: Simmons–Smith reaction
- Awards: Lavoisier Medal (1994); Priestley Medal (1994); National Medal of Science (1992); Charles Goodyear Medal (1952)
- Scientific career
- Workplaces: DuPont Central Research

Howard Ensign Simmons Jr. (June 17, 1929 – April 26, 1997) was an American chemist, who studied at the Massachusetts Institute of Technology, before starting a long career at DuPont, who with his workmate Ronald D. Smith discovered the Simmons–Smith reaction.

== Biography ==
Simmons was born on June 17, 1929, in Norfolk, Virginia and was an only child. His father was a Sea Captain and his mother was a descendant of Jacob Hübner. Growing up he had a laboratory at home which he began conducting experiments in at the age of 12.

Despite winning a scholarship to attend the University of Virgina, he instead decided to study at MIT and gained a bachelor's degree in chemistry in 1951, where he minored in mathematics and physics, remaining at MIT to complete his post graduate education, and conducting his research under Jack D. Roberts and Arthur C. Cope.

By 1954 he had completed his doctorate and he accepted an offer to join DuPont. Simmons worked in DuPonts Central Research and Development department, beginning research into polyacetylene before moving onto fluoroketone. During his career at DuPont, he and his colleague Ronald D. Smith discovered the Simmons-Smith reaction, and published a journal about it in 1958. By 1959 Simmons had been promoted to be a Supervisor at DuPont.

In 1976, Simmons served as Chair of the organic division of the American Chemical Society. He was a member of the American Academy of Arts and Sciences, the National Academy of Sciences, and the American Philosophical Society.

He retired from DuPont in 1992, after becoming Vice President, and the same year as he was given the National Medal of Science by President Bush, due to his "fundamental contributions to synthesis, molecular structure, and the theory of organic chemistry, and for his productive management of the premier industrial chemical research program in the United States".

The American Chemical Society awarded him the Priestley Medal for his contributions to chemistry, and DuPont awarded him the Lavoisier Medal, in 1994.

He was a heavy smoker for most of his life and developed lung cancer and heart disease. He died on April 26, 1997.
