= Depleted zinc oxide =

Chemical compound

Depleted zinc oxide (DZO) is a zinc oxide depleted in the zinc isotope with the atomic mass 64, and used as a corrosion inhibitor in nuclear pressurized water reactors.

The depletion of ^{64}Zn is necessary, because this isotope is transformed into ^{65}Zn by neutron capture. ^{65}Zn with a half-life of 244.26 days emits gamma radiation with 1.115 MeV. ^{64}Zn has a natural abundance of 48.6%, but in DZO it is reduced below 1%. Adding zinc oxide to the primary water loop of a boiling water reactor or pressurized water nuclear reactor reduces corrosion and therefore minimizes the amount of dissolved materials, especially ^{60}Co.

The isotope separation of zinc is done by gas centrifugation of diethylzinc.
