= Bromofluoromethane =

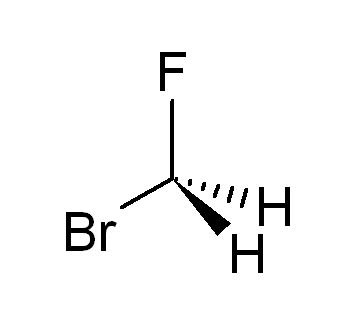

Names
- Preferred IUPAC name Bromo(fluoro)methane
- Other names Bromofluoromethane; Bromofluoromethylene; CFC 31B1; R 31B1

Identifiers
CAS Number	373-52-4
3D model (JSmol)	Interactive image; Interactive image
ChemSpider	55059
ECHA InfoCard	100.117.922
PubChem CID	61108
UNII	22205E7CEM
CompTox Dashboard (EPA)	DTXSID3074319
- InChI: InChI=1S/CH2BrF/c2-1-3/h1H2 Key: LHMHCLYDBQOYTO-UHFFFAOYSA-N; InChI=1/CH2BrF/c2-1-3/h1H2
- SMILES: C(F)Br; BrCF

Properties
Chemical formula	CH_{2}BrF
Molar mass	112.93 g/mol
Appearance	Gas
Boiling point	19 °C (66 °F; 292 K)

Structure
Molecular shape	Tetrahedral
- Except where otherwise noted, data are given for materials in their standard state (at 25 °C [77 °F], 100 kPa). verify (what is ?) Infobox references

Bromofluoromethane is a mixed gaseous halomethane soluble in alcohol and very soluble in chloroform.

Its standard molar entropy, S^{~~o~~}_{gas} is 276.3 J/(mol K) and heat capacity, c_{p} is 49.2 J/(mol K).

== Preparation ==
Up to date, it has been prepared by three prevailingly ineffective methods:

1. From salts of fluoroacetic acid using a Hunsdiecker type of reaction.
2. From dibromofluoromethane by reductive debromination with a Swarts reagent.
3. From a dihalomethane by an halogen exchange reaction or from a halomethane by catalyzed bromination or fluorination.

The method with the highest yield is reductive debromination of dibromofluoromethane using an organotin hydride.

== Uses ==
Bromofluoromethane is an important reagent in the manufacture of intermediates, pharmaceuticals and other chemicals. Usage of bromofluoromethane is regulated due to its ozone depletion potential (0.73). Its isotopomer CH_{2}Br^{18}F contains fluorine-18 (^{18}F) and is used in radiochemistry.

== External sources ==
- Determination of the molecular dipole moment of bromofluoromethane
- http://www.valliscor.com/bromofluoromethane
