= Dibromofluoromethane =

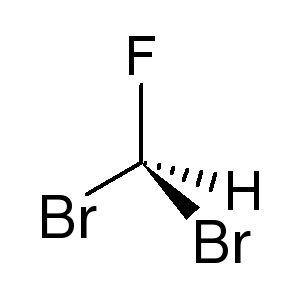

Names
- Preferred IUPAC name Dibromo(fluoro)methane
- Other names Dibromofluoromethane; Fluorodibromomethane; R-12B2

Identifiers
CAS Number	1868-53-7
3D model (JSmol)	Interactive image; Interactive image
ChemSpider	55219
ECHA InfoCard	100.148.872
PubChem CID	61280
UNII	B0517W9BLP
CompTox Dashboard (EPA)	DTXSID2074320
- InChI: InChI=1S/CHBr2F/c2-1(3)4/h1H Key: LTUTVFXOEGMHMP-UHFFFAOYSA-N; InChI=1/CHBr2F/c2-1(3)4/h1H
- SMILES: C(F)(Br)Br; BrC(Br)F

Properties
Chemical formula	CHBr_{2}F
Molar mass	191.83 g/mol
Appearance	Liquid
Density	2.421 g/cm^{3} at 20 °C
Melting point	−78 °C (−108 °F; 195 K)
Boiling point	64.9 °C (148.8 °F; 338.0 K)
Solubility in water	Insoluble

Hazards
- GHS labelling
Pictograms	(GHS02: Flammable) (GHS06: Toxic) (GHS08: Health hazard)

Supplementary data page
- Dibromofluoromethane (data page)
- Except where otherwise noted, data are given for materials in their standard state (at 25 °C [77 °F], 100 kPa). verify (what is ?) Infobox references

Dibromofluoromethane is a mixed halomethane. It is soluble in alcohol, acetone, benzene and chloroform. It is prepared from dibromomethane and antimony(III) fluoride.

== Applications ==
It can be used to prepare bromofluoromethane by reductive debromination with organotin hydride as tributyltin hydride.

== Regulations ==
Its ozone depletion potential (ODP) is 1.0 and it is included in list of Class I Ozone-Depleting Substances.
