= Zinc–copper couple =

Zinc–copper couple is an alloy of zinc and copper that is employed as a reagent in organic synthesis. The “couple” was popularized after the report by Simmons and Smith, published in 1959, on its application as an activated source of zinc required for formation of an organozinc reagent in the Simmons–Smith cyclopropanation of alkenes. The couple has been widely applied as a reagent in other reactions requiring activated zinc metal. Zinc–copper couple does not refer to a rigorously defined chemical structure or alloy composition. The couple may contain varying proportions of copper and zinc; the zinc content is typically greater than 90%, although an alloy containing similar proportions of zinc and copper is used in some cases. The couple is frequently prepared as a darkly-colored powder and is slurried in an ethereal solvent prior to being used in slight excess relative to the substrate. Activation of zinc by copper is essential to the couple's utility, but the origin of this effect is poorly documented. It is speculated that copper enhances reactivity of zinc at the surface of the alloy.

== Synthesis ==
Zinc–copper couple has been prepared by numerous methods, which vary mainly with respect to the source of copper, but also by the ratio of copper to zinc, the physical state of the zinc (e.g. powder or granules), the use of protic acids and other additives, and temperature of the preparation. Most often the couple is generated and isolated prior to use, but routes have been described to storable forms of the alloy. Most methods involve reduction of an oxidized copper species with zinc, which is used in excess.

An early method for the synthesis of zinc–copper couple entailed treatment of a mixture of zinc dust and copper(II) oxide with hydrogen gas at 500 °C. A more convenient and cheaper method proceeds by treatment of zinc powder with hydrochloric acid and copper(II) sulfate. Treatment of zinc powder with copper(II) acetate monohydrate in hot acetic acid is reportedly highly reproducible. The couple may also be generated in situ by reaction of one equivalent of zinc dust with one equivalent of copper(I) chloride (or copper powder) in refluxing ether.

The choice of method is dictated primarily by the application. The development of newer methods was motivated by the need for zinc–copper couple with reproducible behavior.

== Application ==
Zinc–copper couple has found widespread use in organic synthesis, especially in the Simmons–Smith cyclopropanation of alkenes. In this process, the couple (typically a slurry in an ethereal solvent) reacts with methylene iodide to generate iodomethylzinc iodide, which is the intermediate responsible for cyclopropanation.

$$\ce{Zn_\mathit{n}{(Cu)} + CH2I2 -> {IZnCH2I} + Zn_{\mathit{n}-1}(Cu)}$$

The couple has also been employed to generate alkyl zinc reagents for conjugate addition, as a dehalogenating reagent, as a promoter of reductive coupling of carbonyl compounds, and to reduce electron-deficient alkenes and alkynes. Sonication has been employed to enhance the rate of the zinc–copper couple-mediated cycloaddition of α,α’-dibromo ketones to 1,3-dienes.

== See also ==
- Devarda's alloy
- Organozinc compound
