= Diiodomethane =

- Stereo, skeletal formula of diiodomethane with all explicit hydrogens added

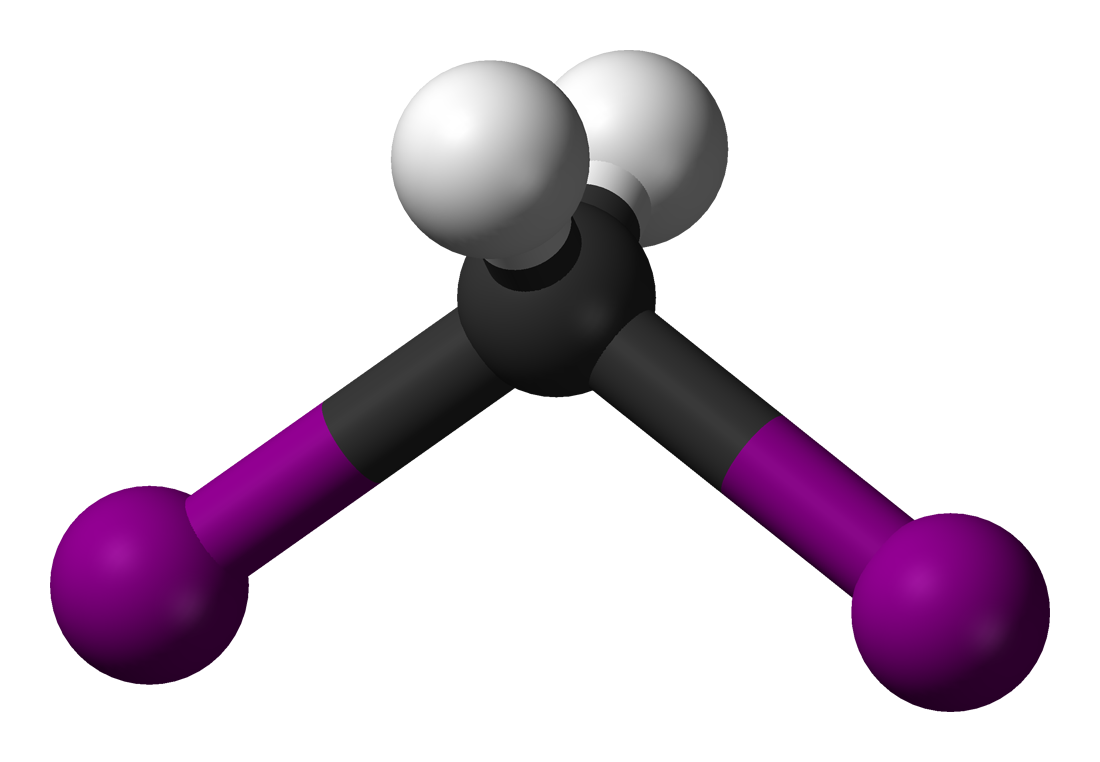
Ball and stick model of diiodomethane
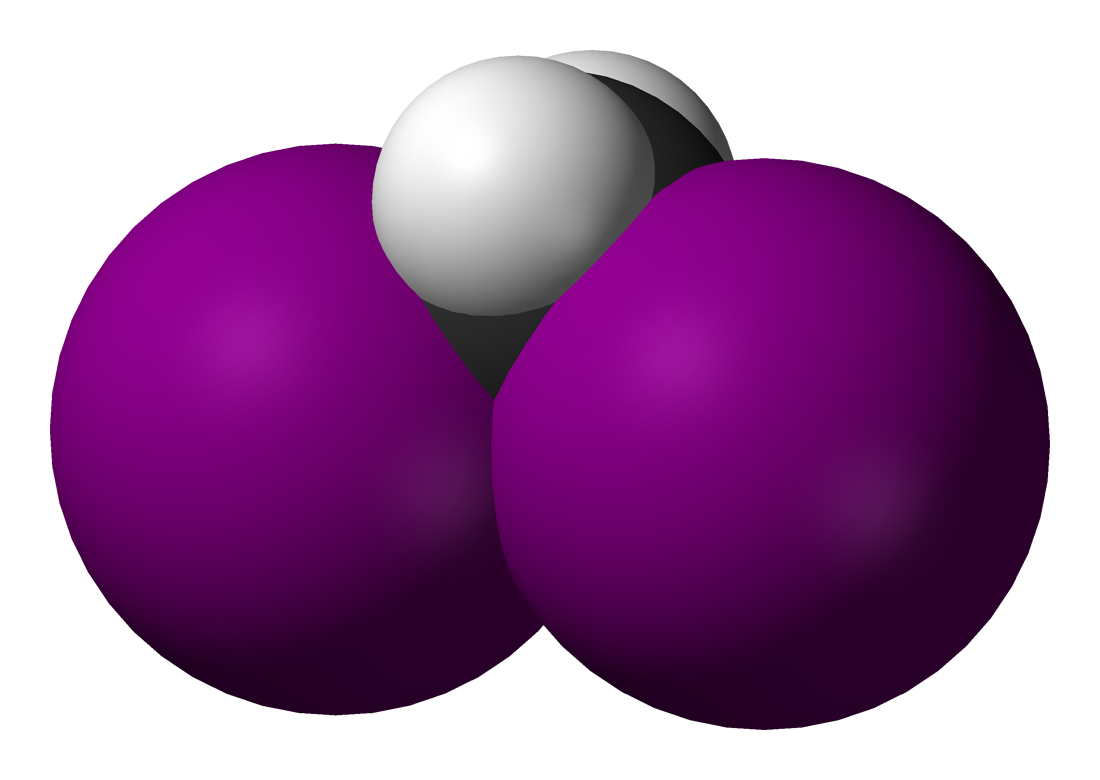
Spacefill model of diiodomethane

Names
- Preferred IUPAC name Diiodomethane

Identifiers
CAS Number	75-11-6
3D model (JSmol)	Interactive image
Beilstein Reference	1696892
ChemSpider	6106
ECHA InfoCard	100.000.765
EC Number	200-841-5
MeSH	methylene+iodide
PubChem CID	6346
RTECS number	PA8575000
UNII	3J731705OX
CompTox Dashboard (EPA)	DTXSID4058784
- InChI: InChI=1S/CH2I2/c2-1-3/h1H2 Key: NZZFYRREKKOMAT-UHFFFAOYSA-N
- SMILES: ICI

Properties
Chemical formula	CH_{2}I_{2}
Molar mass	267.836 g·mol^{−1}
Appearance	Colorless liquid
Density	3.325 g mL^{−1} (3325 kg/m^{3})
Melting point	5.4 to 6.2 °C; 41.6 to 43.1 °F; 278.5 to 279.3 K
Boiling point	182.1 °C; 359.7 °F; 455.2 K
Solubility in water	1.24 g L^{−1} (at 20 °C)
Henry's law constant (k_{H})	23 μmol Pa^{−1} kg^{−1}
Magnetic susceptibility (χ)	−93.10·10^{−6} cm^{3}/mol

Structure
Coordination geometry	Tetragonal
Molecular shape	Tetrahedron

Thermochemistry
Heat capacity (C)	133.81 J K^{−1} mol^{−1}
Std enthalpy of formation (Δ_{f}H^{⦵}_{298})	67.7–69.3 kJ mol^{−1}
Std enthalpy of combustion (Δ_{c}H^{⦵}_{298})	−748.4 to −747.2 kJ mol^{−1}

Hazards
- GHS labelling
Pictograms	(GHS05: Corrosive) (GHS07: Exclamation mark)
Signal word	Danger
Hazard statements	H302, H315, H318, H335
Precautionary statements	P261, P280, P305+P351+P338
NFPA 704 (fire diamond)	3 1 0
Flash point	110 °C (230 °F; 383 K)
Safety data sheet (SDS)	hazard.com

Related compounds
Related alkanes/haloalkanes	Methane; Methyl iodide; Iodoform; Carbon tetraiodide; Difluoromethane; Dichloromethane; Dibromomethane
- Except where otherwise noted, data are given for materials in their standard state (at 25 °C [77 °F], 100 kPa). verify (what is ?) Infobox references

Diiodomethane or methylene iodide, commonly abbreviated "MI", is an organoiodine compound. Diiodomethane is a very dense colorless liquid; however, it decomposes upon exposure to light liberating iodine, which colours samples brownish. It is slightly soluble in water, but soluble in organic solvents. It has a very high refractive index of 1.741, and a surface tension of 0.0508 N·m^{−1}.

== Uses ==
Because of its high density, diiodomethane is used in the determination of the density of mineral and other solid samples. It can also be used as an optical contact liquid, in conjunction with the gemmological refractometer, for determining the refractive index of certain gemstones.

Diiodomethane is a reagent for installing the CH_{2} group. In the Simmons–Smith reaction, it is a source of methylene. In fact the Simmons–Smith reaction does not produce free carbene but proceeds via Zn-CH_{2}I intermediates.

Diiodomethane is also a source of the equivalent of CH^{2+}_{2}. The synthesis of Fe_{2}(CH_{2})(CO)_{8} illustrates this reactivity:

Na_{2}Fe_{2}(CO)_{8} + CH_{2}I_{2} → Fe_{2}(CH_{2})(CO)_{8} + 2 NaI

=== Solvent for NMR spectroscopy ===
Diiodomethane exhibits exceptional solvation properties toward halide-containing organometallic complexes. Examples include cis-[PdCl_{2}(CNCH_{2}Ph)_{2}] (38 mg/mL), trans-[PtI_{2}(NH_{2}iPr)_{2}] (21 mg/mL), [Pd(acac)_{2}] (38 mg/mL), and [CuI_{2}(CNXyl)_{4}] (109 mg/mL). The effect is attributed to strong halogen bonding between the iodine atoms of the solvent and the halide ligands of some of these solutes.

== Preparation ==
Diiodomethane can be prepared from the widely available solvent dichloromethane by the action of sodium iodide in acetone in the Finkelstein reaction:

CH_{2}Cl_{2} + 2 NaI → CH_{2}I_{2} + 2 NaCl

It can also be prepared by reducing iodoform with elemental phosphorus or sodium arsenite:

CHI_{3} + Na_{3}AsO_{3} + NaOH → CH_{2}I_{2} + NaI + Na_{3}AsO_{4}

== Safety ==
Alkyl iodides are alkylating agents, which are potential mutagens.
