= Ralph Landau =

American chemical engineer (1916–2004)

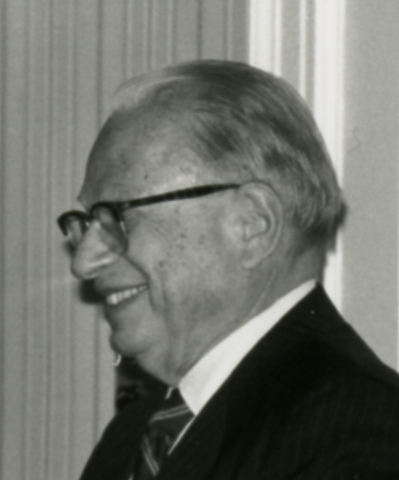
- Ralph Landau, Othmer medal recipient, 1997
- Born: May 19, 1916; Philadelphia, Pennsylvania, U.S.
- Died: April 5, 2004 (aged 87)
- Citizenship: American
- Spouse: Dr. Claire Landau
- Children: Dr. Laurie J. Landeau
- Awards: Othmer Gold Medal, National Medal of Technology, Perkin Medal
- Scientific career
- Fields: Chemistry

Ralph Landau (May 19, 1916 – April 5, 2004) was an American chemical engineer and entrepreneur active in the chemical and petrochemical industries. He is considered one of the top fifty foundational chemical engineers of the first half of the 20th century, and one of the 75 most distinguished contributors to chemical enterprise. He has published extensively on chemical engineering and holds a significant number of patents.

In his 60s, he began a productive second career in economics at Stanford and Harvard Universities, examining economic theory, economic history and the application of technology in the chemical industry. His economic work focuses on understanding the political and economic environment necessary to encourage technological innovation. He published more than 143 papers and nine books.

Ralph Landau won a number of significant awards, including a Lifetime Achievement Award from the Lester Center for Entrepreneurship & Innovation (2003), the first Othmer Gold Medal (1997), the National Medal of Technology from the United States Government, first awarded by President Ronald Reagan in 1985 "for his technical, leadership and entrepreneurial roles in the development of commercially successful petrochemical processes", and the Perkin Medal (1981).

== Early life and education ==
Ralph Landau was born in Philadelphia, Pennsylvania, where he received his primary and secondary education. At age 16, while at Overbrook High School in West Philadelphia, he won a Mayor's Scholarship to attend the University of Pennsylvania. He graduated from the University of Pennsylvania with a bachelor of science degree in chemical engineering in 1937.

He went on to attend the Massachusetts Institute of Technology. He received funding from a national Tau Beta Pi fellowship, applicable at the university of his choice, and further financed his doctoral work by working as a teaching assistant and research assistant. As part of the MIT program Landau participated in the Practice School. His industrial placements included a steel mill in Buffalo, New York, a paper mill in Bangor, Maine, and a chemical plant in Parlin, New Jersey. He also worked in a placement at M. W. Kellogg Company, helping to design petroleum refining plants in the summer of 1939. He received an Sc.D. in chemical engineering from MIT in 1941.

On July 14, 1940, Ralph Landau married Claire Sackler. They have a daughter, Laurie J. Landeau [sic].

== M. W. Kellogg Company ==
From 1941 to 1946, Landau worked as a process development engineer for the New Jersey–based M. W. Kellogg Company, one of the first engineering firms to specialize in design and development for the oil refining and chemical industries. Landau was initially involved in research on catalytic cracking. Kellogg and several other companies wanted to develop techniques for fluid catalytic cracking that would not infringe on Eugene Houdry's patents for fixed-bed cracking.

== Kellex Corporation ==
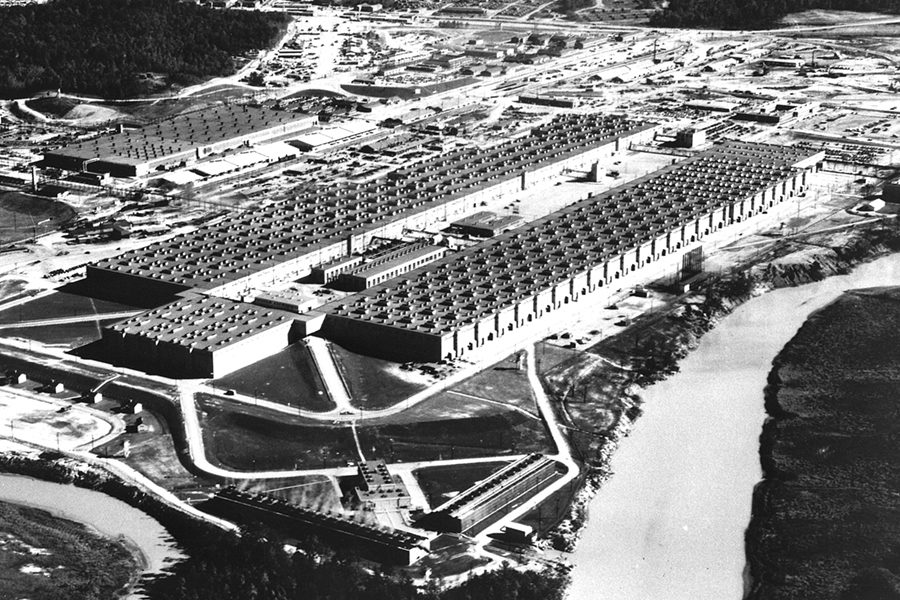
The K-25 building of the Oak Ridge Gaseous Diffusion Plant

During World War II, M. W. Kellogg created a subsidiary company, Kellex Corporation, for work on the Manhattan Project. Scientists at Kellex attempted to design a production-scale facility to produce Uranium-235 for the atomic bomb. Through a process called gaseous diffusion, isotopes of U-235 were separated from the predominant isotope, Uranium-238 by turning uranium metal into uranium hexafluoride gas and straining it through a barrier material.

In 1943 Landau was invited to transfer to Kellogg's subsidiary, Kellex Corporation, to become head of the chemical department at the Manhattan Project's K-25 production plant at Oak Ridge, Tennessee. Landau designed equipment to produce fluorine, a highly reactive substance used to make the uranium hexafluoride for the gaseous diffusion process. He also oversaw the production of the fluorinated compounds used to protect surfaces in contact with uranium hexafluoride, such as the perfluorocarbons perfluoroheptane and perfluoroxylene.

== Scientific Design Co. ==
In 1946, Landau co-founded Scientific Design Co., Inc. with Harry Rehnberg and Robert Egbert. Rehnberg was a construction engineer at Kellex, involved in building the fluorine unit Landau had designed. He became Scientific Design Co.'s first president, and Landau the executive vice president. Scientific Design's intention was to design and create chemical processing technologies for use in the newly developing area of petrochemicals. At the time, most oil companies relied on outside research for process innovation. Scientific Design and other companies worked with clients to develop and pilot new chemical manufacturing processes, then patented and licensed those technologies for wider sales. Such specialized engineering firms accounted for 18% of new developments.

After completing an initial contract with Stauffer Chemical, Scientific Design bought a laboratory near 32nd St and Park Avenue in New York City.

=== Ethylene oxide and ethylene glycol ===
The company's first big success was the development of processes for the direct oxidation of ethylene to ethylene oxide, and transformation of ethylene oxide to ethylene glycol in the early 1950s. Ethylene oxide, a gas, was used for synthesis of ethylene glycol. Ethylene glycol, a liquid, was used to manufacture polyethylene terephthalate resins (PET) for the bottling industry, antifreeze for automobile and airplane engines, and polyester fibers, a material increasingly used the fabric industry.

At the time, oxidation processes tended to use expensive oxidants such as nitric acid, chlorine, and pure oxygen. Landau saw the opportunity to develop a simpler process, using less expensive oxidants, to meet the needs of an expanding market. Scientific Design developed an economically competitive process by using a less expensive oxidant, air, and a more effective catalyst, silver. Landau obtained the first of many patents, "Ethylene Oxide prepared by oxidation of ethylene using a silver catalyst", on November 27, 1956. The improved process was simpler, safer, more efficient, and produced a purer product with fewer by-products than competing chlorohydrin processes. They also developed a novel fixed-bed oxidation process for production of ethylene glycol.

Landau and his colleagues licensed the process first to a British firm, Petrochemicals Ltd., who obtained an exclusive license for the United Kingdom, and built a pilot plant. They also licensed it to the Societe Naphthachimie in Lavera, France, where the first production-scale ethylene oxide and ethylene glycol plant was built. Scientific Design was not the first company to develop direct air oxidation, but they had a major impact through licensing to multiple companies internationally, in Britain, France, the Netherlands, Germany, and the United States. They had licensed the fully developed process over one hundred times by the 1980s. They also marketed proprietary catalysts for the processes they developed.

=== Terephthalic acid ===
In 1955, Scientific Design created another technique, the Mid-Century process of bromine-assisted oxidation of paraxylene to create terephthalic acid. Studying transformations of para-substituted aromatic compounds for use in the Witten Process, Landau's group experimented with a broad range of metal catalysts, solvent media, and oxidation initiators under varying temperatures and pressures. They discovered that a metal catalyst, manganese bromide or cobalt bromide, proved highly effective when used with acetic acid as the solvent medium and oxygen from compressed air as the oxidant. Eventually, experimenters achieved yields of terephthalic acid at 90% of the theoretically possible yield, through a one-pass batch oxidation process. The samples created were of extremely high quality. Again, Landau's team had discovered a unique oxidation catalyst which enabled them to simplify the processes involved, reduce costs, and produce a high-grade yield.

Terephthalic acid was the main raw ingredient in polyester fiber. In 1956, Scientific Design sold worldwide rights to the M-C process to Standard Oil. The first commercial plant was built by their subsidiary, Amoco in Joliet, Illinois. It began production in 1958. Amoco went on to become the world's largest manufacturer of terephthalic acid, and was later acquired by BP.

=== Other processes ===
Under Landau's direction, Scientific Design also developed processes and sold licenses to make maleic anhydride, acetic anhydride, polyisoprene, and chlorinated solvents.

In 1955, Scientific Design licensed an improved catalyst for oxidizing benzene to produce maleic anhydride. Maleic anhydride is used in malathion insecticide. It is a precursor to unsaturated polyester resins, used to make fiberglass composites for boats, cars, wind turbine blades and other products. It is used in the manufacture of copolymers to bind wood fibers into plastic, inhibits corrosion, create protective coatings, and repel water in sunscreens. Later, the company developed a process involving butane rather than benzene. By the 1970s, half of the world's production of maleic anhydride used one of the two processes.

In 1959, Scientific Design announced a boron-mediated process for the oxidation of cyclic aliphatics such as cyclohexane. The oxidation of cyclohexane in the presence of boric acid produced a mixture of cyclohexanol and cyclohexanone, precursors of adipic acid. The process was licensed in the United States by Monsanto and elsewhere by other companies.

Scientific Design found a new method for producing isoprene based on the dimerization of propylene, working with Goodyear Tire and Rubber. They developed processes for the production of acetic anhydride as well. Acetic anhydride is mainly produced by the carbonylation of methyl acetate. Acetic anhydride is used industrially for preparing acetate esters.

== Halcon and Oxirane ==
In 1962 Landau and Rehnberg discovered a novel process - the Halcon process - for converting propylene into propylene oxide. In the new process, hydroperoxides serve as a source of oxygen atoms, which are transferred to the olefin by metal catalysts. Propylene oxide is used in polyurethane foams and in rigid polymers. The side products of the reaction include styrene and tert-Butyl alcohol, which are also useful. The company reorganized in 1963 to form Halcon International, in preparation for expansion. Rehnberg was chairman of the new company, and Landau president. Five subsidiaries were created:

- Halcon Research and Development
- Halcon Scientific Design for design and construction
- Halcon Computer Technologies for computerized engineering services
- Catalyst Development Corp. for manufacture of proprietary catalysts
- Halcon Chemical Company.

By 1965, Landau had publicly announced the company's intention to commercialize its new process.

=== Oxirane ===
In 1967, Halcon partnered with Atlantic Richfield Co. (Arco) to form Oxirane, to produce propylene oxide, styrene, and tert-Butyl alcohol. Both companies were interested in expanding, both companies were researching oxidation, and Arco was aware that Halcon held critical patents in the area. By 1979 the Oxirane Corporation was operating eight plants in locations around the world, with sales exceeding $1 billion a year.

Research into new areas continued at Halcon after the creation of Oxirane. After Harry Rehnberg died in 1975, Landau become chairman and chief executive officer of Halcon. Halcon International, Inc. and the Halcon SD Group designed or constructed more than 300 plants worldwide and signed license agreements with many countries. Halcon Scientific Design's research and development activities produced more than 1400 patents worldwide.

In the late 1970s Halcon and Arco planned to build two new plants at Channelview, Texas, one for propylene oxide processing, and a second for a new process which would produce ethylene glycol directly from ethylene. Unexpected corrosion problems, the energy crisis of the 70's, and high inflation and interest rates led to shut down. In 1980, Landau sold Halcon's 50% share of Oxirane to Arco.

=== Halcon SD Group ===
Halcon, now the Halcon SD Group, refocused on development and licensing of new processes. Technologies were developed for producing acetic anhydride, used in producing rayon and film. The Tennessee Eastman division of Eastman Kodak bought the technology while Halcon SD retained the worldwide licensing rights.

Although the company was technologically strong, the economic climate was not supportive, and Landau sold the company in July 1982, Halcon SD Group to Texas Eastern Corporation. Texas Eastern subsequently sold Halcon SD to Denka (American), which in turn sold it to Bayer (Germany), which sold the R&D section to Linde (Germany).

Landau also held an interest in the Brazilian firm Oxiteno, which he sold in 1985.

== Theories of economics ==
In 1982, Landau entered on a second career as a scholar. His interest in academic economics was spurred by his experiences with Halcon. He wanted to better understand why a technically successful company had been unable to sustain itself. His work focuses on the chemical industry, but applies its lessons to other industries as well. In books such as The Positive Sum Strategy (1986) and Technology and the Wealth of Nations (1992), Landau examined the ways in which countries, government policies and investments, and companies all interact to influence economic growth and technological advancement. He conceptualized technology as capital and examined the economics of innovation and globalization internationally. He saw himself as providing a bridge between academic economists, industrial and business leaders, and scientists and engineers developing new technology.

From 1983 to 2004 Landau served as consulting professor of economics and chemical engineering at Stanford University where he co-directed the Program on Technology and Economic Growth at Stanford's Center for Economic Policy Research.

In 1984 he was appointed a fellow of the faculty at the Harvard University's John F. Kennedy School of Government, where he co-directed the Program on Technology and Economic Policy.

== Philanthropy ==
Ralph Landau has served as a trustee or a member (and chairman) of visiting advisory committees at several universities, including Massachusetts Institute of Technology (MIT), Princeton University, University of Pennsylvania, and California Institute of Technology. He has been a trustee of Cold Spring Harbor Laboratory, a director of Alcoa, and Chairman of the American Section of the Society of Chemical Industry.

=== Massachusetts Institute of Technology ===
Landau has been a long-term supporter of his alma mater, MIT. In particular, he has supported the chemical engineering program and the creation of an endowment for its Practice School, which enables students to gain field experience working in industry. He strongly advocates that students gain managerial and entrepreneurial skills as well as engineering training.

Landau was part of the Visiting Committee to the Department of Chemical Engineering at MIT in 1966. The committee strongly recommended the construction of a new building for the department, and Landau personally funded much of the cost of Building 66, the Landau Chemical Engineering Building. It was designed by I. M. Pei, and completed in 1976.

In 1995, Landau established a new chair at MIT, the Ralph Landau Professor of Chemical Engineering Practice and Director of the Practice School.

=== Stanford University ===
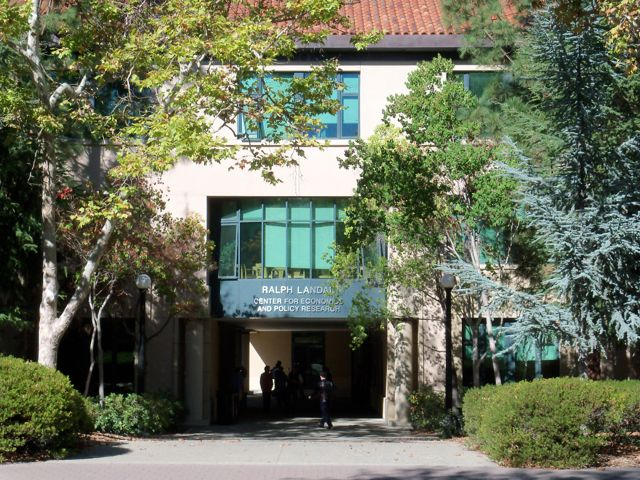
Ralph Landau building at Stanford University, housing the Economics Department.

He has also supported Stanford University. The Landau Building at 579 Serra Mall, designed by Anshen + Allen Architects, was completed in 1994. The building originally housed the Economics department and the Stanford Institute for Economic Policy Research (SIEPR). As of 2010, SIEPR moved next door, and the Stanford Center on Longevity moved into the Landau Building.

=== University of Pennsylvania ===
In 1977, Landau was one of nine trustees and alumni at the University of Pennsylvania who established a challenge fund for a Million Dollar match, to help the annual giving program reach its goal of $4.5 million. Dr. Landau sat on the Board of Overseers for the School of Engineering and Applied Science (SEAS), and served as its chair from 1979–1985.

He established the Ralph Landau Professorship in Management and Technology at the Wharton School of the University of Pennsylvania, as well as Ralph Landau Fellowships. He also established the Robert R. Marshak Term Professorship in Aquatic Medicine at the School of Veterinary Medicine.

== Awards and honors ==
Landau has received more than fifty awards, including several of the highest in his field.

- 2003 Lifetime Achievement Award, Lester Center for Entrepreneurship & Innovation
- 2000 Petrochemical Heritage Award
- 1997 Othmer Gold Medal, Chemical Heritage Foundation
- 1987 John Fritz Medal of the United Engineering Trustees
- 1985 National Medal of Technology, United States Government
- 1982 Founder's Award, American Institute of Chemical Engineers
- 1981 Perkin Medal, Society of Chemical Industry
- 1981 Chemical Pioneer Award, American Institute of Chemists
- 1977 Winthrop-Sears Medal, Chemists' Club
- 1973 Chemical Industry Medal, Society of Chemical Industry

Ralph Landau was elected to the National Academy of Engineering in 1972. He served as a councillor from 1973 to 1979, and as vice president from 1981 to 1990. From 1984 to 1989 he chaired the Academy's 25th Anniversary Fund Drive. He received the NAE Founders Award in 1994.

In 1988 Dr. Landau was elected a foreign member of the Royal Academy of Engineering (United Kingdom). He was also a fellow of the New York Academy of Sciences and the American Academy of Arts and Sciences, and was elected to the American Philosophical Society in 1996.

Landau was awarded honorary degrees by the Polytechnic University of New York, Clarkson College, Ohio State University, and the University of Pennsylvania, where he received an honorary Doctorate of Science for being an "imaginative engineer, self-trained entrepreneur, and hands-on economist."

Ralph Landau died April 5, 2004.
