= C2H6O2 =

The molecular formula C_{2}H_{6}O_{2} (molar mass: 62.07 g/mol, exact mass: 62.03678 u) may refer to:

- Ethylene glycol (ethane-1,2-diol)
- Ethyl hydroperoxide
- Methoxymethanol
- Dimethyl peroxide
