= Harry Rehnberg =

American chemist

- Born: 21 November 1910; Everett, Snohomish County, Washington, USA
- Died: 2 May 1975 (aged 64); Larchmont, Westchester County, New York, USA
- Education: University of Washington
- Scientific career
- Fields: Chemist
- Workplaces: Halcon International

Harry Rehnberg (1910–1975) was an American chemist and businessperson most notable for being the founder of Halcon International and for inventing the revolutionary Halcon process.

== Early life ==
Rehnberg was born in Everett, Washington, November 21, 1910, the son of Swedish immigrants Alex Rehnberg and Helen Rehnberg.

== Education ==
He completed his degree in mechanical engineering at the University of Washington, Seattle.

== Career ==
=== Austin Company ===
His very first job out of college was at the Austin Company, where he assisted in the design and construction of tanks.

=== Manhattan Project ===
It was during World War II that he worked on the development of the atom bomb in the Manhattan Project at Oak Ridge, Tennessee.

It was in the course of his work on the Manhattan Project, that he met Ralph Landau, with whom he would go on to collaborate in many of his future business ventures.

=== Halcon International ===
In 1962 Ralph Landau and Harry Rehnberg discovered a novel process - the Halcon process - for converting propylene intopropylene oxide. In the new process, hydroperoxides serve as a source of oxygen atoms, which are transferred to the olefin by metal catalysts. Propylene oxide is used in polyurethane foams and in rigid polymers. The side products of the reaction include styrene and tert-Butyl alcohol, which are also useful. The company reorganized in 1963 to form Halcon International, in preparation for expansion. Rehnberg was chairman of the new company, and Landau president. Five subsidiaries were created:

- Halcon Research and Development
- Halcon Scientific Design for design and construction
- Halcon Computer Technologies for computerized engineering services
- Catalyst Development Corp. for manufacture of proprietary catalysts
- Halcon Chemical Company.
