= Halohydrin =

Type of functional group in a molecule

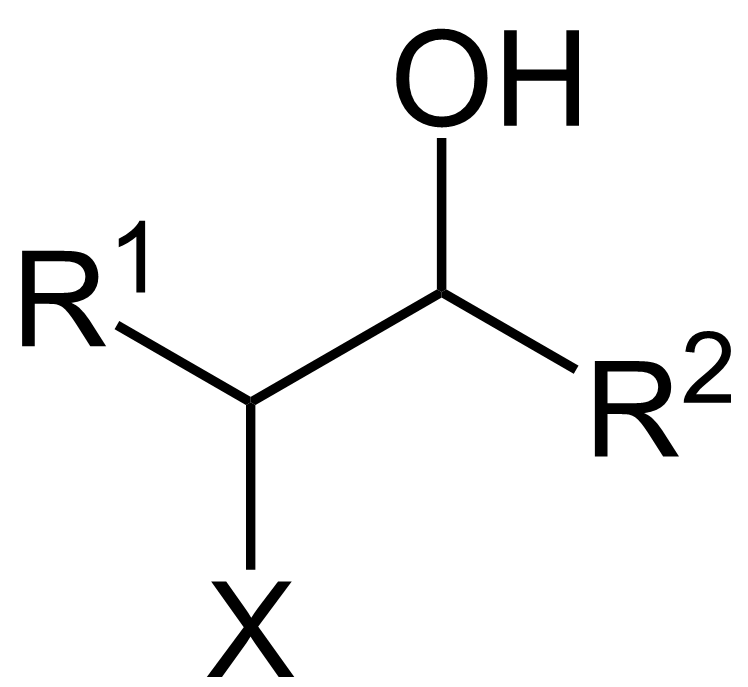
General structure of a halohydrin, where X = I, Br, F, or Cl

Structure of the halohydrin 2-chloroethanol

In organic chemistry a halohydrin (also a haloalcohol or β-halo alcohol) is a functional group in which a halogen and a hydroxyl are bonded to adjacent carbon atoms, which otherwise bear only hydrogen or hydrocarbyl groups (e.g. 2-chloroethanol, 3-chloropropane-1,2-diol). The term only applies to saturated motifs, as such compounds like 2-chlorophenol would not normally be considered halohydrins. Megatons of some chlorohydrins, e.g. propylene chlorohydrin, are produced annually as precursors to polymers.

Halohydrins may be categorized as chlorohydrins, bromohydrins, fluorohydrins or iodohydrins depending on the halogen present.

== Synthesis ==
=== From alkenes ===
Halohydrins are usually prepared by treatment of an alkene with a halogen, in the presence of water. The reaction is a form of electrophilic addition, with the halogen acting as electrophile. In that regard, it resembles the halogen addition reaction and proceeds with anti addition, leaving the newly added X and OH groups in a trans configuration. The chemical equation for the conversion of ethylene to ethylene chlorohydrin is:

H_{2}C=CH_{2} + Cl_{2} + H_{2}O → HO-CH_{2}-CH_{2}-Cl + HCl

When bromination is desired, N-bromosuccinimide (NBS) can be preferable to bromine because fewer side-products are produced.

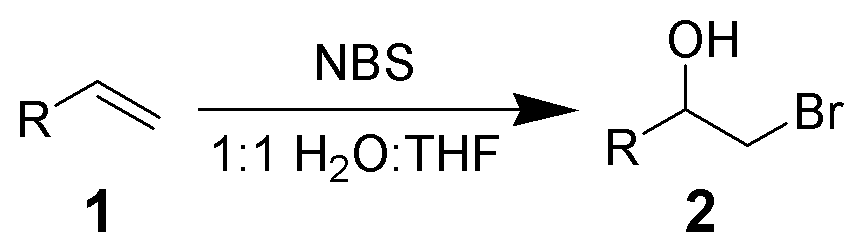
Bromohydrin formation

=== From epoxides ===
Halohydrins may also be prepared from the reaction of an epoxide with a hydrohalic acid, or a metal halide.

This reaction is produced on an industrial scale for the production of chlorohydrin precursors to two important epoxides, epichlorohydrin and propylene oxide. At one time, 2-chloroethanol was produced on a large scale as a precursor to ethylene oxide, but the latter is now prepared by the direct oxidation of ethylene.

=== From 2-chloro acids ===
2-Chlorocarboxylic acids can be reduced with lithium aluminium hydride to the 2-chloroalcohols. The required 2-chlorocarboxylic acids are obtained in a variety of ways, including the Hell–Volhard–Zelinsky halogenation. 2-Chloropropionic acid is produced by chlorination of propionyl chloride followed by hydrolysis of the 2-chloropropionyl chloride. Enantiomerically pure (S)-2-chloropropionic acid and several related compounds can be prepared from amino acids via diazotization.

== Reactions ==
In presence of a base halohydrins undergo internal S_{N}2 reaction to form epoxides. Industrially, the base is calcium hydroxide, whereas in the laboratory, potassium hydroxide is often used.

This reaction is the reverse of the formation reaction from an epoxide and can be considered a variant of the Williamson ether synthesis. Most of the world's supply of propylene oxide arises via this route.

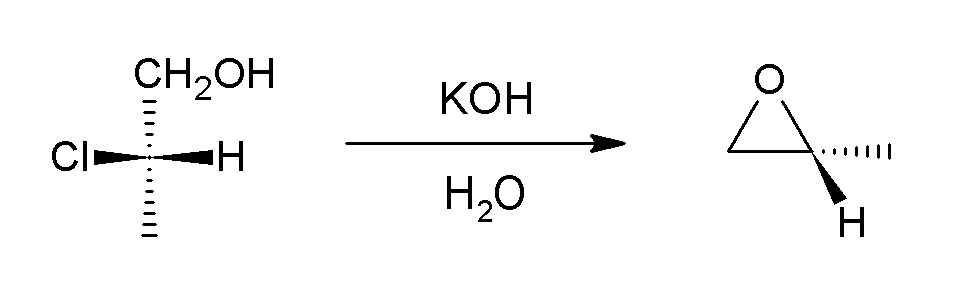

Such reactions can form the basis of more complicated processes, for example epoxide formation is one of the key steps in the Darzens reaction.

== Halogenated halohydrin ==
2,2,2-trichloroethanol

Compounds such as 2,2,2-trichloroethanol, which contain multiple geminal halogens adjacent to a hydroxyl group may be considered halohydrins (although, strictly speaking, they fail the IUPAC definition) as they possess similar chemistry. In particular they also undergo intramolecular cyclisation to form dihaloepoxy groups. These species are both highly reactive and synthetically useful, forming the basis of the Jocic–Reeve reaction, Bargellini reaction and Corey–Link reaction.

== Safety ==
As with any functional group, the hazards of halohydrins are difficult to generalize as they may form part of an almost limitless series of compounds, with each structure having different pharmacology. In general, simpler low molecular weight compounds are often toxic and carcinogenic (e.g. 2-chloroethanol, 3-MCPD) by virtue of being alkylating agents. This reactivity can be put to good use, for instance in the anti-cancer drug mitobronitol. A number of synthetic corticosteroids exist bearing a fluorohydrin motif (triamcinolone, dexamethasone).

== Misnomers ==
Despite their rather suggestive names epichlorohydrin and sulfuric chlorohydrin are not halohydrins, although the former is most commonly produced using a chlorohydrin intermediate.

== See also ==
- Cyanohydrin
