= Dimethyl peroxide =

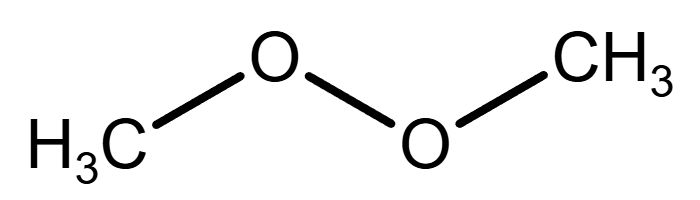

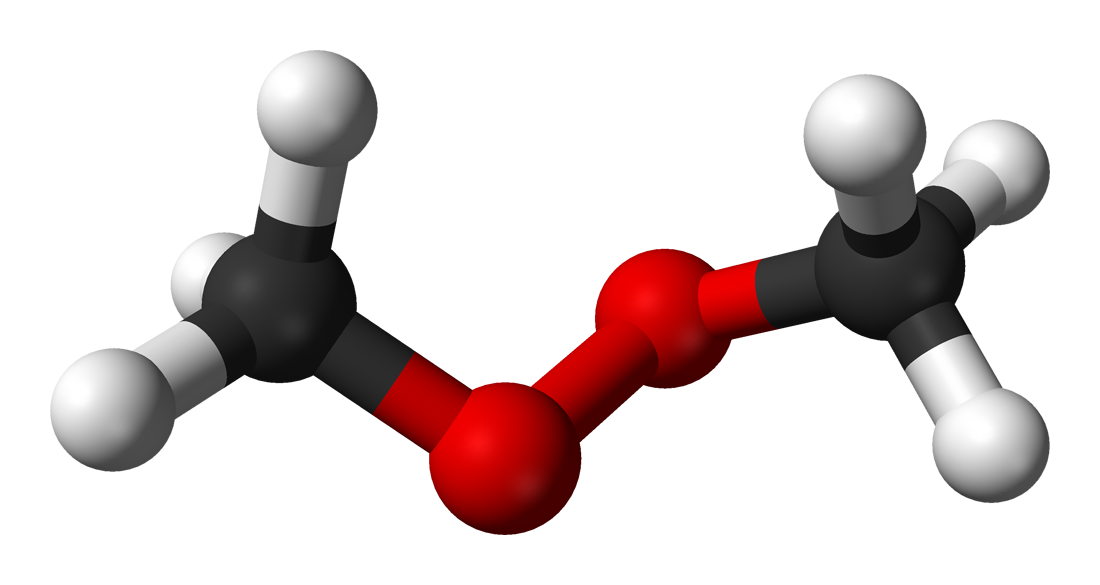

Names
- IUPAC name Methylperoxymethane
- Other names: Dimethyl peroxide; Dimethyldioxidane

Identifiers
CAS Number	690-02-8
3D model (JSmol)	Interactive image
Beilstein Reference	1730817
ChEBI	CHEBI:35928
ChemSpider	120261
Gmelin Reference	305275
PubChem CID	136492
CompTox Dashboard (EPA)	DTXSID40219038
- InChI: InChI=1S/C2H6O2/c1-3-4-2/h1-2H3 Key: SRXOCFMDUSFFAK-UHFFFAOYSA-N
- SMILES: COOC

Properties
Chemical formula	CH_{3}OOCH_{3}
Molar mass	62.068 g·mol^{−1}
Appearance	Colorless volatile liquid
Odor	Sharp
Density	About 0.85 g/cm^{3}
Boiling point	About 35 °C
Solubility in water	Soluble
Solubility	Soluble in organic solvents but less so in water.

Hazards
- Occupational safety and health (OHS/OSH)
Main hazards	Explosive

Related compounds
Related compounds	Di-tert-butyl peroxide; Dimethyldioxirane; Hydrogen peroxide; Methyl hydroperoxide; Dimethyl ether; Dimethyl disulfide; 1,2-Dimethylhydrazine; Bis(trifluoromethyl)peroxide
- Except where otherwise noted, data are given for materials in their standard state (at 25 °C [77 °F], 100 kPa). Infobox references

Dimethyl peroxide is an organic compound with the formula CH_{3}OOCH_{3}. It is a colorless volatile liquid.

== Preparation ==
Dimethyl peroxide can be synthesized through several methods, primarily by the reaction of hydrogen peroxide with dimethyl ether or other methyl-containing compounds, in the presence of an acid as a catalyst. This method requires careful low temperature control to prevent decomposition or even explosion.

It is also prepared by the reaction of dimethyl sulfate with hydrogen peroxide in an alkaline solution, followed by distillation. The chemical equation for the main reaction is:

(CH_{3})_{2}SO_{4} + H_{2}O_{2} + 2 NaOH → CH_{3}OOCH_{3} + Na_{2}SO_{4} + 2 H_{2}O

Another approach includes treating hydroperoxides with alkylating agents, which can produce dimethyl peroxide among other products.

Its production is conducted in controlled laboratory conditions on low temperature due to the compound's instability and potential hazards associated with organic peroxides.

== Structure ==
The structure of molecule of dimethyl peroxide is H_{3}C−O−O−CH_{3}. It contains a peroxide linkage −O−O−. The O-O bond length is about 145 pm. The shape of dimethyl peroxide's molecule is similar to hydrogen peroxide, where both of its hydrogens are replaced by methyl groups. It is classified as a dialkyl peroxide. It is one of the simplest organic peroxides.

== Characteristics ==
Dimethyl peroxide is highly reactive due to the fact it has a weak O-O bond that is prone to cleavage, leading to formation of radicals. It is an extremely weak basic (practically neutral) compound (based on its pK_{a}).

== Reactions ==
Dimethyl peroxide is involved in various chemical reactions, mainly as a radical initiator or oxidizing agent. Under thermal or photolytic conditions, dimethyl peroxide decomposes to generate free radicals, which can initiate polymerization reaction or other radical-based reactions.

== Uses ==
Dimethyl peroxide is used for a number of purposes, like:

- Radical initiator in polymer chemistry. It is used to initiate polymerization reactions for producing plastics and resins.
- It acts as an oxidizing agent in organic synthesis, causing the conversion of alcohols to aldehydes or ketones.
- It is used in epoxidation reactions where it reacts with alkenes to form epoxides, which are valuable intermediates in organic synthesis.
- It is used in environmental chemistry. It is investigated for potential applications in wastewater treatment because of its oxidative properties.

== Occurrence ==
Within the human and mammalian cell, dimethyl peroxide is mostly located in the cytoplasm and in the extracellular fluid. Dimethyl peroxide can be found in green vegetables as well. This makes dimethyl peroxide a potential biomarker. Dimethyl peroxide is found in Basella alba (Ceylon spinach), an edible plant.

== Safety ==
Dimethyl peroxide is sensitive to heat and light. It should be stored under cool and dark conditions. It readily decomposes into radicals, making it very reactive with many organic compounds. This compound should be handled with care because of its explosive nature when concentrated or improperly stored. Generally, dilute solutions of organic peroxides (<70%) are safe, but the presence of a catalyst as an impurity (often a transition metal such as iron, nickel, cobalt, manganese, or vanadium) may cause rapid decomposition, a buildup of heat, and even an explosion. Solutions of peroxides often become explosive when evaporated to near-dryness or dryness. Dry organic peroxides may explode. May also explode upon contact with heat, with shock, friction or contamination. May ignite combustible materials (clothing, oil, wood, paper, etcetera...). May be ignited by sparks, heat or flames.

== See also ==
- Organic peroxides
