= Titanosilicate =

Synthetic mineral family used as heterogeneous catalysts

A titanosilicate, also called titanium silicate or silicotitanate, is a silicate mineral where some portion of the silicon atoms have been replaced by titanium(IV) atoms. The term most commonly refers to the zeolitic polymorph, also called titanium silicalite, which is a heterogeneous catalyst in industrial chemistry.

== Applications ==
Titanosilicate catalysts are commonly used in oxidation reactions that employ hydrogen peroxide as an oxidant. The production of propylene oxide by epoxidation of propylene is a major industrial application. Epoxidation by H_{2}O_{2} is considered a greener alternative to epoxidation via propylene chlorohydrin, but this reaction of H_{2}O_{2} and propylene competes with many side reactions. The formation of titanium coordination complexes in the zeolite structure improves selectivity for the epoxide.

== Synthesis ==
Titanosilicates can be prepared via crystallisation of silica and titanium dioxide with quaternary ammonium cations as a structure-directing agent. The silica and titanium dioxide are provided by hydrolysis of tetraethyl orthosilicate and tetrabutyl orthotitanate.

== Structure ==
TS-1, the major industrial titanosilicate, has the MFI crystal structure seen in ZSM-5, another significant synthetic zeolite. The titanium atoms are tetrahedrally coordinated, unlike the octahedral coordination found in the main polymorphs of titanium(IV) oxide. Because of the relatively small amount of titanium in the relatively large structure, it is difficult to determine the exact locations of active sites; this is a major obstacle in understanding the reaction mechanism of titanosilicate catalysis.

Other titanosilicates have been produced in other zeolite structures, as well as related mesoporous materials such as Ti-MCM-41.

== History ==
The first synthetic titanosilicate zeolite, TS-1, was patented by Taramasso et al. in 1983. TS-1 was first used industrially by EniChem in 1986, for the hydroxylation of phenol. They would later expand its usage into the production of cyclohexanone oxime. TS-1 as a catalyst for epoxidation of propylene was first deployed at industrial scale by Dow Chemical and BASF in 2008.
