= TS1 =

TS1 or TS-1 may refer to:

- Taylor Swift (album), the 2006 debut album by Taylor Swift
- The Sims (video game), a 2000 strategic life-simulation video game
- Toy Story, a 1995 American animated family film
- Zenvo TS1 GT, a Danish supercar
- Jet_fuel#TS-1, Russian jet fuel
- Tegafur, cancer drug also known as TS-1
- Titanosilicate TS-1, zeolite catalyst
