= C4H10 =

The molecular formula C_{4}H_{10} (molar mass: 58.12 g/mol, exact mass: 58.0783 u) may refer to:

- Butane, or n-butane
- Isobutane, also known as methylpropane or 2-methylpropane
