= Guido Bargellini =

Italian chemist (1879–1963)

Guido Bargellini (1879–1963) was an Italian organic chemist. He specialized in natural product chemistry, in particular, flavonoid dyes and coumarins, and the compound santonin. He was admitted to the Accademia dei Lincei in 1946. The Bargellini reaction is named for him.

== Bibliography ==
- Eintrag bei treccani.it (in Italian)
