= Methyl hydroperoxide =

Names
- IUPAC name Methaneperoxol
- Other names: Methane hydroperoxide; Methyl hydrogen peroxide; Hydroperoxymethane

Identifiers
CAS Number	3031-73-0
3D model (JSmol)	Interactive image
ChemSpider	17190
PubChem CID	18199
CompTox Dashboard (EPA)	DTXSID10184401
- InChI: InChI=1S/CH4O2/c1-3-2/h2H,1H3 Key: MEUKEBNAABNAEX-UHFFFAOYSA-N
- SMILES: COO

Properties
Chemical formula	CH_{4}O_{2}
Molar mass	48.041 g·mol^{−1}
Appearance	colorless liquid
Density	0.9967 g/cm^{3} at 15 °C
Melting point	<25 °C
Boiling point	46 °C (115 °F; 319 K)
Solubility in water	Miscible in water and diethyl ether

Hazards
- Occupational safety and health (OHS/OSH)
Main hazards	explosive
- Except where otherwise noted, data are given for materials in their standard state (at 25 °C [77 °F], 100 kPa). Infobox references

Methyl hydroperoxide is the organic compound with the formula CH_{3}OOH. It is a volaltile colorless liquid. In addition to being of theoretical interest as the simplest organic hydroperoxide, methyl hydroperoxide is an intermediate in the oxidation of methane. When condensed or in concentrated form methyl hydroperoxide is rather explosive, unlike tertiary hydroperoxides such as tert-butyl hydroperoxide. Its laboratory preparation was first reported in 1929.
