= Ethylbenzene hydroperoxide =

Names
- IUPAC name 1-hydroperoxyethylbenzene
- Other names α-methylbenzyl hydroperoxide, 1-phenylethyl hydroperoxide

Identifiers
CAS Number	3071-32-7
3D model (JSmol)	Interactive image
ChemSpider	83231
ECHA InfoCard	100.019.402
EC Number	221-341-3
PubChem CID	92189
UNII	76D16BZV57
CompTox Dashboard (EPA)	DTXSID00883734
- InChI: InChI=1S/C8H10O2/c1-7(10-9)8-5-3-2-4-6-8/h2-7,9H,1H3 Key: GQNOPVSQPBUJKQ-UHFFFAOYSA-N
- SMILES: CC(C1=CC=CC=C1)OO

Properties
Appearance	colorless liquid
Density	1.07500 g/cm^{3}
Boiling point	45 °C (113 °F; 318 K) 0.05 torr
- Except where otherwise noted, data are given for materials in their standard state (at 25 °C [77 °F], 100 kPa). Infobox references

Ethylbenzene hydroperoxide is the organic compound with the formula C_{6}H_{5}CH(O_{2}H)CH_{3}. A colorless liquid, EBHP is a common hydroperoxide. It has been used as an O-atom donor in organic synthesis. It is chiral. Together with tert-butyl hydroperoxide and cumene hydroperoxide, ethylbenzene hydroperoxide is important commercially.

The compound is produced by direct reaction of ethylbenzene with oxygen, an autoxidation.
