= Isobutane (data page) =

Chemical data page

This page provides supplementary chemical data on isobutane.

== Material Safety Data Sheet ==
The handling of this chemical may incur notable safety precautions. It is highly recommend that you seek the Material Safety Datasheet (MSDS) for this chemical from a reliable source such as SIRI, and follow its directions.

== Structure and properties ==
Structure and properties
Index of refraction, n_{D}	?
Abbe number	?
Dielectric constant, ε_{r}	? ε_{0} at ? °C
Bond strength	?
Bond length	?
Bond angle	?
Magnetic susceptibility	?
Surface tension	10.3 dyn/cm at 20°C; P 300 kPa

== Thermodynamic properties ==
Phase behavior
Triple point	113.55K (–159.8 °C), 0.019483 Pa
Critical point	408.7 K (134.4 °C), 3655 kPa
Std enthalpy change of fusion, Δ_{fus}H^{~~o~~}	4.59 kJ/mol
Std entropy change of fusion, Δ_{fus}S^{~~o~~}	39.92 J/(mol·K)
Std enthalpy change of vaporization, Δ_{vap}H^{~~o~~}	21.3 kJ/mol
Std entropy change of vaporization, Δ_{vap}S^{~~o~~}	81.46 J/(mol·K)
Solid properties
Std enthalpy change of formation, Δ_{f}H^{~~o~~}_{solid}	? kJ/mol
Standard molar entropy, S^{~~o~~}_{solid}	? J/(mol K)
Heat capacity, c_{p}	? J/(mol K)
Liquid properties
Std enthalpy change of formation, Δ_{f}H^{~~o~~}_{liquid}	? kJ/mol
Standard molar entropy, S^{~~o~~}_{liquid}	200.79 J/(mol K)
Heat capacity, c_{p}	129.70 J/(mol K) –253°C to –13°C
Gas properties
Std enthalpy change of formation, Δ_{f}H^{~~o~~}_{gas}	–134.2 kJ/mol
Standard molar entropy, S^{~~o~~}_{gas}	249.7 J/(mol K)
Enthalpy of combustion, Δ_{c}H^{~~o~~}	–2869 kJ/mol
Heat capacity, c_{p}	95.21 J/(mol K) at 20°C
van der Waals' constants	a = 1304.1 L^{2} kPa/mol^{2} b = 0.1142 liter per mole

== Vapor pressure of liquid ==
P in mm Hg	1	10	40	100	400	760	1520	3800	7600	15200	30400	45600
T in °C	–109.2	–86.4	–68.4	–54.1	–27.1	–11.7	7.5	39.0	68.8	99.5	—	—

Table data obtained from CRC Handbook of Chemistry and Physics 44th ed.

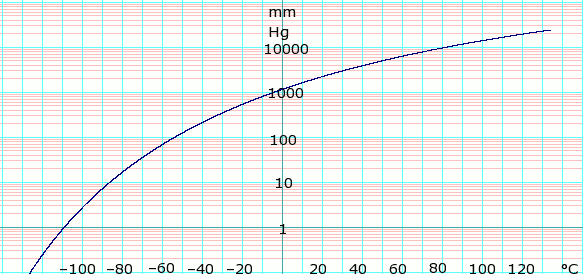
Vapor pressure of iso-butane. From formula: $\scriptstyle \log_{10} P_{mmHg} = 6.74808 - \frac {882.80} {240.0+T}$ obtained from Lange's Handbook of Chemistry, 10th ed.

== Spectral data ==
UV-Vis
λ_{max}	? nm
Extinction coefficient, ε	?
IR
Major absorption bands	? cm^{−1}
NMR
Proton NMR
Carbon-13 NMR
Other NMR data
MS
Masses of main fragments

This box:
- Except where noted otherwise, data relate to Standard temperature and pressure.
- Reliability of data general note.
