= Di-tert-butyl peroxide =

Moderately stable organic peroxide

- Chemical structure of di-tert-butyl peroxide

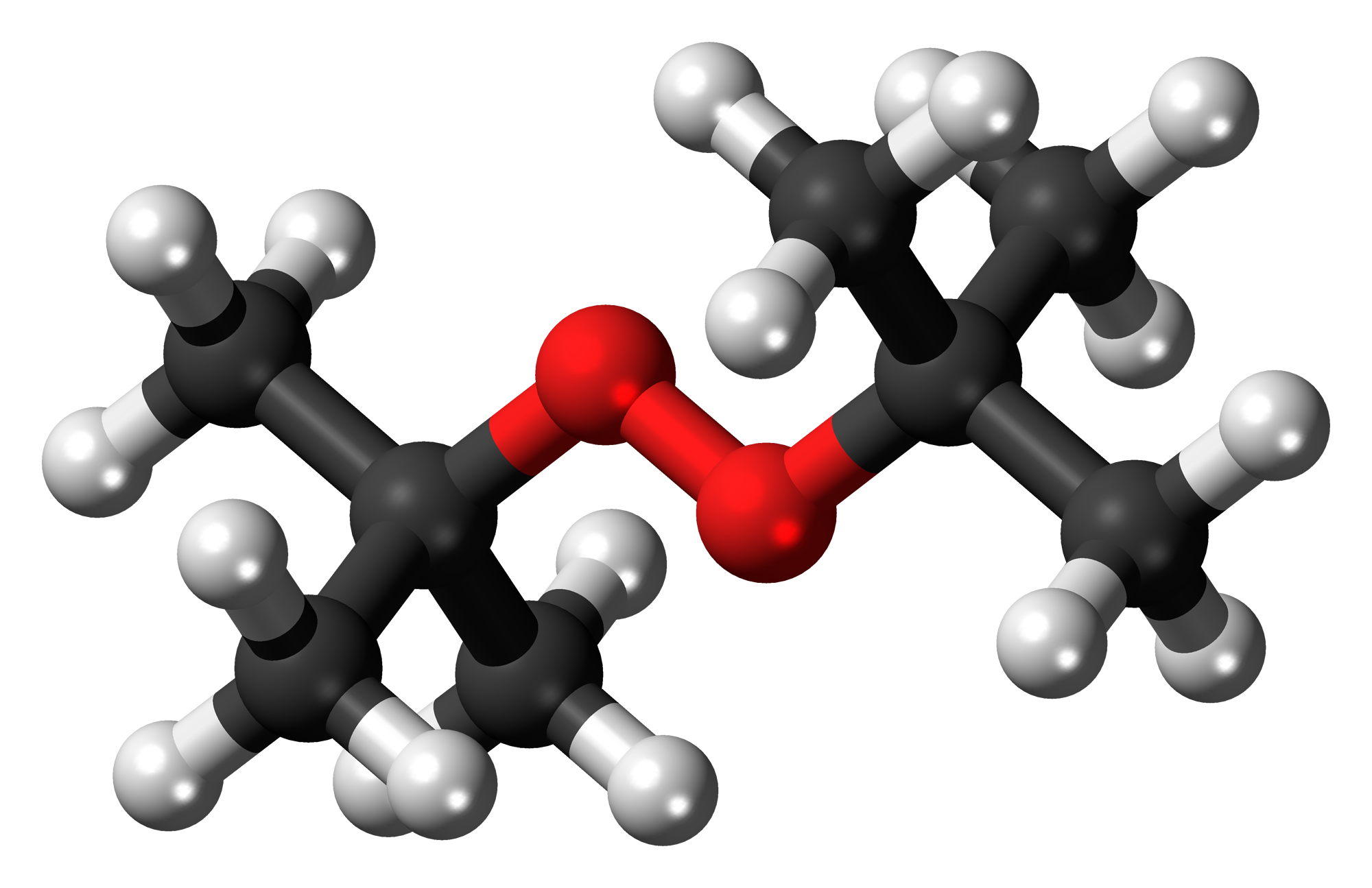

Names
- Preferred IUPAC name 2-(tert-Butylperoxy)-2-methylpropane

Identifiers
CAS Number	110-05-4
3D model (JSmol)	Interactive image
ChemSpider	7742
ECHA InfoCard	100.003.395
PubChem CID	8033
UNII	M7ZJ88F4R1
CompTox Dashboard (EPA)	DTXSID2024955
- InChI: InChI=1S/C8H18O2/c1-7(2,3)9-10-8(4,5)6/h1-6H3 Key: LSXWFXONGKSEMY-UHFFFAOYSA-N; InChI=1/C8H18O2/c1-7(2,3)9-10-8(4,5)6/h1-6H3 Key: LSXWFXONGKSEMY-UHFFFAOYAY
- SMILES: O(OC(C)(C)C)C(C)(C)C

Properties
Chemical formula	C_{8}H_{18}O_{2}
Molar mass	146.230 g·mol^{−1}
Density	0.796 g/cm^{3}
Melting point	−40 °C (−40 °F; 233 K)
Boiling point	109 to 111 °C (228 to 232 °F; 382 to 384 K)
- Except where otherwise noted, data are given for materials in their standard state (at 25 °C [77 °F], 100 kPa). verify (what is ?) Infobox references

Di-tert-butyl peroxide or DTBP is an organic compound consisting of a peroxide group bonded to two tert-butyl groups. It is one of the most stable organic peroxides, due to the tert-butyl groups being bulky. It is a colorless liquid.

== Reactions ==
The peroxide bond undergoes homolysis at temperatures above 100 °C. For this reason di-tert-butyl peroxide is commonly used as a radical initiator in organic synthesis and polymer chemistry. The decomposition reaction proceeds via the generation of methyl radicals.

(CH_{3})_{3}COOC(CH_{3})_{3} → 2 (CH_{3})_{3}CO^{•}
(CH_{3})_{3}CO^{•} → (CH_{3})_{2}CO + CH^{•}_{3}
2 CH^{•}_{3} → C_{2}H_{6}

DTBP can in principle be used in engines where oxygen is limited, since the molecule supplies both the oxidizer and the fuel.

== Safety ==
DTBP is an irritant to the nose, eyes, and skin. It is also flammable, and can explode unpredictably at high (≈150 °C) temperatures.

== See also ==
- tert-Butyl hydroperoxide
- Bis(trimethylsilyl) peroxide
