= Silicalite =

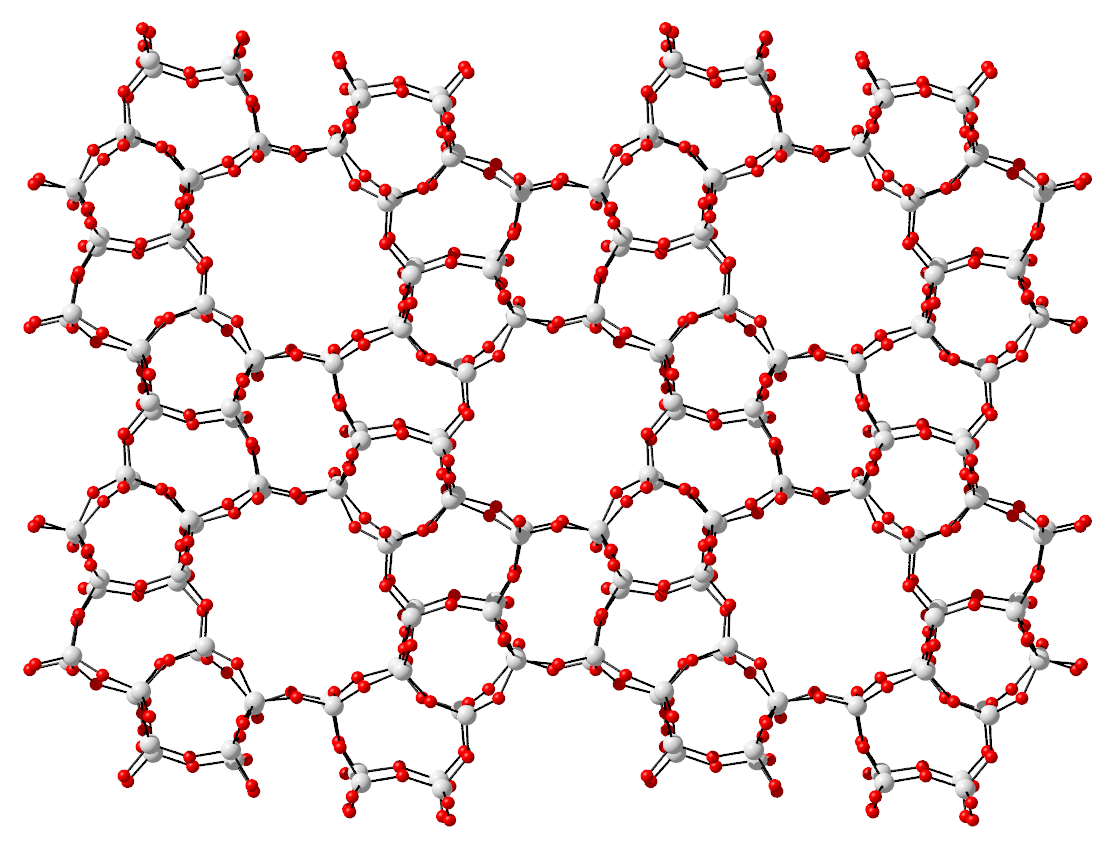

Identifiers
3D model (JSmol)	Interactive image
- SMILES: [Si].[O].[O]

Properties
Chemical formula	O_{2}Si
Molar mass	60.083 g·mol^{−1}
Appearance	white solid
Density	1.76 g/cm^{3}
Melting point	1,300 °C (2,370 °F; 1,570 K) decomposition
- Except where otherwise noted, data are given for materials in their standard state (at 25 °C [77 °F], 100 kPa). Infobox references

Silicalite is an inorganic compound with the formula SiO_{2}. It is one of several forms (polymorphs) of silicon dioxide. It is a white solid. It consists of tetrahedral silicon centers and two-coordinate oxides. It is prepared by hydrothermal reaction using tetrapropylammonium hydroxide followed by calcining to remove residual ammonium salts. The compound is notable in being ca. 33% porous. It is useful because the material contains (SiO)_{10} rings that allow sorption of hydrophobic molecules of diameter 0.6 nm.

A commercially important modification of silicalite is titanium silicalite. With the formula Si_{1−x}Ti_{x}O_{2}, it consists of silicalite with Ti doped into some Si sites. Unlike conventional polymorphs of titanium dioxide, the Ti centers in titanium silicalite have tetrahedral coordination geometry. The material is a useful catalyst for the reaction of hydrogen peroxide with propylene to give propylene oxide.
