= Isobutane =

Isomer/derivative of butane

Chemical structure of isobutane with all atoms explicitly shown
Skeletal formula of isobutane
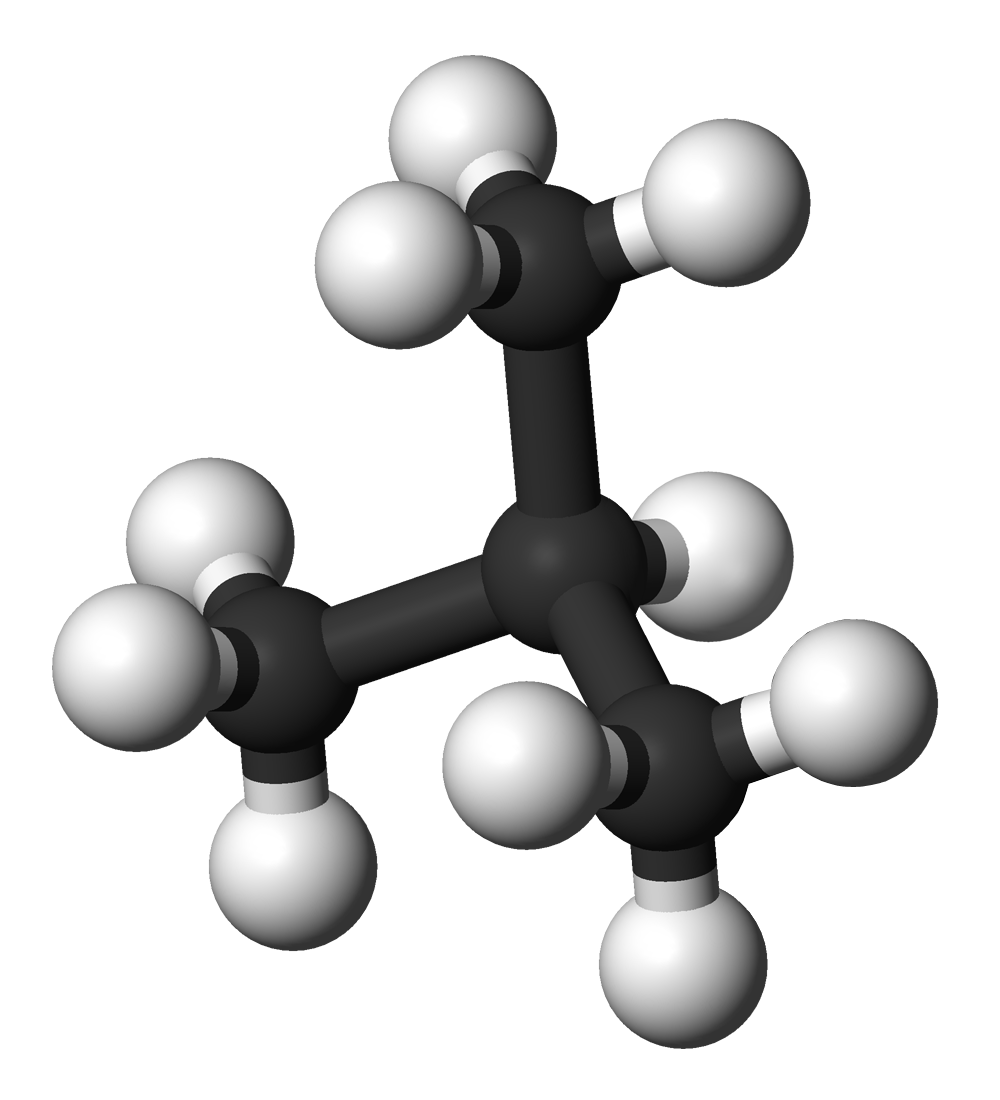
Ball and stick model of isobutane
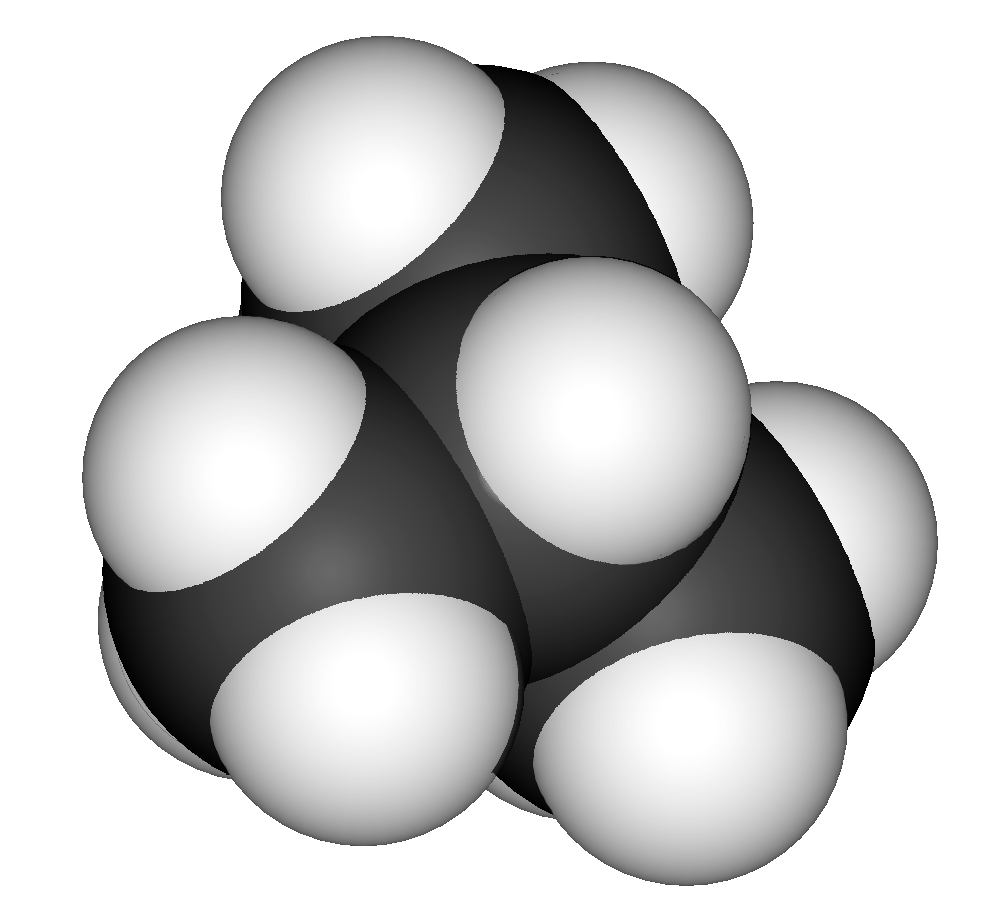
Spacefill model of isobutane

Names
- Preferred IUPAC name 2-Methylpropane
- Other names: Isobutane; R600a

Identifiers
CAS Number	75-28-5
3D model (JSmol)	Interactive image
Abbreviations	Me_{3}CH
Beilstein Reference	1730720
ChEBI	CHEBI:30363
ChemSpider	6120
ECHA InfoCard	100.000.780
EC Number	200-857-2
E number	E943b (glazing agents, ...)
Gmelin Reference	1301
KEGG	D04623
PubChem CID	6360
RTECS number	TZ4300000
UNII	BXR49TP611
UN number	1969
CompTox Dashboard (EPA)	DTXSID1026401
- InChI: InChI=1S/C4H10/c1-4(2)3/h4H,1-3H3 Key: NNPPMTNAJDCUHE-UHFFFAOYSA-N
- SMILES: CC(C)C

Properties
Chemical formula	C_{4}H_{10}
Molar mass	58.124 g·mol^{−1}
Appearance	Colorless gas
Odor	Odorless
Density	2.51 kg/m^{3} (at 15 °C, 100 kPa); 563 kg/m^{3} (at 15 °C, boiling liquid)
Melting point	−159.42 °C (−254.96 °F; 113.73 K)
Boiling point	−11.78 °C (10.80 °F; 261.37 K)
Solubility in water	48.9 mg⋅L^{−1} (at 25 °C (77 °F))
Vapor pressure	3.1 atm (310 kPa) (at 21 °C (294 K; 70 °F))
Henry's law constant (k_{H})	8.6 nmol⋅Pa^{−1}⋅kg^{−1}
Conjugate acid	Isobutanium
Magnetic susceptibility (χ)	−51.7·10^{−6} cm^{3}/mol

Thermochemistry
Heat capacity (C)	96.65 J⋅K^{−1}⋅mol^{−1}
Std enthalpy of formation (Δ_{f}H^{⦵}_{298})	−134.8 – −133.6 kJ⋅mol^{−1}
Std enthalpy of combustion (Δ_{c}H^{⦵}_{298})	−2.86959 – −2.86841 MJ⋅mol^{−1}

Hazards
- GHS labelling
Pictograms	(GHS02: Flammable)
Signal word	Danger
Hazard statements	H220
Precautionary statements	P210
NFPA 704 (fire diamond)	1 4 0
Flash point	−83 °C (−117 °F; 190 K)
Autoignition temperature	460 °C (860 °F; 733 K)
Explosive limits	1.4–8.3%
- NIOSH (US health exposure limits)
PEL (Permissible)	None
REL (Recommended)	TWA 800 ppm (1900 mg/m^{3})
IDLH (Immediate danger)	N.D.
Safety data sheet (SDS)	lindeus.com

Related compounds
Related alkane	Isopentane

Supplementary data page
- Isobutane (data page)
- Except where otherwise noted, data are given for materials in their standard state (at 25 °C [77 °F], 100 kPa). verify (what is ?) Infobox references

Isobutane, also known as i-butane, 2-methylpropane or methylpropane, is a chemical compound with molecular formula HC(CH_{3})_{3}. An isomer of butane, it is a colorless, odorless gas. Isobutane is the simplest alkane with a tertiary carbon atom, and is used as a precursor molecule in the petrochemical industry, such as in the synthesis of isooctane.

== Nomenclature ==
The traditional name isobutane was still retained in the 1993 IUPAC recommendations, but is no longer recommended according to the 2013 recommendations. Since the longest continuous chain in isobutane contains only three carbon atoms, the preferred IUPAC name is 2-methylpropane but the locant (2-) is typically omitted in general nomenclature as redundant; C2 is the only position on a propane chain where a methyl substituent can be located without altering the main chain and forming the constitutional isomer n-butane.

== Production ==
Isobutane is obtained by isomerization of butane.

Isomerization of butane

== Uses ==
Isobutane is the principal feedstock in alkylation units of refineries. Using isobutane, gasoline-grade "blendstocks" are generated with high branching for good combustion characteristics. Typical products created with isobutane are 2,4-dimethylpentane and especially 2,2,4-trimethylpentane.

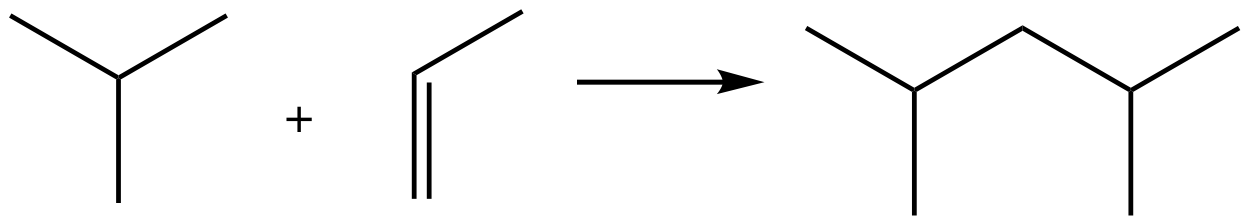
Typical acid-catalyzed route to 2,4-dimethylpentane.

=== Solvent ===
In the Chevron Phillips slurry process for making high-density polyethylene, isobutane is used as a diluent. As the slurried polyethylene is removed, isobutane is "flashed" off, and condensed, and recycled back into the loop reactor for this purpose.

=== Precursor to tert-butyl hydroperoxide ===
Isobutane is oxidized to tert-butyl hydroperoxide, which is subsequently reacted with propylene to yield propylene oxide. The tert-butanol that results as a by-product is typically used to make gasoline additives such as methyl tert-butyl ether (MTBE).

=== Miscellaneous uses ===
Isobutane is also used as a propellant for aerosol spray cans.

Isobutane is used as part of blended fuels, with propane and butane, especially common in fuel canisters used for camping, see Campingaz.

== Refrigerant ==
Isobutane is used as a refrigerant. Use in refrigerators started in 1993 when Greenpeace presented the Greenfreeze project with the former East German company Foron. In this regard, blends of pure, dry "isobutane" (R-600a) (that is, isobutane mixtures) have negligible ozone depletion potential and very low global warming potential (having a value of 3.3 times the GWP of carbon dioxide) and can serve as a functional replacement for R-12, R-22 (both of these being commonly known by the trademark Freon), R-134a, and other chlorofluorocarbon (CFC) or hydrofluorocarbon refrigerants in conventional stationary refrigeration and air conditioning systems.

As a refrigerant, isobutane poses a fire and explosion risk in addition to the hazards associated with non-flammable CFC refrigerants. Substitution of this refrigerant for motor vehicle air conditioning systems not originally designed for isobutane is widely prohibited or discouraged.

Vendors and advocates of hydrocarbon refrigerants argue against such bans on the grounds that there have been very few such incidents relative to the number of vehicle air conditioning systems filled with hydrocarbons.

A leak of isobutane in the refrigerant system of a fridge initiated the 2024 Valencia residential complex fire in Spain, which killed 10 and injured 15 people.
