= Bargellini reaction =

Chemical reaction

Named after	Guido Bargellini
Reaction type	Coupling reaction

The Bargellini reaction is a chemical reaction discovered in 1906 by Italian chemist Guido Bargellini. The original reaction was a mixture of the reagents phenol, chloroform, and acetone in the presence of a sodium hydroxide solution. Prior to Bargellini's research, the product attributed to this multi-component reaction (MCR) had been described as a phenol derivative in chemistry texts at the time. However, Bargellini demonstrated that a carboxylic acid derivative was actually the correct structure.

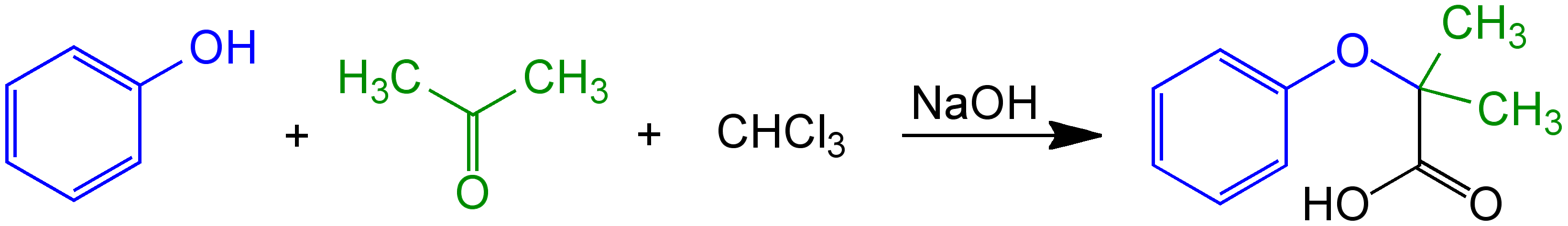

Later, organic chemists have used the reaction as a general method of organic synthesis for highly hindered or bulky morpholinones or piperazinones from ketones (particularly acetone) and either β-amino alcohols or diamines.

== History ==
Guido Bargellini was a disciple of Hermann Emil Louis Fischer, the German chemist and Nobel laureate famous for the eponymous Fischer esterification reaction. Bargellini did his post-doctoral lab research in Fischer's laboratory. He spent most of his career as a chemist at the University of Rome.

His interest in coumarins, a recently isolated compound at the time, led Bargellini to experiment with multi-component reactions (MCRs) between phenols, chloroform, and acetone in a solution of a sodium hydroxide. He discovered the structure given to the compound produced a carboxylic acid instead of a phenol as previously thought. In 1894, Link, a German chemist, had published the reaction in Chemisches Zentralblatt and patented it. However, he wrote the product was either a ketone or a phenol, specifically he claimed it was a "hydroxyphenyl hydroxyisopropyl keton" or "hydroxyisobutyrylphenol." When Bargellini conducted the same experiment and began testing the product, the chemical properties could not be from a ketone or a phenol. Instead, he was certain it was a carboxylic acid, specifically an "α-phenoxyisobutyric acid." Link himself experimented with reactions in 1900 that proved his original claim was erroneous, yet it was never changed. Since Bargellini correctly identified the product, its structure and properties, then published his results in the Gazzetta Chimica Italiana, the reaction was named after him.

However, the importance of the reaction in organic synthesis and later the pharmaceutical industry has made it important historically. Since the reaction is relatively easy to perform—the reagents being readily available—many other almost identical reactions were named in the decades after. This discovery led the way for new transformation reaction, the presently-established Bargellini-type reactions, that has been of great importance, specifically in the pharmaceutical industry. It also paved the way for later name reactions, like the Jocic–Reeve reaction and the Corey–Link reaction. The Jocic–Reeve and Corey–Link reactions are almost always featured together with the Bargellini reaction in a MCR. The reaction itself has been modified several times to increase efficiency or produce a modified product.

The adaptability of the reaction is one of its greatest aspects. No decade has gone by without an important addition or twist of the reaction taking place. In the author's own words, "The first phase in the reaction is probably the formation of acetonechloroform--(which may, indeed, be used in place of the chloroform), this being then acted on by sodium hydroxide in presence of acetone, yielding α-hydroxyisobutyric acid, which, with the phenol, gives α-phenoxyisobutyric acid. The chloroform may also be replaced by bromoform, bromal, chloral, or carbon tetrachloride or tetrabromide." Most textbooks describe the reaction as a way to make morpholinones or piperazinones, but it use extend much farther than that.

One hundred years later, the Bargellini reaction itself was used for the condensation of coumarins, an ironic twist to the history of the reaction since this was Bargellini's primary compound of interest and his own named reaction produced it.

== Reactions and reaction mechanisms ==
The original Bargellini reaction (1906):

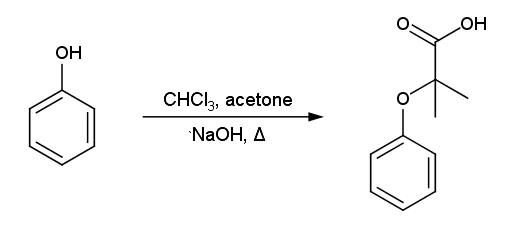

Reaction mechanism for original Bargellini reaction (1906):

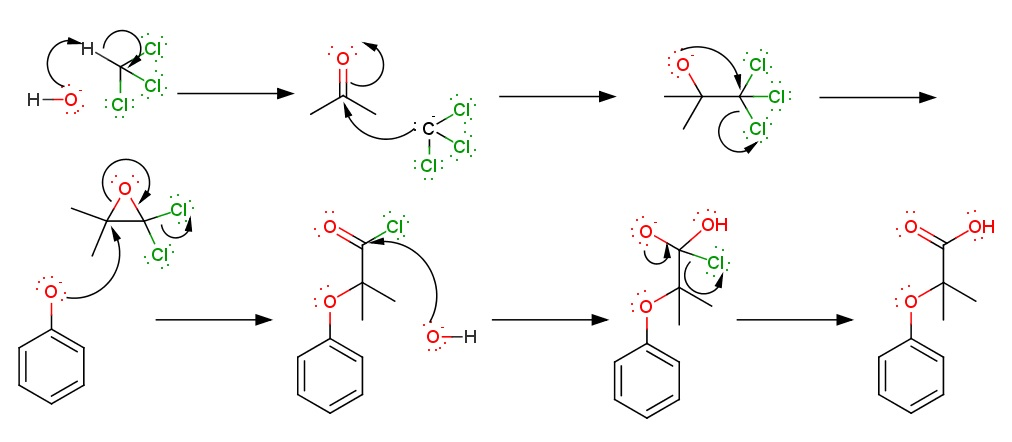

Present-day Bargellini reaction used for synthesis of hindered morpholinones or piperazinones from ketones (primarily acetone) and 2-amino-2-methylpropan-1-ol (β-amino alcohols) OR 1,2-diaminopropanes (diamines). The solvent used is dichloromethane (DCM), also known as methylene chloride with a benzyltriethylammonium chloride catalyst. The solvent and catalyst are frequently changed when using different reagents. Diamines tend to give higher product yields than β-amino alcohols, as shown in the two possible scenarios below:

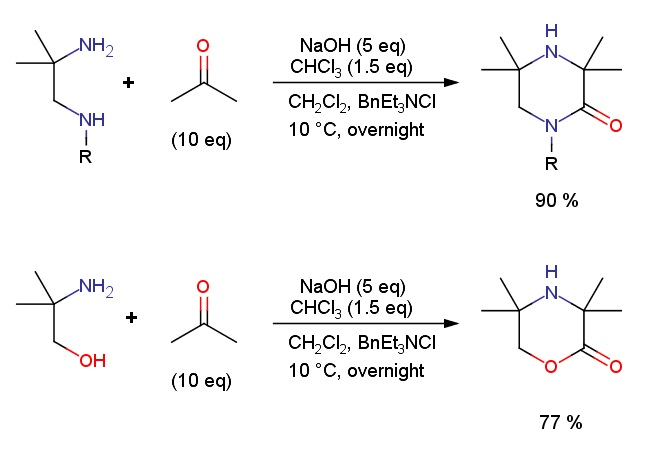

Reaction mechanism for Bargellini reaction:

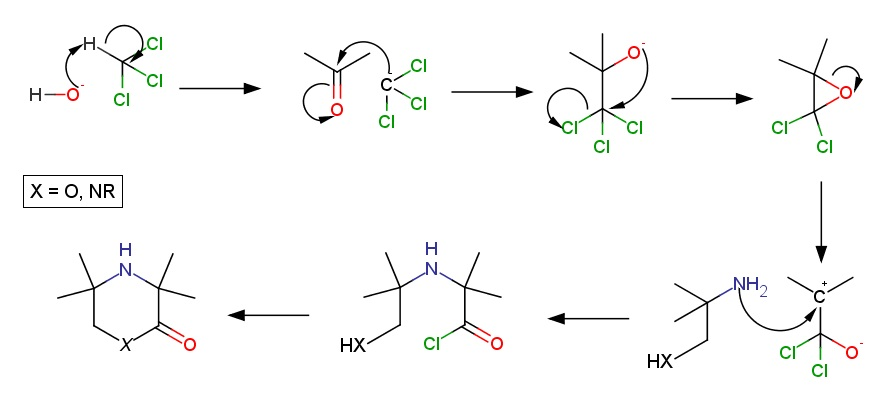

The reaction mechanism proceeds when a sterically accessible ketone, usually acetone, is added to a solution of chloroform (trichloromethane) under strong basic conditions, creating a trichloromethide anion by deprotonation. This forms the corresponding trichloromethyl carbinol or -alkoxide, in a similar way to the Grignard reaction.

This trihalogenated product is subject to addition via a base-induced intramolecular etherification gem-dichloro epoxy. The amine can attack the oxirane due to formation of tertiary carbocation in a nucleophilic substitution SN1 concerted elimination of one atom of chlorine. The nucleophilic intermediate is highly reactive and regioselective at the α-carbon, resulting in the formation of a α-substituted carboxylic acid chloride.

The final step occurs by nucleophilic acyl substitution and solvolysis, where the amino or hydroxyl group attacks the acid chloride forming the corresponding heterocycle. The end product is a carboxylic acid derivative (primarily lactones and amides).
