= Methoxymethanol =

Names
- Preferred IUPAC name Methoxymethanol
- Other names Formaldehyde methyl hemiacetal

Identifiers
CAS Number	4461-52-3
3D model (JSmol)	Interactive image
Beilstein Reference	1900186
ChEBI	CHEBI:46791
ChemSpider	56311
ECHA InfoCard	100.022.476
EC Number	224-722-2
PubChem CID	62540
UNII	9T7K15960E
CompTox Dashboard (EPA)	DTXSID4027571
- InChI: InChI=1S/C2H6O2/c1-4-2-3/h3H,2H2,1H3 Key: VHWYCFISAQVCCP-UHFFFAOYSA-N
- SMILES: COCO

Properties
Chemical formula	C_{2}H_{6}O_{2}
Molar mass	62.068 g·mol^{−1}
Density	0.948

Hazards
- GHS labelling
Pictograms	(GHS02: Flammable) (GHS07: Exclamation mark) (GHS08: Health hazard)
Signal word	Warning
Hazard statements	H226, H302, H371
Precautionary statements	P210, P233, P240, P241, P242, P243, P260, P264, P270, P280, P301+P312, P303+P361+P353, P309+P311, P330, P370+P378, P403+P235, P405, P501
Flash point	39.9 °C (103.8 °F; 313.0 K)
- Except where otherwise noted, data are given for materials in their standard state (at 25 °C [77 °F], 100 kPa). Infobox references

Methoxymethanol is a chemical compound which is both an ether and an alcohol, a hemiformal. The structural formula can be written as CH_{3}OCH_{2}OH. It has been discovered in space.

== Formation ==
Methoxymethanol forms spontaneously when a water solution of formaldehyde and methanol are mixed. or when formaldehyde is bubbled through methanol.

In space methoxymethanol can form when methanol radicals (CH_{2}OH or CH_{3}O) react. These are radiolysis products derived when ultraviolet light or cosmic rays hit frozen methanol.

Methanol can react with carbon dioxide and hydrogen at 80°C and some pressure with a ruthenium or cobalt catalyst, to yield some methoxymethanol.

== Properties ==
Different conformations of the molecule are Gauche-gauche (Gg), Gauche-gauche' (Gg'), and Trans-gauche (Tg).
