= Bis(trimethylsilyl)peroxide =

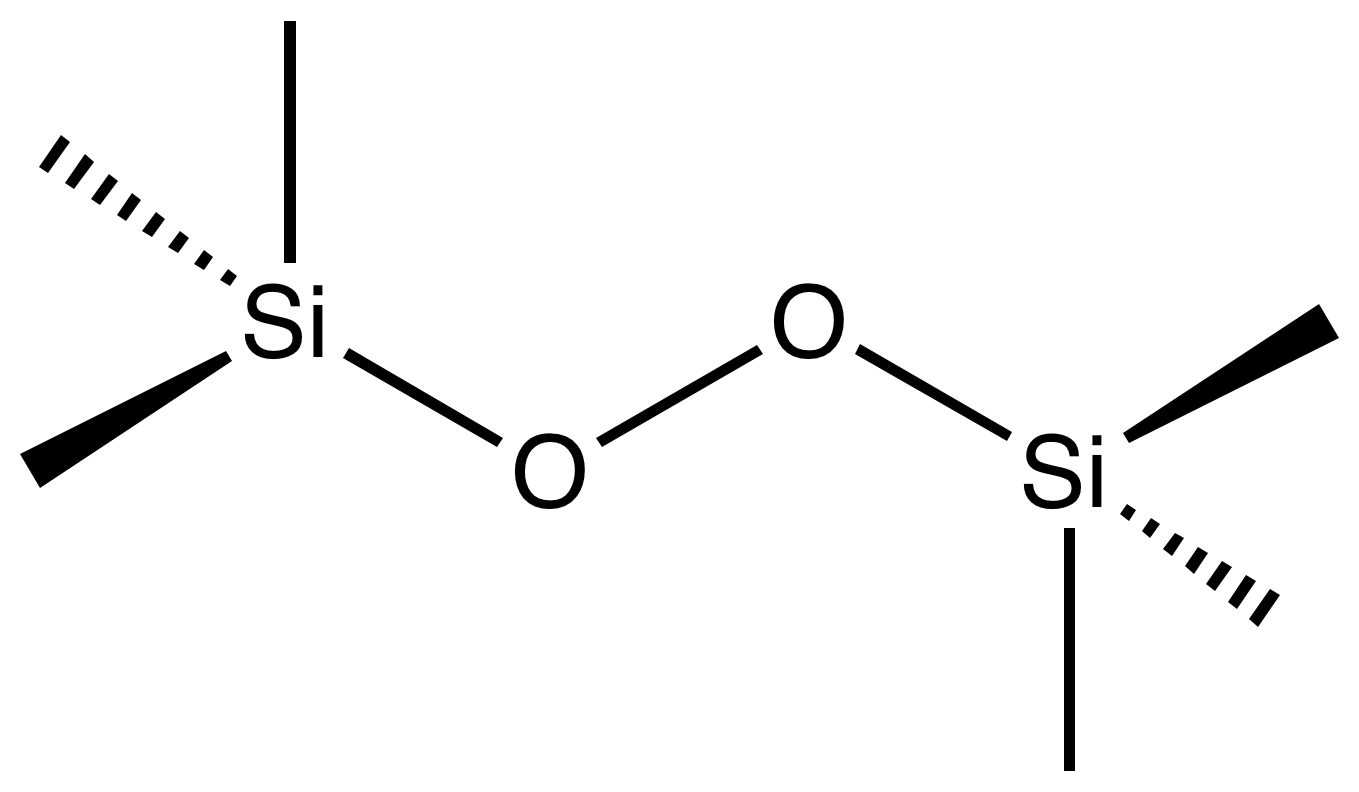

Names
- Preferred IUPAC name Peroxybis(trimethylsilane)

Identifiers
CAS Number	5796-98-5
3D model (JSmol)	Interactive image
ChemSpider	8233642
PubChem CID	10058088
CompTox Dashboard (EPA)	DTXSID60434842
- InChI: InChI=1S/C6H18O2Si2/c1-9(2,3)7-8-10(4,5)6/h1-6H3 Key: XPEMYYBBHOILIJ-UHFFFAOYSA-N
- SMILES: C[Si](C)(C)OO[Si](C)(C)C

Properties
Chemical formula	C_{6}H_{18}O_{2}Si_{2}
Molar mass	178.378 g·mol^{−1}
Appearance	colorless oil
Density	0.829 g/cm^{3}
Boiling point	35 °C (95 °F; 308 K) 35 torr
- Except where otherwise noted, data are given for materials in their standard state (at 25 °C [77 °F], 100 kPa). Infobox references

Bis(trimethylsilyl)peroxide (sometimes abbreviated as BTSP) is an organosilicon compound with the formula ((CH_{3})_{3}SiO)_{2}. It is a colorless liquid that is soluble in organic solvents so long as they lack acidic groups. The compound represents an aprotic analogue of hydrogen peroxide and as such it is used for certain sensitive organic oxidations. Upon treatment with organolithium compounds, it affords the silyl ether.

== Preparation ==
It is prepared by treating trimethylsilyl chloride with the hydrogen peroxide–urea complex.
