= Propylene oxide =

- Structural formula

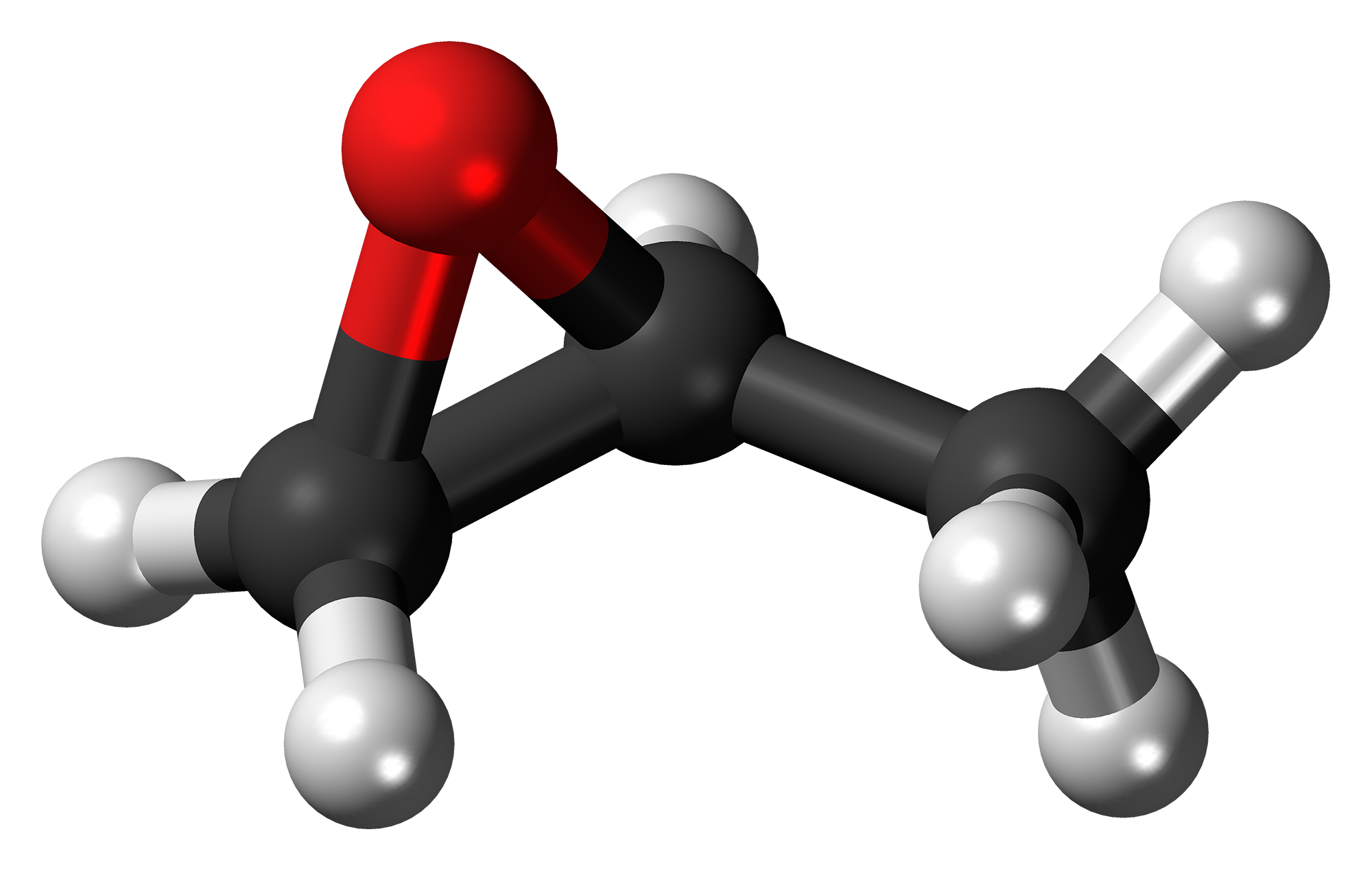
- Ball-and-stick model of the propylene oxide molecule

Names
- Preferred IUPAC name (2R)-2-Methyloxirane (2S)-2-Methyloxirane
- Other names Propylene oxide Epoxypropane; Propylene epoxide 1,2-Propylene oxide Methyl oxirane 1,2-Epoxypropane; Propene oxide Methyl ethylene oxide Methylethylene oxide

Identifiers
CAS Number	75-56-9
3D model (JSmol)	Interactive image
ChEBI	CHEBI:38685
ChemSpider	6138
ECHA InfoCard	100.000.800
EC Number	200-879-2
KEGG	C15508
PubChem CID	6378
UNII	Y4Y7NYD4BK
CompTox Dashboard (EPA)	DTXSID5021207
- InChI: InChI=1S/C3H6O/c1-3-2-4-3/h3H,2H2,1H3 Key: GOOHAUXETOMSMM-UHFFFAOYSA-N
- SMILES: CC1CO1

Properties
Chemical formula	C_{3}H_{6}O
Molar mass	58.080 g·mol^{−1}
Appearance	Colourless liquid
Odor	benzene-like
Density	0.859 g/cm^{3}
Melting point	−111.9 °C (−169.4 °F; 161.2 K)
Boiling point	35 °C (95 °F; 308 K)
Solubility in water	41% (20 °C)
Vapor pressure	445 mmHg (20 °C)
Magnetic susceptibility (χ)	−4.25×10^{−5} cm^{3}/mol
Refractive index (n_{D})	1.3660

Thermochemistry
Heat capacity (C)	120.4 J·(K·mol)^{−1}
Std molar entropy (S^{⦵}_{298})	196.5 J·(K·mol)^{−1}
Std enthalpy of formation (Δ_{f}H^{⦵}_{298})	−123.0 kJ·mol^{−1}

Hazards
- Occupational safety and health (OHS/OSH)
Main hazards	Extremely flammable
- GHS labelling
Pictograms	(GHS02: Flammable) (GHS08: Health hazard) (GHS07: Exclamation mark)
Signal word	Danger
NFPA 704 (fire diamond)	3 4 2
Flash point	−37 °C (−35 °F; 236 K)
Autoignition temperature	747 °C (1,377 °F; 1,020 K)
Explosive limits	2.3–36%
- Lethal dose or concentration (LD, LC)
LD_{50} (median dose)	660 mg/kg (guinea pig, oral); 380 mg/kg (rat, oral); 440 mg/kg (mouse, oral); 1140 mg/kg (rat, oral); 690 mg/kg (guinea pig, oral)
LC_{50} (median concentration)	1740 ppm (mouse, 4 h); 4000 ppm (rat, 4 h)
LC_{Lo} (lowest published)	2005 ppm (dog, 4 h); 4000 ppm (guinea pig, 4 h)
- NIOSH (US health exposure limits)
PEL (Permissible)	TWA 100 ppm (240 mg/m^{3})
REL (Recommended)	Ca
IDLH (Immediate danger)	Ca [400 ppm]
- Except where otherwise noted, data are given for materials in their standard state (at 25 °C [77 °F], 100 kPa). verify (what is ?) Infobox references

Propylene oxide is an epoxide with the molecular formula C_{3}H_{6}O. This colourless volatile liquid with an odour similar to ether, is produced on a large scale industrially. Its major application is its use for the production of polyether polyols for use in making polyurethane plastics. It is a chiral epoxide, although it is commonly used as a racemic mixture.

This compound is sometimes called 1,2-propylene oxide to distinguish it from its isomer 1,3-propylene oxide, better known as oxetane.

== Production ==
Industrial production of propylene oxide starts from propylene. Two general approaches are employed, one involving chlorohydrin formation and the other involving oxidation. In 2005, about half of the world production was through chlorohydrin technology and one half via oxidation routes. The latter approach is growing in importance.

=== Chlorohydrin route ===
The traditional route proceeds via the conversion of propylene to propylene chlorohydrin according to the following simplified scheme:

The mixture of 1-chloro-2-propanol and 2-chloro-1-propanol then undergoes internal cyclization. For example:

Lime (calcium hydroxide) is often used to absorb the HCl.

=== Oxidation of propylene ===
The other general route to propylene oxide involves oxidation of propylene with an organic peroxide. The reaction follows this stoichiometry:

CH_{3}CH=CH_{2} + RO_{2}H → CH_{3}CHCH_{2}O + ROH

The process is practiced with four hydroperoxides:

- In the Halcon process, t-Butyl hydroperoxide derived from oxygenation of isobutane, which affords t-butanol. This coproduct can be dehydrated to isobutene, converted to MTBE, an additive for gasoline.
- Ethylbenzene hydroperoxide, derived from oxygenation of ethylbenzene, which affords 1-phenylethanol. This coproduct can be dehydrated to give styrene, a useful monomer.
- Cumene hydroperoxide derived from oxygenation of cumene (isopropylbenzene), which affords cumyl alcohol. Via dehydration and hydrogenation this coproduct can be recycled back to cumene. This technology was commercialized by Sumitomo Chemical.
- Hydrogen peroxide is the oxidant in the hydrogen peroxide to propylene oxide (HPPO) process, catalyzed by a titanium-doped silicalite:
  C_{3}H_{6} + H_{2}O_{2} → C_{3}H_{6}O + H_{2}O

In principle, this process produces only water as a side product. In practice, some ring-opened derivatives of PO are generated.

Propylene oxide is chiral building block that is commercially available in either enantiomeric form ((R)-(+) and (S)-(–)). The separated enantiomers can be obtained through a Co(III)-salen-catalyzed hydrolytic kinetic resolution of the racemic material.

== Reactions ==
Like other epoxides, PO undergoes ring-opening reactions. With water, propylene glycol is produced. With alcohols, reactions, called hydroxylpropylation, analogous to ethoxylation occur. Grignard reagents add to propylene oxide to give secondary alcohols.

Some other reactions of propylene oxide include:

- Reaction with aluminium oxide at 250–260 °C leads to propionaldehyde and a little acetone.
- Reaction with silver(I) oxide leads to acetic acid.
- Reaction with sodium–mercury amalgam and water leads to isopropanol.

== Uses ==
Between 60 and 70% of all propylene oxide is converted to polyether polyols by the process called alkoxylation. These polyols are building blocks in the production of polyurethane plastics. About 20% of propylene oxide is hydrolyzed into propylene glycol, via a process which is accelerated by acid or base catalysis. Another major products is propylene carbonate.

=== Niche uses ===
==== Fumigant ====
The United States Food and Drug Administration has approved the use of propylene oxide to pasteurize raw almonds beginning on September 1, 2007, in response to two incidents of contamination by Salmonella in commercial orchards, one incident occurring in Canada and one in the United States. Pistachio nuts can also be subjected to propylene oxide to control Salmonella.

==== Microscopy ====
Propylene oxide is commonly used in the preparation of biological samples for electron microscopy, to remove residual ethanol previously used for dehydration. In a typical procedure, the sample is first immersed in a mixture of equal volumes of ethanol and propylene oxide for 5 minutes, and then four times in pure oxide, 10 minutes each.

==== Munition ====
Propylene oxide is sometimes used in thermobaric munitions as the fuel in fuel–air explosives. In addition to the explosive damage from the blast wave, unexploded propylene oxide can cause additional effects from direct toxicity.

== Safety ==
Propylene oxide is both acutely toxic and carcinogenic. Acute exposure causes respiratory tract irritation, eventually leading to death. Signs of toxicity after acute exposure include salivation, lacrimation, nasal discharge, gasping, lethargy and hypoactivity, weakness, and incoordination. Propylene oxide is also neurotoxic in rats, and presumably in humans. Propylene oxide alkylates DNA and is considered a mutagen for both animals and humans. Pregnant rats exposed to 500ppm of propylene oxide for less than 8 hours gave birth to litters with significant deformities and weight deficiencies. Similar exposure has also shown to reduce animal fertility. As such, it is a known animal carcinogen and potential human carcinogen, and is included into the List of IARC Group 2B carcinogens.

Propylene oxide is an extremely flammable liquid, and its vapors can form explosive mixtures with air at concentrations as low as 2.3% (Lower Explosive Limit). Propylene oxide vapor is twice as dense as air. When exposed to an open atmosphere, the vapor can accumulate in low-lying areas while spreading out over long distances and reach ignition source, causing flashback or an explosion. When heated, propylene oxide can rapidly self-polymerize and decompose producing other toxic gases such as carbon monoxide and various free radicals. Propylene oxide fires are especially dangerous and difficult for firefighters to extinguish. In a fire, sealed tanks of propylene oxide should be cooled with fire hoses to prevent explosion from self-polymerization. When burning in open air however, water can transport propylene oxide outside of the fire zone which can reignite upon floating to the surface. Additional firefighting measures should be taken to prevent propylene oxide from washing out to nearby drains and sewers contaminating the surrounding environment.

== Natural occurrence ==
In 2016 it was reported that propylene oxide was detected in Sagittarius B2, a cloud of gas in the Milky Way weighing three million solar masses. It is the first chiral molecule to be detected in space, albeit with no enantiomeric excess.

== Cited sources ==
- Haynes WM, ed. (2011). CRC Handbook of Chemistry and Physics (92nd ed.). Boca Raton, Florida: CRC Press. ISBN 1-4398-5511-0.
