= Corey–Link reaction =

In organic chemistry, the Corey–Link reaction is a name reaction that converts a 1,1,1-trichloro-2-keto structure into a 2-aminocarboxylic acid (an alpha amino acid) or other acyl functional group with control of the chirality at the alpha position. The reaction is named for E.J. Corey and John Link, who first reported the reaction sequence.

== Process ==
The first stage of the process is the reduction of the carbonyl to give a 1,1,1-trichloro-2-hydroxy structure. The original protocol used catecholborane with a small amount of one enantiomer of CBS catalyst (a Corey–Itsuno reduction). The choice of chirality of the catalyst thus gives selectivity for one or the other stereochemistry of the alcohol, which subsequently controls the stereochemistry of the amino substituent in the ultimate product.

This 2-hydroxy structure then undergoes a Jocic–Reeve reaction using azide as the nucleophile. The multistep reaction mechanism begins with deprotonation of the alcohol, followed by the oxygen-anion attacking the adjacent trichloromethyl position to form an epoxide. The azide then opens this ring by an S_{N}2 reaction to give a 2-azido structure whose stereochemistry is inverted compared to the original 2-hydroxy. The oxygen, having become attached to the first carbon of the chain during the epoxide formation, simultaneously displaces a second chlorine atom there to form an acyl chloride. An additional nucleophilic reactant, such as hydroxide or an alkoxide, then triggers an acyl substitution to produce a carboxylic acid or ester. Various other nucleophiles can be used to generate other acyl functional groups. This sequence of steps gives a 2-azido compound, which is then reduced to the 2-amino compound in a separate reaction, typically a Staudinger reaction.

== Bargellini reaction ==
The Bargellini reaction involves the same type of dichloroepoxy intermediate, formed by a different method, that reacts with a single structure containing two nucleophilic groups. It thus gives products such as morpholinones or piperazinones, alpha-amino esters or amides in which the amine is tethered to the acyl substituent group.
