= Ethyl hydroperoxide =

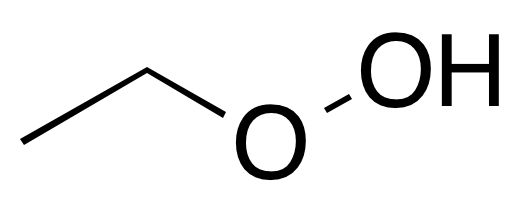

Names
- IUPAC name Ethaneperoxol
- Other names Hydroperoxide, ethyl Ethane hydroperoxide Ethyl hydrogen peroxide Hydroperoxyethane

Identifiers
CAS Number	3031-74-1
3D model (JSmol)	Interactive image
ChemSpider	56252
ECHA InfoCard	100.019.284
EC Number	221-211-6
PubChem CID	62472
UNII	08608DV9AD
CompTox Dashboard (EPA)	DTXSID70184402
- InChI: InChI=1S/C2H6O2/c1-2-4-3/h3H,2H2,1H3 Key: ILHIHKRJJMKBEE-UHFFFAOYSA-N
- SMILES: CCOO

Properties
Chemical formula	C_{2}H_{6}O_{2}
Molar mass	62.068 g·mol^{−1}
Appearance	colorless liquid
Melting point	−100 °C (−148 °F; 173 K)
Boiling point	95 °C (203 °F; 368 K)
Solubility in water	Miscible in water and diethyl ether
- Except where otherwise noted, data are given for materials in their standard state (at 25 °C [77 °F], 100 kPa). Infobox references

Ethyl hydroperoxide is the organic compound with the formula CH_{3}CH_{2}OOH. It is a colorless liquid that is miscible with water and diethyl ether.

== Formation ==
Ethyl hydroperoxide is formed in the flame of burning alkanes. Ethyl hydroperoxide is also formed in the catalytic reaction of ethane and hydrogen peroxide. Yet another way to form ethyl hydroperoxide is by a photocatalytic oxidation of ethane:

CH_{3}CH_{3} + O_{2} → CH_{3}CH_{2}OOH
