= Propylene chlorohydrin =

Names
- Preferred IUPAC name 1-Chloropropan-2-ol
- Other names 1-Chloro-2-hydroxypropane

Identifiers
CAS Number	(isomer: 78-89-7) 127-00-4 (isomer: 78-89-7)
3D model (JSmol)	Interactive image
ChemSpider	29103
ECHA InfoCard	100.004.382
EC Number	204-819-6 2.3.5UN Number New Window 2611 CHEBI:76260 CHEMBL1361129
PubChem CID	31370
UNII	ZL0FUS96WW
CompTox Dashboard (EPA)	DTXSID5020285
- InChI: InChI=1S/C3H7ClO/c1-3(5)2-4/h3,5H,2H2,1H3 Key: YYTSGNJTASLUOY-UHFFFAOYSA-N
- SMILES: CC(CCl)O

Properties
Chemical formula	C_{3}H_{7}ClO
Molar mass	94.54
Appearance	colorless liquid
Density	1.1154 g/mL
Boiling point	127°C

Hazards
- GHS labelling
Pictograms	(GHS02: Flammable) (GHS07: Exclamation mark)
Signal word	Warning
Hazard statements	H226, H302, H315, H319, H332, H335
Precautionary statements	P210, P233, P240, P241, P242, P243, P261, P264, P270, P271, P280, P301+P312, P302+P352, P303+P361+P353, P304+P312, P304+P340, P305+P351+P338, P312, P321, P330, P332+P313, P337+P313, P362, P370+P378, P403+P233, P403+P235, P405, P501
- Except where otherwise noted, data are given for materials in their standard state (at 25 °C [77 °F], 100 kPa). Infobox references

Propylene chlorohydrin usually refers to the organic compound with the formula CH_{3}CH(OH)CH_{2}Cl. A related compound, an isomer, is CH_{3}CH(Cl)CH_{2}OH. Both isomers are colorless liquids that are soluble in organic solvents. They are classified as chlorohydrins. Both are generated on a large scale as intermediates in the production of propylene oxide.

The reaction of aqueous solution of chlorine with propene gives a 10:1 ratio of CH_{3}CH(OH)CH_{2}Cl and CH_{3}CH(Cl)CH_{2}OH. These compounds are treated with lime to give propylene oxide, which is useful in the production of plastics and other polymers.
