= Jocic reaction =

Chemical reaction

Named after	Zivojin Jocic; Wilkins Reeve
Reaction type	Substitution reaction

Identifiers
Organic Chemistry Portal	jocic-reaction

In organic chemistry, the Jocic reaction, also called the Jocic–Reeve reaction (named after Zivojin Jocic and Wilkins Reeve) is a name reaction that generates α-substituted carboxylic acids from trichloromethylcarbinols and corresponding nucleophiles in the presence of sodium hydroxide. The reaction involves nucleophilic displacement of the hydroxyl group in a 1,1,1-trichloro-2-hydroxyalkyl structure with concomitant conversion of the trichloromethyl portion to a carboxylic acid or other acyl group.

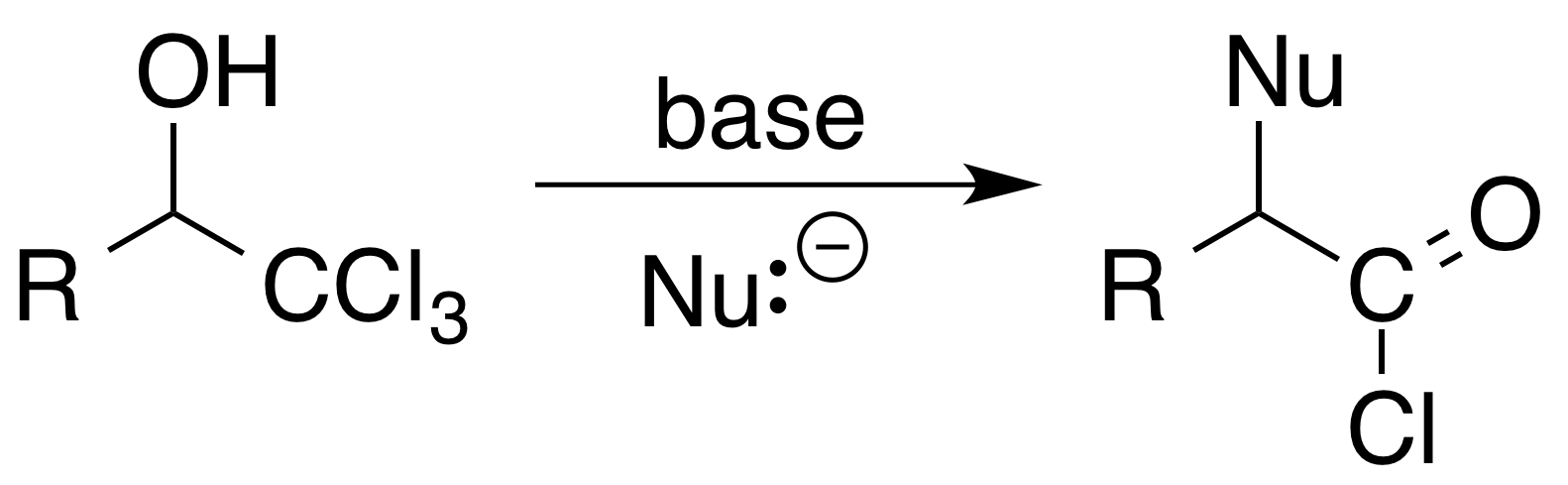

The key stages of the reaction involve an S_{N}2 reaction, where the nucleophile displaces the oxygen with geometric inversion.

== Mechanism ==
The reaction mechanism involves an epoxide intermediate that undergoes an S_{N}2 reaction by the nucleophile. As a result of this mechanistic aspect, the reaction can easily occur on secondary or tertiary positions, and chiral products can be made by using chiral alcohol substrates. The reaction is one stage of the Corey–Link reaction, the Bargellini reaction, and other processes for synthesizing α-amino acids and related structures. Using hydride as the nucleophile, which also reduces the carbonyl of the product, allows this sequence to be used as a homologation reaction for primary alcohols.

== Scope ==
Examples of this reaction include:
Generation of α-azidocarboxylic acids with the use of sodium azide as the nucleophile in DME with the presence of sodium hydroxide.
Conversion of aldehydes to homoelongated carboxylic acids, by first reacting with trichloromethide to form a trichloromethylcarbinol, then undergoing a Jocic reaction with either sodium borohydride or sodium phenylseleno(triethoxy)borate as the nucleophile in sodium hydroxide. This reaction can be followed by the introduction of an amine, to form the corresponding homoelongated amides.
