= Hydroperoxide =

Class of chemical compounds

The general structure of an organic hydroperoxide with the blue marked functional group, where R stands for any group, typically organic

Hydroperoxides or peroxols are compounds of the form ROOH, where R stands for any group, typically organic, which contain the hydroperoxy (also known as perhydroxyl) functional group (−OOH). Hydroperoxide also refers to the hydroperoxide anion (^{−}OOH) (also known as perhydroxyl anion) and its salts, and the neutral hydroperoxyl radical (•OOH) consist of an unbound hydroperoxy group. When R is organic, the compounds are called organic hydroperoxides. Such compounds are a subset of organic peroxides, which have the formula ROOR. Organic hydroperoxides can either intentionally or unintentionally initiate explosive polymerisation in materials with saturated chemical bonds.

== Properties ==
The O−O bond length in hydroperoxides is about 1.45 Å. The R−O−O angles (R = H, C) are about 110° (water-like). Characteristically, the C−O−O−H dihedral angles are about 120°. The O−O bond is relatively weak, with a bond dissociation energy of 45–50 kcal/mol (190–210 kJ/mol), less than half the strengths of C−C, C−H, and C−O bonds.

Hydroperoxides are typically more volatile than the corresponding alcohols:

- tert-BuOOH (b.p. 36 °C) vs tert-BuOH (b.p. 82-83 °C)
- CH_{3}OOH (b.p. 46 °C) vs CH_{3}OH (b.p. 65 °C)
- cumene hydroperoxide (b.p. 153 °C) vs cumyl alcohol (b.p. 202 °C)
- (C_{6}H_{5})_{3}COOH (m.p. 87.5–88.5 °C) is a particularly stable example of a hydroperoxide

== Miscellaneous reactions ==
Hydroperoxides are mildly acidic. The pKa range is indicated by 11.5 for CH_{3}OOH to 13.1 for Ph_{3}COOH.

Hydroperoxides can be reduced to alcohols with lithium aluminium hydride, as described in this idealized equation:

4 ROOH + LiAlH_{4} → LiAlO_{2} + 2 H_{2}O + 4 ROH

This reaction is the basis of methods for analysis of organic peroxides. Another way to evaluate the content of peracids and peroxides is the volumetric titration with alkoxides such as sodium ethoxide. The phosphite esters and tertiary phosphines also effect reduction:

ROOH + PR_{3} → OPR_{3} + ROH

== Uses ==
=== Precursors to epoxides ===
"The single most important synthetic application of alkyl hydroperoxides is without doubt the metal-catalysed epoxidation of alkenes." In the Halcon process tert-butyl hydroperoxide (TBHP) is employed for the production of propylene oxide.

Of specialized interest, chiral epoxides are prepared using hydroperoxides as reagents in the Sharpless epoxidation.

The Sharpless epoxidation

=== Production of cyclohexanone and caprolactone ===
Hydroperoxides are intermediates in the production of many organic compounds in industry. For example, the cobalt catalyzed oxidation of cyclohexane to cyclohexanone:

C_{6}H_{12} + O_{2} → (CH_{2})_{5}C=O + H_{2}O

Drying oils, as found in many paints and varnishes, function via the formation of hydroperoxides.

==== Hock processes ====
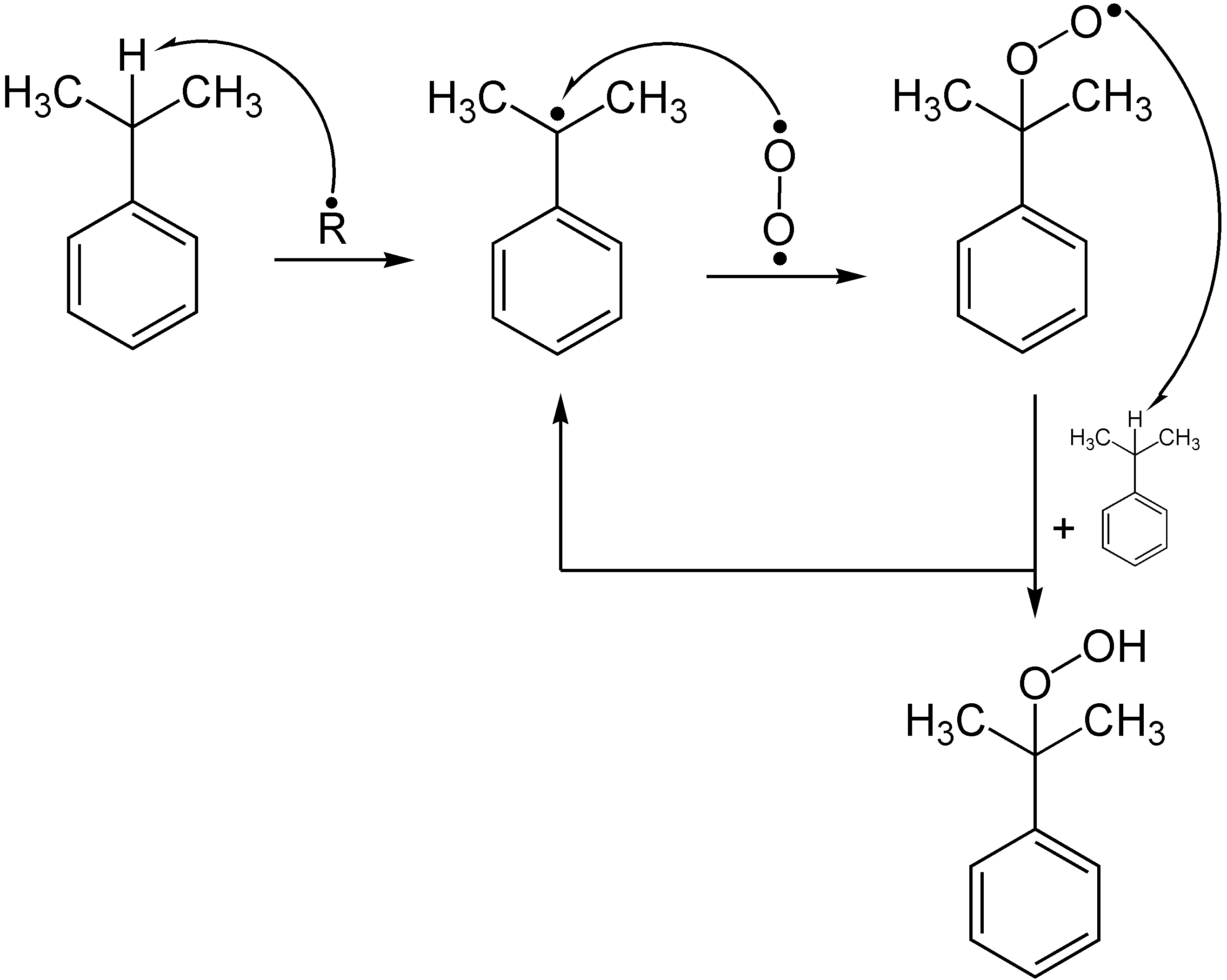
Synthesis of cumene hydroperoxide

Compounds with allylic and benzylic C−H bonds are especially susceptible to oxygenation. Such reactivity is exploited industrially on a large scale for the production of phenol by the Cumene process or Hock process for its cumene and cumene hydroperoxide intermediates. Such reactions rely on radical initiators that reacts with oxygen to form an intermediate that abstracts a hydrogen atom from a weak C-H bond. The resulting radical binds O_{2}, to give hydroperoxyl (ROO•), which then continues the cycle of H-atom abstraction.

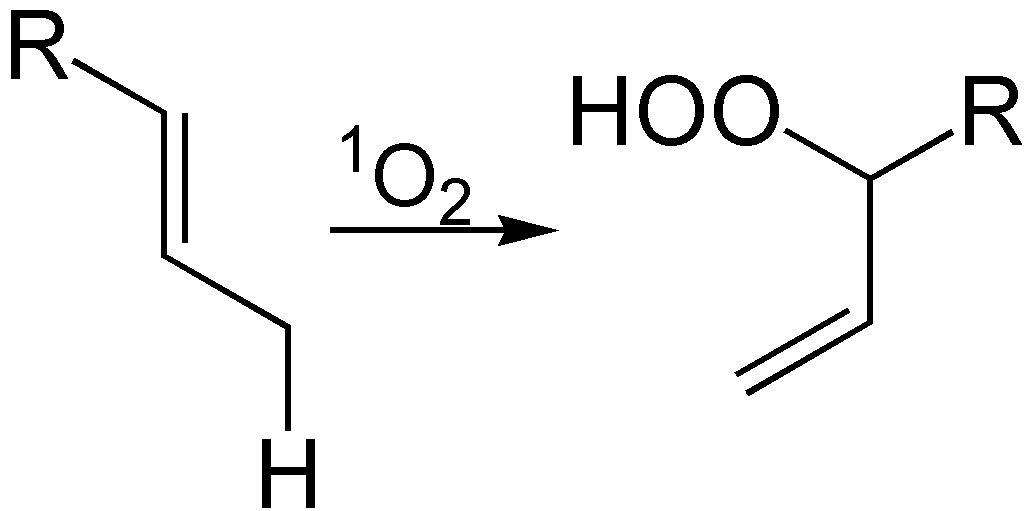
Synthesis of hydroperoxides of alkene and singlet oxygen in an Schenck ene reaction

== Formation ==
=== By autoxidation ===
The most important (in a commercial sense) peroxides are produced by autoxidation, the direct reaction of O_{2} with a hydrocarbon. Autoxidation is a radical reaction that begins with the abstraction of an H atom from a relatively weak C-H bond. Important compounds made in this way include tert-butyl hydroperoxide, cumene hydroperoxide and ethylbenzene hydroperoxide:

R−H + O_{2} → R−OOH

Auto-oxidation reaction is also observed with common ethers, such as diethyl ether, diisopropyl ether, tetrahydrofuran, and 1,4-dioxane. An illustrative product is diethyl ether peroxide. Such compounds can result in a serious explosion when distilled. To minimize this problem, commercial samples of THF are often inhibited with butylated hydroxytoluene (BHT). Distillation of THF to dryness is avoided because the explosive peroxides concentrate in the residue.

Although ether hydroperoxide often form adventitiously (i.e. autoxidation), they can be prepared in high yield by the acid-catalyzed addition of hydrogen peroxide to vinyl ethers:

C_{2}H_{5}OCH=CH_{2} + H_{2}O_{2} → C_{2}H_{5}OCH(OOH)CH_{3}

=== From hydrogen peroxide ===
Many industrial peroxides are produced using hydrogen peroxide. Reactions with aldehydes and ketones yield a series of compounds depending on conditions. Specific reactions include addition of hydrogen peroxide across the C=O double bond:

R_{2}C=O + H_{2}O_{2} → R_{2}C(OH)OOH

In some cases, these hydroperoxides convert to give cyclic diperoxides:

[R_{2}C(O_{2}H)]_{2}O_{2} → [R_{2}C]_{2}(O_{2})_{2} + 2 H_{2}O

Addition of this initial adduct to a second equivalent of the carbonyl:

R_{2}C=O + R_{2}C(OH)OOH → [R_{2}C(OH)]_{2}O_{2}

Further replacement of alcohol groups:

[R_{2}C(OH)]_{2}O_{2} + 2 H_{2}O_{2} → [R_{2}C(O_{2}H)]_{2}O_{2} + 2 H_{2}O

Triphenylmethanol reacts with hydrogen peroxide in the presence of acid to give the hydroperoxide:

(C_{6}H_{5})_{3}COH + H_{2}O_{2} → (C_{6}H_{5})_{3}COOH + H_{2}O

=== Naturally occurring hydroperoxides ===
Many hydroperoxides are derived from fatty acids, steroids, and terpenes. The biosynthesis of these species is affected extensively by enzymes.

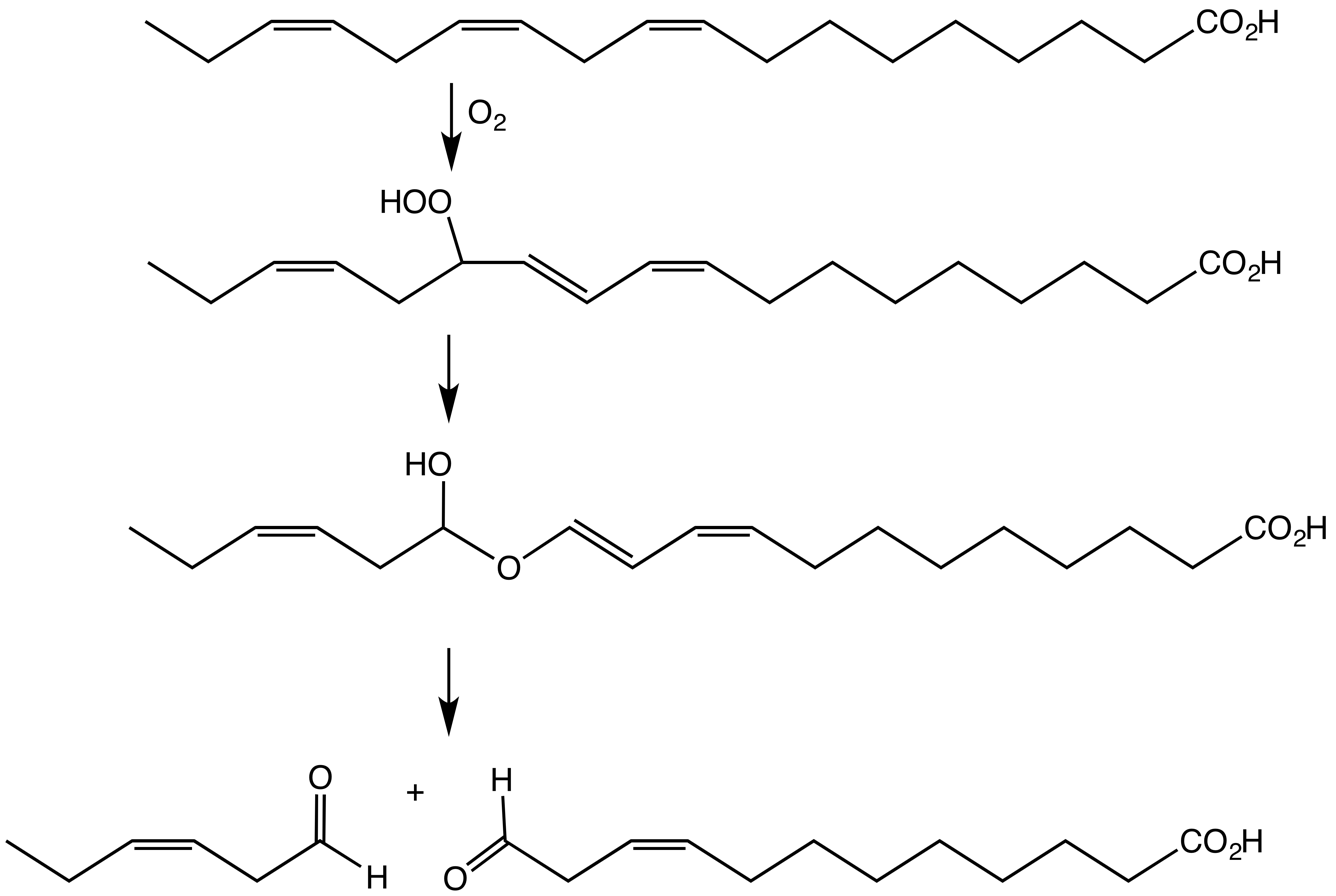
Illustrative biosynthetic transformation involving a hydroperoxide. Here cis-3-hexenal is generated by conversion of linolenic acid to the hydroperoxide by the action of a lipoxygenase followed by the lyase-induced formation of the hemiacetal.

In the remote troposphere, hydrogen peroxide (H₂O₂) and methyl hydroperoxide (CH₃OOH) are among the most abundant hydroperoxides and act as reservoirs for HOx (OH + HO₂), buffering radical concentrations and tracing oxidation chemistry. Formation in the remote troposphere is dominated by peroxy-radical chemistry:

HO₂ + HO₂ → H₂O₂ + O₂ and CH₃O₂ + HO₂ → CH₃OOH + O₂

Global aircraft observations during NASA's Atmospheric Tomography (ATom) mission show that their distributions reflect formation via peroxy-radical chemistry and are modulated by season and recent convection.

Under atmospheric conditions, the reaction of organic peroxyl radicals (RO₂) with HO₂—an important source of ROOH—exhibits a generally negative temperature dependence, and its product branching competes with RO₂ autoxidation (isomerization) and RO₂+RO₂ channels. Many functionalized RO₂ types (for example, β-hydroxy or highly oxygenated RO₂) still lack good laboratory data on rates and products. Because of that, the predicted ROOH yields—and how they change with temperature—remain uncertain.

== Inorganic hydroperoxides ==
Structure of a square planar palladium hydroperoxide complex

Although hydroperoxide often refers to a class of organic compounds, many inorganic or metallo-organic compounds are hydroperoxides. One example involves sodium perborate, a commercially important bleaching agent with the formula Na_{2}[(HO)_{2}B]_{2}(OO)_{2})]. It acts by hydrolysis to give a boron-hydroperoxide:

[(HO)_{2}B]_{2}(OO)_{2})^{2−} + 2 H_{2}O ⇌ 2 [(HO)_{3}B(OOH)]^{−}

This hydrogen peroxide then releases hydrogen peroxide:

[(HO)_{3}B(OOH)]^{−} + H_{2}O ⇌ B(OH)^{−}_{4} + H_{2}O_{2}

Several metal hydroperoxide complexes have been characterized by X-ray crystallography, for example: triphenylsilicon and triphenylgermanium hydroperoxides can be obtained by reaction of initial chlorides with excess of hydrogen peroxide in presence of base. Some form by the reaction of metal hydrides with oxygen gas:

L_{n}M−H + O_{2} → L_{n}M−O−O−H (L_{n} refers to other ligands bound to the metal)

Some transition metal dioxygen complexes abstract H atoms (and sometimes protons) to give hydroperoxides:

L_{n}M(O_{2}) + H → L_{n}MOOH
