= Halcon process =

In chemistry, the Halcon process refers to technology for the production of propylene oxide by oxidation of propylene with tert-butyl hydroperoxide. The reaction requires metal catalysts, which typically contain molybdenum:

(CH_{3})_{3}COOH + CH_{2}=CHCH_{3} → (CH_{3})_{3}COH + CH_{2}OCHCH_{3}

The byproduct tert-butanol is recycled or converted to other useful compounds. The process once operated at the scale of >2 billion kg/y.

The lighter analogue of propylene oxide, ethylene oxide, is produced by silver-catalyzed reaction of ethylene with oxygen. Attempts to implement this relatively simple technology to the conversion of propylene to propylene oxide fail. Instead only combustion predominates. The problems are attributed to the sensitivity of allylic C-H bonds.

== Mechanism ==
The oxidation is thought to proceed by formation of Mo(η^{2}-O_{2}-tert-Bu) complexes. The peroxy O center is rendered highly electrophilic, leading to attack on the alkene.

== History ==
The Halcon process was developed by Halcon International.
