= Tert-Butyl hydroperoxide =

tert-Butyl hydroperoxide

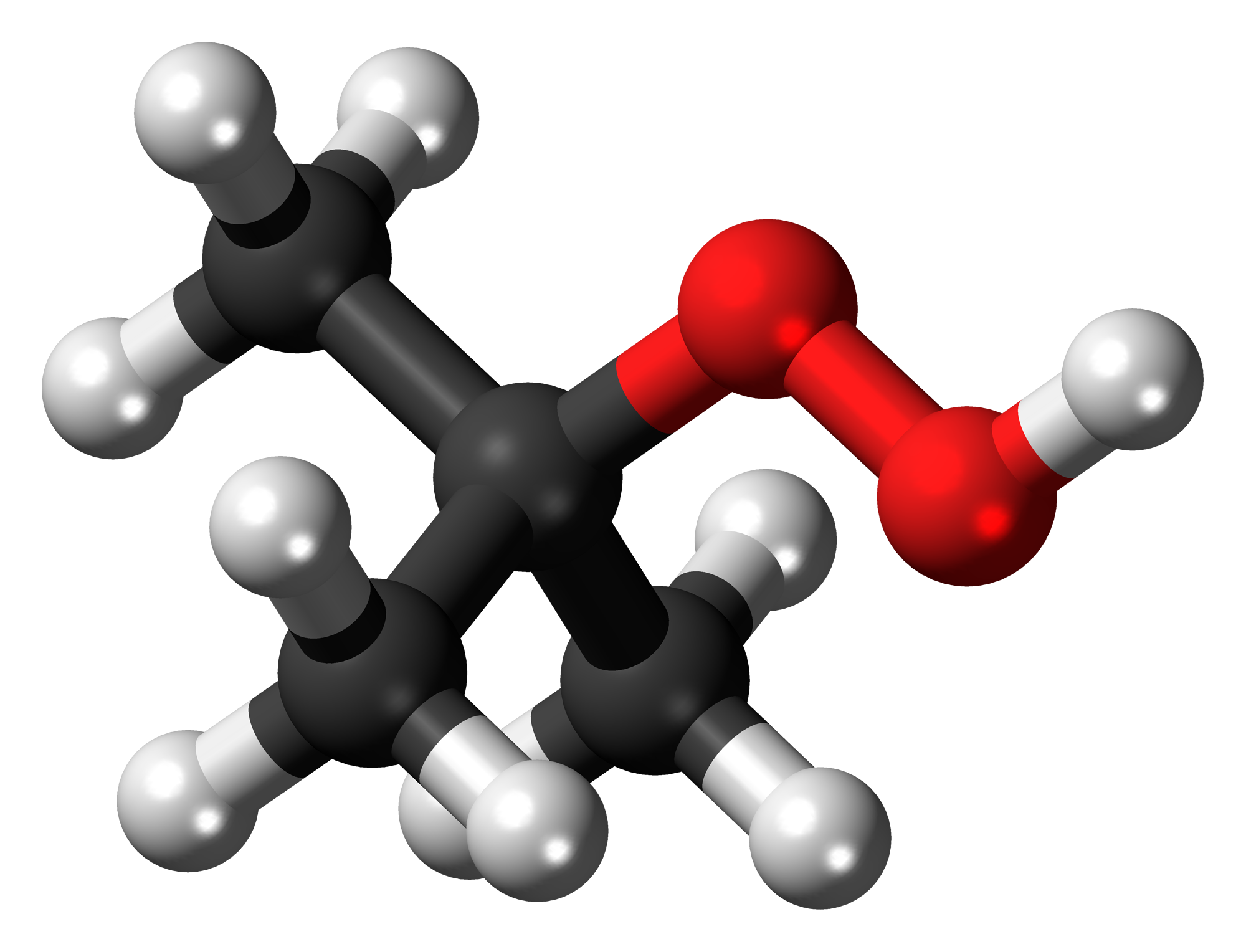

Names
- Preferred IUPAC name 2-Methylpropane-2-peroxol
- Systematic IUPAC name tert-Butyl hydroperoxide

Identifiers
CAS Number	75-91-2
3D model (JSmol)	Interactive image
Abbreviations	TBHP
Beilstein Reference	1098280
ChEMBL	ChEMBL348399
ChemSpider	6170
ECHA InfoCard	100.000.833
EC Number	200-915-7
MeSH	tert-Butylhydroperoxide
PubChem CID	6410
RTECS number	EQ4900000
UNII	955VYL842B
UN number	3109
CompTox Dashboard (EPA)	DTXSID9024693
- InChI: InChI=1S/C4H10O2/c1-4(2,3)6-5/h5H,1-3H3 Key: CIHOLLKRGTVIJN-UHFFFAOYSA-N
- SMILES: CC(C)(C)OO

Properties
Chemical formula	C_{4}H_{10}O_{2}
Molar mass	90.122 g·mol^{−1}
Appearance	Colorless liquid
Density	0.935 g/mL
Melting point	−3 °C (27 °F; 270 K)
Boiling point	37 °C (99 °F; 310 K) at 2.0 kPa
Solubility in water	miscible
log P	1.23
Acidity (pK_{a})	12.69
Basicity (pK_{b})	1.31
Refractive index (n_{D})	1.3870

Thermochemistry
Std enthalpy of formation (Δ_{f}H^{⦵}_{298})	−294±5 kJ/mol
Std enthalpy of combustion (Δ_{c}H^{⦵}_{298})	2.710±0.005 MJ/mol

Hazards
- Occupational safety and health (OHS/OSH)
Main hazards	oxidizer
- GHS labelling
Pictograms	(GHS02: Flammable) (GHS03: Oxidizing) (GHS05: Corrosive) (GHS06: Toxic) (GHS08: Health hazard) (GHS09: Environmental hazard)
Signal word	Danger
Hazard statements	H226, H242, H302, H311, H314, H317, H331, H341, H411
Precautionary statements	P220, P261, P273, P280, P305+P351+P338, P310
NFPA 704 (fire diamond)	4 4 4 OX
Flash point	43 °C (109 °F; 316 K)
- Safety data sheet (SDS)
- Except where otherwise noted, data are given for materials in their standard state (at 25 °C [77 °F], 100 kPa). verify (what is ?) Infobox references

tert-Butyl hydroperoxide (tBuOOH) is the organic compound with the formula (CH_{3})_{3}COOH. It is one of the most widely used hydroperoxides in a variety of oxidation processes, like the Halcon process. It is normally supplied as a 69–70% aqueous solution. Compared to hydrogen peroxide and organic peracids, tert-butyl hydroperoxide is less reactive and more soluble in organic solvents. Overall, it is renowned for the convenient handling properties of its solutions. Its solutions in organic solvents are highly stable.

== Application ==
Industrially, tert-butyl hydroperoxide is used to prepare propylene oxide. In the Halcon process, molybdenum-based catalysts are used for this reaction:

(CH_{3})_{3}COOH + CH_{2}=CHCH_{3} → (CH_{3})_{3}COH + CH_{2}OCHCH_{3}

The byproduct t-butanol can be dehydrated to isobutene and converted to MTBE.

On a much smaller scale, tert-butyl hydroperoxide is used to produce some fine chemicals by the Sharpless epoxidation.

== Synthesis and production ==
Many synthetic routes are available, e.g. by the auto-oxidation of isobutane.

== Safety ==
tert-butyl hydroperoxide is potentially dangerous, but explosions are rare.

A solution of tert-butyl hydroperoxide and water with a concentration of greater than 90% is forbidden to be shipped according to US Department of Transportation Hazardous Materials Table 49 CFR 172.101.

In some sources it also has an NFPA 704 rating of 4 for health, 4 for flammability, 4 for reactivity and is a potent oxidant, however another source claims a lower rating of 1-4-4.

== See also ==
- Di-tert-butyl peroxide
