= Dillo (disambiguation) =

Dillo is a web browser.

Dillo may also refer to:

== Places ==
- Dillo (woreda), a district in Ethiopia
- Dillo, a river in Chile

== People ==
- Dillo Lombardi (1858-1938), Italian film director

== Venues ==
- The 'Dillo (1970–1980), nickname for a bygone Texas music hall in Austin, Armadillo World Headquarters

== See also ==
- Dillo Day, American music festival
- Dillo Dirt, compost made by the city of Austin, United States
