= Jacqui Horswell =

Environmental microbiologist

Jacqueline Horswell
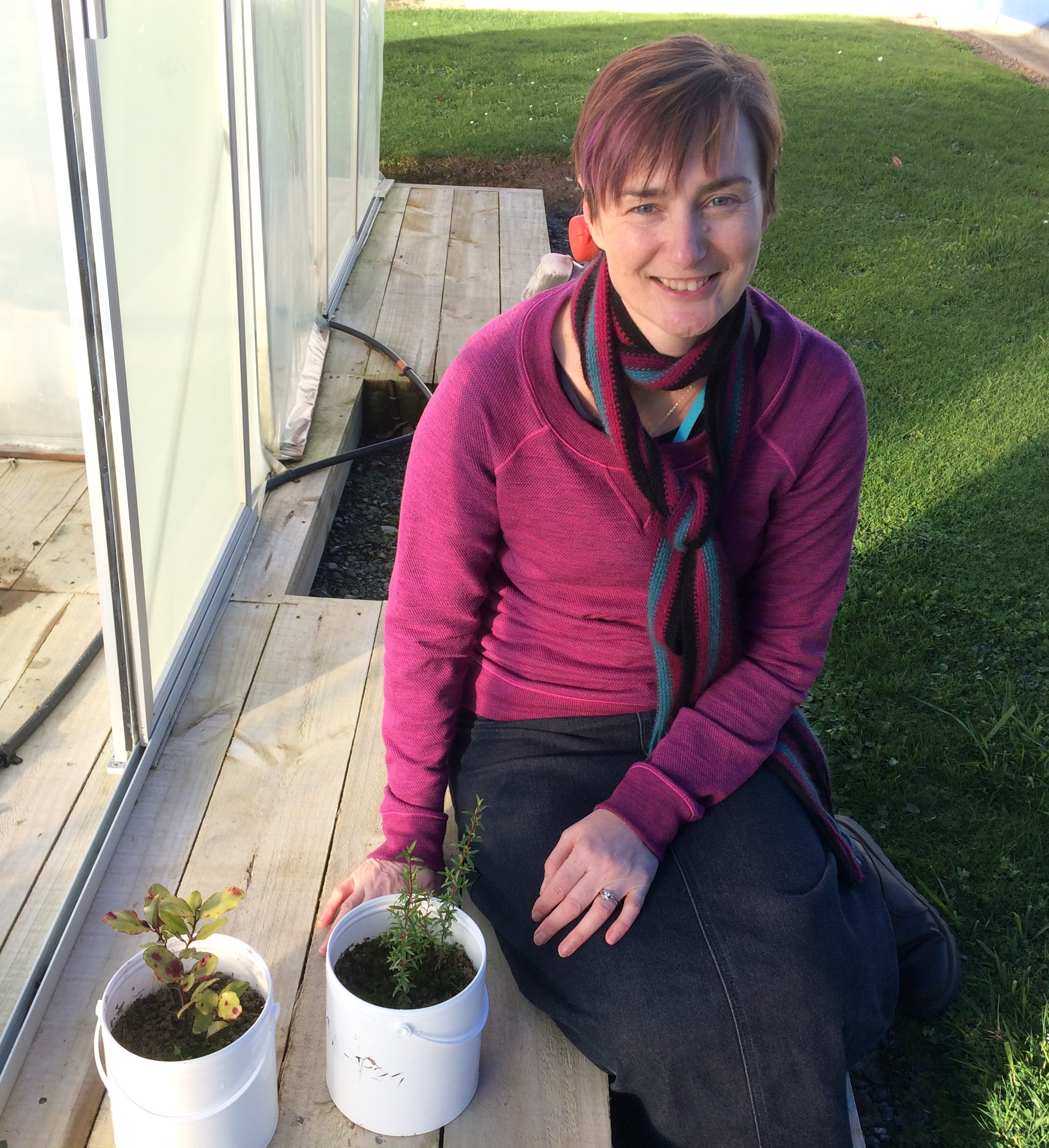
- Born: England
- Other name: Jacqui Horswell
- Education: University of Aberdeen
- Scientific career
- Fields: Environmental microbiology, forensic science
- Workplaces: Institute of Environmental Science and Research
- Thesis: Investigation of approaches to accelerate atrazine mineralisation in soil (1997)

Jacqueline Horswell is an English-born New Zealand environmental microbiologist who specialises in research into the waste society produces, its effect on the environment, and how it can be managed. Her work focuses particularly on measuring the effect of microbial and chemical contaminants in sewage sludge and the safe reuse of biosolids as fertiliser by the planting of native trees to filter and inactivate pollutants from the sludge and the use of vermiculture. Horswell is involved in consultation with communities in New Zealand and has contributed to official guidelines for the management of biosolids. Her research has also provided information about soil microbial communities for forensic science using microbial cultures and DNA sequencing. Since 2018, Horswell has been a lecturer at Massey University.

== Education ==
Horswell completed an undergraduate biology degree at the University of Bath and PhD in microbiology at the University of Aberdeen in 1997. Her PhD thesis was titled Investigation of approaches to accelerate atrazine mineralisation in soil.

== Career ==
Horswell moved to New Zealand in 1997 and took up a position as Scientist, Environmental Health Effects, at the Institute of Environmental Science and Research (ESR). In 2008 she took over the biowaste programme at ESR, which later set up and ran the virtual Centre for Integrated Bio Waste Research (CIBR), a collaboration between ESR, Scion, Landcare Research and the Cawthron Institute, to study options for safely and sustainably reusing biodegradable waste. With Horswell as its first programme leader, CIBR was officially launched in 2013 with the purpose of researching how to deal with organic waste, "to make sure, that when it goes on land, this is done safely and does not impact the environment". In July 2018 Horswell left ESR, and her role as Programme Manager for CIBR to become a Senior Lecturer in Water and Waste in the school of Health Sciences at Massey University, Wellington.

== Early research ==
Before coming to New Zealand, Horswell worked with Professor Graeme Paton at the University of Aberdeen on biosensor technology involving organisms that can determine whether toxic material is present in soil and identify when sites may have been contaminated by industry or agriculture and when they have been cleaned up. Specifically used in the research was the soil bacterium Rhizobium which because it was sensitive to heavy metals in the soil, could indicate on a biosensor light whether or not the soil was healthy. She applied this knowledge early in her time with ESR, in particular determining the impact of heavy metals in sewage sludge on microbes in the soil.

In 2000 Horswell was commissioned to do a report for the New Zealand Ministry of Health, Ministry for the Environment and Industry on the bioavailability of organic forms of arsenic to plants, and ultimately people in the soil-plant-human route, as a result of its use in the treatment of timber. The report which was a review of the literature, concluded that because salts of copper, chromium and arsenic have been used in New Zealand on the preservation of wood, "treatment sites can become highly contaminated with these metals, especially arsenate".

== Managing biosolids in the environment ==
The possible re-use of biosolids as fertiliser has been a key area of study for Horswell and in 2008, she recommended research priorities to the 2008 Annual Conference of the New Zealand Land Treatment Collective. Some of the key recommendations for potential projects included: "Environmental fate of biosolids and effluent-borne pathogens in sewage treatment systems...[monitoring]...source control of nutrients i.e. washing powder etc...[determining the]...effect of emerging contaminants such as endocrine inhibitors and pharmaceuticals on the environment.

A 2009 study, in which Horswell was involved, investigated the degree that sludge-born pathogen organisms survive and are transported in soils and affect surrounding water. The paper noted the importance of sewage treatment and disposal in protecting a community from pathogens and that while sewage sludge is a valuable resource with plant nutrients that can be directly applied to land as fertiliser, and pathogen numbers are reduced during sludge processing, it is unlikely that they can be completely eliminated, and need to be controlled via "guidelines and regulations that set criteria for levels of pathogens, which are protective of the environment and human health."

In 2017, Horswell participated in research looking at the possible use of biosolids to reforest areas where the soil had been degraded. The thesis was that because many New Zealand native plant species thrive in low-fertility soils, they may respond well to biosolids which would, in turn, improve the soil microbial activity. The report concluded that after adding biosolids to the soil, all the NZ-native species showed either improved growth or an increase in nutrient status, but cautioned that further testing was required to investigate the possible long-term effects of this.

Horswell co-authored a research report that evaluated the evidence that blending biosolids with organic materials could reduce the environmental impact on the soils and concluded that while it is not always a viable solution, "combining biosolids with other organic wastes to rehabilitate degraded land remains a potentially practicable and sustainable management of these resources."

=== Planting of native trees ===
Horswell participated in research led by ESR scientist Jennifer Prosser in 2014 that explored the possibilities of growing plants with antiseptic properties in soils contaminated with waste, mitigating the release of microbial contaminants into the environment. After studying two myrtaceous plants, Leptospermum scoparium, and (Kunzea robusta), in this context, the researchers concluded that there was evidence that such plant species "may help reduce microbial contaminants in land-applied organic wastes." Reflecting later on the research, Horswell commented: "Discovering that mānuka’s antimicrobial properties could help with water pollution was an exciting moment. Mānuka seems to actively do something beyond just sieving out the pathogens, so if we were to plant it (or kānuka) along our waterways, as they used to do, we might see an improvement in the health of our rivers and lakes."

Following the release by the New Zealand Ministry for the Environment of Our Fresh Water 2017, which had concerns about the runoff of wastes into waterways, the work by Horswell and other scientists from ESR was acknowledged for providing information that would potentially enable the filtering nitrates and deactivation of pollutants to improve water quality.

In 2017 when a polluted New Zealand lake in Te Kauwhata became part of a collaborative manuka-planting research initiative to help restore the water quality, the project was tested in a laboratory by the Institute of Environmental Science and Research (ESR). Horswell said it was the first time this resource had come from the laboratory to the land and it was a step toward the restoration of the lake that had involved the whole community and research students from the USA.

=== Vermicomposting ===
Horswell has been involved in studies to evaluate the effectiveness of vermicomposting in reducing pathogens in biosolids while still retaining beneficial nutrients and organic carbon. One study, focused on a small rural settlement in New Zealand, had the aims of examining the biological and chemical property change over the time of vermicomposting, identifying useful indicators of timing compost maturity and the determination of whether vermicomposting could produce a high value, pathogen-free product for small communities interested in recycling or reusing their waste. The study concluded that "vermicomposting has the potential to transform septic tank waste into high-value compost as it is effective in stabilizing nutrients and reducing pathogens." Another research paper co-authored by Horswell in 2017, noted in the Abstract: "Biosolids can be a valuable fertilizer for agriculture and in ecological restoration, although there are concerns about contaminants. Earthworm activity, including vermicomposting of biosolids, may influence the efficacy of their use."

=== Wetlands treatment systems ===
In 2015 Horswell noted that CIBR and the National Institute of Water and Atmospheric Research (NIWA), had begun collaborating with the community and the Gisborne District Council to review the effectiveness of the Biological Trickling Filter (BTF) that had been in use in the area since 2011. They also investigated the potential for a wetlands treatment system, using native plant species, as an alternative method of disposal of the treated effluent and biosolids. In the same publication Staci Boyte explained that the eventual aim of the project was to eliminate the discharge of human effluent to the sea, but stressed the possibility of a "wetland treatment system and sludge drying beds to treat and re-use the waste, eliminating the discharge of waste to the sea and potentially provide a useful soil conditioner." The Gisborne Herald reported in December 2015, that good progress was being made with the trial and the next stage would be using algal ponds to determine if the system could be used to treat the wastewater after it had been through the Biological Trickling Filter BTF plant.

== Engaging with communities ==
Engaging with communities has driven much of the research for developing frameworks for the management of biowastes, and in 2016 Horswell co-authored a Community Engagement Framework for Biowastes to assist waste producers and councils to effectively consult with their communities about the discharge of biowastes to land in New Zealand. In this framework, biowastes are defined as "solid and liquid organic biodegradable waste, including biosolids, organic industrial waste, agricultural waste, kitchen/food waste, green waste, sewage effluent and greywater." The report noted that to get shared understandings and buy-in from stakeholders, social, cultural and economic factors all needed to be considered so that there was alignment between community values and the technicalities of the process. Some of the key guidelines for successful engagement included careful planning and scheduling, getting a good representation of stakeholders, in particular, inviting local Iwi representatives to become involved and ensure that there is "warm hosting and sharing of food."

Cultural views of Maori about the management of biowastes were published in a paper in March 2016. Horswell was part of the team that wrote this document to provide insight into how the traditional constructs of tapu and noa could be considered in biowaste management, in particular for biosolids. The purpose of the document was to "support local government staff and engineers in better understanding and incorporating Maori worldviews into biowaste management negotiations and solutions." In 2017, Horswell led another collaborative three-year project with councils that aimed to develop a collective biosolids strategy and use the programme in the lower North Island. The paper, co-authored by Horswell, did not see landfilling of biosolids as a viable long-term option and determined that the best approach was to identify the scale of the problem, explore opportunities to work together and assess feasible scenarios that could inform the implementation of an effective strategy. The aim was that this would provide a "basis for sustainable biosolids management in other regions of New Zealand, national guidelines and policy directions." The project was reviewed in 2020 and concluded it had shown that biosolids can be beneficially reused through collective management, noting that the keys to success are for Regional Councils to streamline consenting and the building of "positive relationships between Iwi and Council, and maintaining an understanding around wider issues occurring within the region that may have an influence on local Iwi's current perspectives." Horswell was one of the reviewers.

== Forensic science ==
Horswell's research has had implications for forensic science. In 2002, she contributed to an investigation that showed a soil microbial community DNA profile could be determined from a small sample of soil off shoes or clothing, and could potentially be used as "associative evidence to prove a link between suspects and crime scenes." New Zealand journalist Kim Griggs, writing in the Guardian, explained that once the DNA from the bacteria in the soil is extracted, a biological photocopier could be used by forensic scientists to make copies of the DNA of the 16S rRNA gene and look for matching samples at a given site, with the aim of solving crimes using an understanding of soil and the bugs within it as a new "fingerprint". As a result of this research, The University of Tennessee Forensic Anthropology Facility, which studies what happens to human bodies after they die, worked with ESR on studying the bacteria that the body produces as it decomposes, hypothesizing that certain bugs - either from the decomposing body or those already in the soil - will create a bacteria timeline to estimate the time of death. Horswell also led research that investigated using biosensors to detect chemicals or inorganic poisons in urine and this received international praise because it could help forensic laboratories speedily determine whether or not poison was a cause of death. The preliminary findings were published in 2006, with the Abstract noting: "This study demonstrates that biosensor bioassays could be a useful preliminary screening tool in forensic toxicology." In 2012 Horswell was asked about the feasibility of DNA sequencing of microbial soil DNA to point to locations in forensic work. She said that a study had shown there was a 90% chance of matching microbes in soil on a shoe and those in the shoe print, and although it was more complicated, it was possible to "profile the dirt on a spade and or in the boot of a suspect's car and determine where to dig to find the body that had been buried."

== Awards ==
In 2004 Horswell's presentation Development of bacterial biosensors to detect poisons and drugs in toxicological samples was a certificate winner for the Best Overall Oral Presentation at the Symposium of the Australia and New Zealand Forensic Science Society.
