= Arturo A. Keller =

Civil and environmental engineer

- Born: United States
- Occupations: Civil and environmental engineer and an academic
- Awards: United States Water Prize, U.S. Water Alliance (2015); Agilent Thought Leadership Award (2015); Outstanding Graduate Mentor Award, UCSB (2023)

Academic background
- Education: B.S., Chemical Engineering; B.A., Chemistry; M.S., Civil Engineering; PhD, Civil Engineering
- Alma mater: Cornell University; Stanford University

Arturo A. Keller is an American civil and environmental engineer and an academic. He is a professor at the Bren School of Environmental Science & Management at the University of California, Santa Barbara.

Keller is most known for his work on water quality and resource management, primarily focusing on emerging contaminants as well as creating technologies and management strategies to address water pollution. His work is highly cited, with over 23,300 citations. He is the recipient of the 2015 Agilent Thought Leadership award for his contributions towards the contemporary understanding of the potential environmental implications of nanotechnology, with a specific focus on its impact within agricultural systems.

== Education ==
Keller obtained a B.S. in Chemical Engineering and B.A. in Chemistry from Cornell University in 1980. In 1992, he completed his M.S. in Civil (Environmental) Engineering, followed by a PhD in Civil (Environmental) Engineering in 1996 from Stanford University.

== Career ==
Keller started his academic career in 1996 by joining the University of California, Santa Barbara. There he held multiple appointments including serving as an assistant professor at the Bren School of Environmental Science and Management from 1992 to 1996, and associate professor from 2002 to 2006. Since 2006, he has been a professor. In 2023, he was promoted to the rank of Distinguished professor.

From 1992 to 1996, Keller worked as a Research Associate in the Environmental Division at the Electric Power Research Institute (EPRI). He co-directed the UC Center on the Environmental Implications of Nanotechnology, from 2008 to 2020. He also co-directed the USEPA-funded Chemical Life Cycle Collaborative between 2014 and 2019, where the team developed a framework to predict early life-cycle impacts of new chemicals based on molecular structure, applications, and use characteristics.

== Research ==
Keller has contributed to the management of the Santa Ana River basin and the establishment of a nutrient trading program for the Ohio River Basin, which earned him recognition through a 2015 US Water Prize. His group received a grant from USEPA and developed a framework employing artificial intelligence, specifically machine learning, alongside other predictive techniques for expeditiously conducting risk assessments for both novel and pre-existing chemicals. He also developed the first numerical model, ChemFate, capable of accommodating diverse chemical classes within one unified framework. He has authored numerous publications spanning the fields of water quality and resource management, environmental engineering, the fate and toxicity of nanomaterials as well as their effects on crops.

=== Environmental science and engineering ===
Keller's environmental sciences research has focused on developing methods for quantifying nanomaterial use and release, both at the global and regional levels. His collaborative work with Suzanne McFerran and others provided a global assessment of likely engineered nanomaterials (ENM) emissions into the environment and landfills, revealing their dominant types, applications, and estimated distribution in various environmental compartments. In his estimation of the ENM concentrations at global, regional, national, and local levels, he used a life-cycle approach and material flow analysis, to assess ENM concentrations at different environmental scales, including examples like the San Francisco Bay area, addressing their relevance for industry, regulators, and toxicologists. In his 2014 study, alongside Anastasiya Lazareva, he estimated ENM release from different uses, in particular personal care products, developed an environmental release model for ENMs in major cities, highlighting local factors' influence on release, and found that ENM concentrations across cities would vary significantly, due to local conditions that control the fate of ENMs. In 2023, his team evaluated the potential implications of nanotechnology from 2020 to 2030, and found that there is a projected rapid pace of introduction of novel nanomaterials in applications such as renewable energy generation and storage, but that personal care products continue to represent the most significant release to the environment. Some of his current work is investigating the life cycle of these materials as they are processed in water treatment facilities, and accumulate in bio-solids.

In collaboration with Peng Wang, Keller and his team have developed a novel class of magnetic nanomaterials, Mag-PCMAs, that can be used to treat water with a wide range of contaminants, including many organic pollutants, oxyanions such as perchlorate, and metals. Very recently, he and Qian Gao demonstrated the use of these novel nanoparticles for water disinfection, to remove pathogens while being able to reuse the disinfectant, thereby reducing cost and environmental impacts. Key to the eventual use of nanotechnology for water treatment will be its effectiveness and cost-competitiveness, which was assessed by Keller, Adeyemi Adeleye and other colleagues. With these concepts in mind, he and Victoria Broje developed an advanced oil skimmer for collecting oil from seawater after an oil spill.

=== Fate and toxicity of different classes of nanomaterials ===
Keller has focused on the fate and toxicity of different classes of nanomaterials. His collaborative work with Hongtao Wang and others explored the conditions that increase or decrease the likelihood of exposure to ENMs, particularly in the aquatic environment. Studies of the behavior of well known ENMs, such as Titanium Dioxide (TiO_{2}), Zinc Oxide (ZnO), and Cerium Dioxide (CeO_{2}), within aqueous matrices commonly encountered in realistic environmental settings such as freshwater, groundwater, estuarine and marine waters, demonstrated the major influence of water characteristics such as pH, natural organic matter, and ionic strength (water hardness and salinity). Furthermore, working with Adeyemi Adeleye and others, they demonstrated that microscopic organisms such as phytoplankton and microbes can release extracellular polymeric substances, that play a key role in the determining how ENMs will behave in natural waters. Other studies showed that ENMs are very likely to form aggregates with natural sediments in water, and in fact this can be used as a "cleansing" mechanism to remove ENMs from contaminated water, by adding clay particles to remove them. In 2014, he and his colleague Kendra Garner performed an analysis of publications, to develop the emerging patterns for ENMs in the environment, assessing the potential exposure and toxicity of the most widely used ENMs, and ranking them from high to low risk. These studies led to the development of the nanoFate model, which can be used to assess the predicted environmental concentrations of ENMs in different regions, under a variety of conditions, and considers the dynamics of ENM release as well as local climate and hydrology. Keller has also worked closely with ecotoxicologists, to investigate the health effects of ENMs on different aquatic organisms, such as marine phytoplankton, sea urchins, daphnids, and mussels. These studies have demonstrated that some ENMs pose a health risk to diverse organisms at higher concentrations, typically above predicted environmental concentrations. For example, TiO_{2} nanoparticles are phototoxic to marine phytoplankton, while ZnO nanoparticles notably inhibited their growth. Mussels are filter feeders, and can thus remove large number of particles from water, including ENMs, which can result in transfer of ENMs up the food chain. Eventually, the results of several toxicity studies on a wide range of aquatic species was assessed using Species Sensitivity Distributions for nanomaterials, a tool developed by USEPA to better assess the potential impact of toxicants on an ecosystem.

=== Effects of nanomaterials on crops ===
Keller, in his research, has recently turned his attention to the benefits and potential negative implications of ENMs on agricultural crops. Copper-based nanopesticides promise high effectiveness against fungi and other crop pests, while potentially reducing the amount applied. This may result in less cost for the farmer, and lower environmental implications. Working with Yiming Su and colleagues, they demonstrated that for nanotechnology to live up to its promise, costs have to continue to decrease, while effectiveness requires a careful assessment of the form in which the nanopesticides are formulated. In collaboration with Lijuan Zhao and others, the benefits of nanotechnology to reduce plant stress were assessed. To evaluate the effect of ENMs on crop plants, his research group have been researching the use of metabolomics, to assess how plants respond to the use of different ENMs. His metabolomics analysis with Lijuan Zhao and others highlighted the potential implications and detoxification strategies associated with the agricultural use of nano-Cu and demonstrated that exposure to copper nanoparticles (nano-Cu) in hydroponic culture significantly alters nutrient uptake, triggers metabolic changes, and activates defense mechanisms in cucumber plants. In his investigation of the interaction between Cu(OH)_{2} nano pesticides and lettuce plants, his study provided insights into the molecular-scale plant response to copper nano pesticides in agriculture, and revealed that exposure of lettuce plants to Cu(OH)_{2} nano pesticides predominantly accumulated copper in leaves, disrupted metabolism, caused oxidative stress, and triggered detoxification. Furthermore, a study suggested that Cu-containing nano pesticides, while not harming photosynthesis in cucumber plants, induce molecular responses related to antioxidant and detoxification genes, potentially serving as biomarkers for nano pesticide exposure. In related research, his exploration of the metabolic effects of Cu(OH)_{2} nano pesticide and copper ions on spinach leaves revealed reductions in antioxidants, disruption of metabolic pathways, and a potential decrease in nutritional value.

=== Water quality and resource management ===
At the larger scale, Keller has developed the science for large-scale water quality trading programs. For trading to be effective, knowledge of the factors that go into evaluating a trade was developed by Keller and his team. This work led to the 2015 United States Water Prize from the U.S. Water Alliance to the team led by Jessica Fox at the Electric Power Research Institute. Keller and Hongtao Wang, along with other collaborators, have also made contributions to the assessment of the Energy-Water Nexus, that is the linkage between these two key resources. His research highlighted many important aspects, including the fact that significant energy is needed for potable water treatment, as well as for wastewater processing. His research further emphasized that the water footprint of the iron and steel industry is also significant, with important implications for China and other major economies. Additionally, his research also stressed that water is also an important aspect in power generation, which is changing as the use of renewable energies continues to rise.

== Awards and honors ==
- 2015 – Agilent Thought Leadership Award, Agilent Technologies
- 2015 – United States Water Prize, U.S. Water Alliance

== Selected articles ==
- Keller, Arturo A.; Wang, Hongtao; Zhou, Dongxu; Lenihan, Hunter S.; Cherr, Gary; Cardinale, Bradley J.; Miller, Robert; Ji, Zhaoxia (March 15, 2010). "Stability and Aggregation of Metal Oxide Nanoparticles in Natural Aqueous Matrices". Environmental Science & Technology. 44 (6): 1962–1967. Bibcode:2010EnST...44.1962K. doi:10.1021/es902987d. PMID 20151631.
- Keller, Arturo A.; McFerran, Suzanne; Lazareva, Anastasiya; Suh, Sangwon (June 2013). "Global life cycle releases of engineered nanomaterials". Journal of Nanoparticle Research. 15 (6) 1692. Bibcode:2013JNR....15.1692K. doi:10.1007/s11051-013-1692-4.
- Keller, Arturo A.; Lazareva, Anastasiya (January 14, 2014). "Predicted Releases of Engineered Nanomaterials: From Global to Regional to Local". Environmental Science & Technology Letters. 1 (1): 65–70. Bibcode:2014EnSTL...1...65K. doi:10.1021/ez400106t.
- Adeleye, Adeyemi S.; Conway, Jon R.; Garner, Kendra; Huang, Yuxiong; Su, Yiming; Keller, Arturo A. (February 2016). "Engineered nanomaterials for water treatment and remediation: Costs, benefits, and applicability". Chemical Engineering Journal. 286: 640–662. Bibcode:2016ChEnJ.286..640A. doi:10.1016/j.cej.2015.10.105.
- Miller, Robert J.; Lenihan, Hunter S.; Muller, Erik B.; Tseng, Nancy; Hanna, Shannon K.; Keller, Arturo A. (October 2010). "Impacts of Metal Oxide Nanoparticles on Marine Phytoplankton". Environmental Science & Technology. 44 (19): 7329–7334. Bibcode:2010EnST...44.7329M. doi:10.1021/es100247x. PMID 20469893.
