= Dillo (woreda) =

District in Ethiopia

- District
- Interactive map of Dillo
- Location within Ethiopia
- Coordinates: 4°15′N 37°42′E
- Country: Ethiopia
- Region: Oromia
- Zone: Borena Zone

Dillo is a district of Borena Zone in the Oromia Region of Ethiopia.

As of 2013, the population was estimated at 43,853 (21,543 female and 22,310 male) with 97% rural and 3% urban. The dominant climate condition is arid and the population relies on hand-dug shallow wells and ponds for water sources. The residents engage in livestock production, predominantly cattle, sheep and goats, but also equines, camel and poultry.
