= List of rivers of Chile (D–O) =

The information regarding the (Chilean) river names from D-O on this page has been compiled from the data supplied by GeoNames. It includes all features named "Rio", "Canal", "Arroyo", "Estero" and those whose Feature Code is associated with a stream of water. (Note: The arbitrarily selected codes are RPDS, CHN, CNLA, CNLB, CNLD, CNLI, CNLN, CNLSB, CRKT, DTCH, DTCHI, DTCHD, ESTY, FORD, SBED, STM, STMA, STMB, STMC, STMD, STMH, STMI, STMIX, STMM, STMQ, STMS, STMSB, STMX, TNLC, WTRC, WTRH)

== Content ==
This list contains:

- Name of the stream, in Spanish language
- Latitude and a link to a GeoNames map of the river
- Height of the mouth
- Other names for the same feature, if any

== List ==
Ordered list of rivers of Chile D-O
Name	Lat & map	Mouth height (m)	Other names
Dahue	-40.26209	73	
Daly	-53.54876	144	(Dale, Estero Daly)
Damas	-40.56667	22	
Dangle	-45.49022	52	(Dang)
Dañicalqui	-37.02723	125	
Danquilco	-36.90457	235	
Ded	-41.88639	7	(Ded)
Deille	-38.58509	47	
Delta	-46.76634	206	(Delta, Rio las Deltas, Delta, Río de las Deltas)
Denquer	-32.31667	76	
Desaguadero	-41.91667	94	
Desagüe	-45.7764	226	
Desagüe	-37.38551	70	
Desagüe	-37.26356	98	
Descabezado	-37.50096	149	
Descabezado	-35.45448	1580	
Deslinde	-36.25743	1323	
Desplayado	-45.77327	171	
Desplayes	-48.05454	394	(Desplayer, Rio Desplayes, Desplayer, Río Desplayes)
Detif	-42.65528	-9999	
Deuco	-37.84474	82	
Diablito	-38.04433	612	(Diablito, Rio El Diablito, Diablito, Río El Diablito)
Diablo	-48.98495	534	(Diablo, Diablo)
Diablo	-38.03175	570	(Diablo, Rio El Diablo, Diablo, Río El Diablo)
Diablo	-33.9867	1775	
Diablo	-47.2642	159	
Diablo	-43.56973	123	
Dichas	-38.99088	57	(Dichas, Estero Ineihoc)
Dientes	-44.15027	391	
Diguillín	-36.8664	69	
Dillo	-38.43752	474	
Dimilhue	-37.5465	374	
Dinamarca	-44.02924	42	
Discordia	-53.37594	9	
Diuto	-37.41734	142	(Diuto, Estero Duilo, Estero Duito, Diuto, Diuto)
Doce de Febrero	-53.06178	194	
Dollerepu	-39.08475	879	(Dellerrepu, Estero Dollerepu)
Dollinco	-38.61648	173	(Dollinco, Dollinco, Dollinco)
Dollinco	-40.39657	14	
Dollinco	-40.04296	201	
Dollinco	-39.54934	55	
Dollinco	-38.96972	40	
Dolores	-33.16474	2907	
Doña Toribia	-35.81379	211	(Dona Toribia, Estero Doña Toribia, Estero Pena Toribia, Estero Peña Toribia)
Dong	-34.5851	12	
Dongo	-42.5883	30	
Donguil	-39.02764	50	
Donoso	-53.81667	171	(Donosa, Rio Donoso, Donosa, Río Donoso)
Dorotea	-46.59151	9	
Douglas	-55.19127	16	
Duao	-34.92733	39	
Dulce	-26.90094	4335	(Dulce, Dulce)
Dumo	-38.19586	268	
Duqueco	-37.56685	77	
Durazno	-33.52563	1184	
Durazno	-31.91507	701	
Echeverría	-37.46132	912	
Egaña	-53.4022	150	
El Águila	-38.36315	1061	
el Ajial	-32.28225	133	
El Arco	-41.40874	411	
El Arrayán	-33.36236	861	(Cajon Arrayan, Cajón de Arrayan, Los Arrayanes, Estero de El Arrayan, Estero de El Arrayán, Estero Arrayan, Estero del Arrayán)
El Auque	-47.24177	159	
El Azul	-43.48876	55	(Azul, Rio El Azul, Azul, Río El Azul)
El Bagual	-48.34722	361	
Elba	-47.26715	160	
El Bajo	-33.71667	143	
El Bayo	-45.8209	271	
El Blanco	-43.59354	126	
El Blanquillo	-32.56192	105	(Blanquillos, Estero El Blanquillo)
El Bolsón	-37.4729	117	
El Boqui	-37.54217	699	
El Bosque	-47.38904	299	
El Buche	-34.96713	60	
El Buitre	-34.944	116	
El Buitre	-34.79203	277	(Buitre, Estero El Buitre)
El Cajón	-33.78333	201	
El Cajón	-34.19933	293	
El Calvario	-34.58181	73	(El Calvario, Calbario)
El Canelo	-53.16278	2	(Canelo, El Canelas, Rio El Canelo, El Canelas, Río El Canelo)
El Caracol	-38.48003	933	
El Carmen	-33.41559	621	
El Carretón	-32.70093	238	(El Carretero, Estero El Carreton, Estero El Carretón, Estero Carreton, Estero del Carretón)
El Carrizo	-33.32182	889	
El Chorrillo	-34.07944	221	
El Cobre	-32.7411	722	(El Cobre, Estero Cobre, El Cobre)
El Cobre	-32.67275	251	(El Cobre, Estero Cobre)
El Cóguil	-34.20637	185	
El Coironal	-33.64317	1926	
El Colorado	-33.56667	828	
El Corral	-47.62639	108	
El Culenar	-35.32041	83	
El Dao	-41.76389	20	
El Durazno	-35.11667	75	
El Durazno	-34.41667	187	
El Encanto	-40.79032	150	(Buyinco, Estero El Encanto)
El Encuentro	-47.70296	25	
El Espigado	-37.37943	161	
El Espinal	-32.45	260	(El Espinal, Estero Espinal)
El Extravío	-33.93458	1687	(El Extravio, El Extravio, Estero El Extravío, Estero Extravio, Estero del Extravío)
El Gallo	-32.65638	360	
El Ganso	-34.24083	197	(El Ganso, Estero Ganso)
El Gato	-41.46144	16	(El Gato, Rio Gato, El Gato, Río Gato)
El Gato	-33.71727	312	
El Guanaco	-53.33475	35	
El Guapi	-34.94792	12	
Elgueta	-37.42625	380	
El Guindo	-35.30371	169	
El Indio	-37.29929	574	
Ellallicura	-38.4349	302	
El Lingue	-39.44597	3	(El Lingue, Rio Lingua, Rio Lingue, Rio Mehuin, El Lingue, Río Lingua, Río Mehuin)
El Lobo	-36.91505	259	
El Malito	-45.28141	260	
El Mancay	-43.58241	130	
El Manco	-37.33056	379	
El Mañío	-41.40004	63	(El Manio, Estero El Mañío, Estero Manio, Estero Mañío)
El Manzano Estero	-33.35	829	
El Manzano	-40.68906	200	(El Manzano, Malalcura, Malalcura)
El Manzano	-38.86313	416	(El Manzano, Estero El Manzanol, Manzano, del Manzano)
El Manzano	-35.31482	226	
El Manzano	-34.16895	110	
El Marco	-33.66667	223	
El Melón	-32.83824	305	(El Melon, Canal El Melón, Canal el Melon, Canal el Melón, Melon)
El Membrillo	-34.03533	441	(El Membrillo, Estero Membrillo)
El Membrillo	-33.34521	8	(El Membrillo, Estero Membrillo, del Membrillo, del Membrillo)
El Molino	-37.35128	26	(El Molino, El Molino, El Molino)
El Molino	-47.1441	158	
El Molino	-41.20363	77	
El Molino	-37.2428	111	
El Molino	-35.99605	856	(Molino, El Molino)
El Monte	-32.75	846	
El Moro	-43.64936	156	
EL Moro	-43.76171	396	
El Morro	-36.72953	6	
El Mulo	-37.89638	169	
El Negro	-43.95994	39	
El Nueve	-42.03622	25	
El Pangal	-37.70201	623	
El Pangue	-35.35366	110	
El Pangue	-32.46222	53	(El Pangue, Estero Pangue)
El Parrón	-35.84492	10	(Parron, Arroyo Parrón, El Parron, Estero El Parrón, Parron, Parrón)
El Parrón	-34.93728	123	(El Parron, Estero El Parrón, Estero Parron, Estero Parrón)
El Pejerrey	-36.04925	363	(El Pejerrey, Estero Pejerrey)
El Pejerrey	-36.01667	429	
El Peñón	-34.98458	4	
El Peral	-38.64549	11	
El Pescado	-41.02938	107	(El Pescado, Estero Pescado)
El Piral	-34.83333	300	
El Quemado	-36.90834	205	(El Quemado, Estero Molino Quemado)
Elqui	-29.89311	3	(Elaui, Rio Elqui, Elaui, Río Elqui)
El Quillay	-34.5394	8	
El Risco	-33.38356	1407	
El Roble	-41.43423	78	
El Rodado	-37.5327	742	
El Rosario	-33.66667	267	
El Rosario	-41.41186	32	
El Salero	-32.8	847	
El Saltillo	-38.66409	1192	
El Salto	-41.22388	61	(El Salto, Estero Salto)
El Salto	-40.82131	300	
El Salto	-38.85	493	
El Salto	-36.73046	1014	
El Salto	-42.0086	140	
El Salto	-43.71616	345	(El Tigre, El Tigre)
el Sauce	-33.8108	79	
El Sauce	-33.61866	7	
El Sauce	-32.6575	362	
El Tambor	-38.60159	278	
El Tollo	-33.68333	1151	
El Toqui	-44.99661	306	
El Tordillo	-32.59125	3028	
El Toro	-37.38333	1142	
El Toro	-37.33056	672	
El Toro	-37.05449	1227	
El Toro	-36.32542	1209	
El Toro	-35.94561	784	
El Toro	-42.02149	197	
El Trapén	-41.43333	99	
El Único	-38.98173	95	
El Vado	-41.62912	29	
El Valiente	-37.54235	706	
El Varal	-41.97836	38	(El Varal)
El Violén	-38.50459	336	
El Zanjón	-41.05	71	
Empedrado	-35.57805	86	
Empedrado	-35.63658	30	
Emperador Guillermo	-45.2645	173	
Encanto	-40.77967	92	(Encanta, Estero del Encanto)
Enco	-39.91843	112	
Engaño	-48.43831	290	
Engaño	-48.33333	574	
Engaño	-46.44235	233	
Engaño	-43.72589	567	
Enredaderas	-43.47338	50	(Enredadera, Arroyo Enredaderas, Enredadera, Estero Enredaderas)
Entuco	-38.77763	92	
Enulhueco	-37.91611	105	(Emulhueco, Estero Enulhueco)
Epucheguin	-38.25524	836	(Epucheguin, Bellavista)
Epucó	-39.51589	5	
Epucura	-39.49901	280	
Epun	-37.85	1817	
Epuralal	-38.96037	282	
Eric	-43.99453	34	
Errázuriz	-34.4	334	
Escala	-42.49444	622	
Escondido	-42.30454	49	
Escondido	-46.51942	809	
Esmeralda	-53.54423	145	
Esmeralda	-33.24436	2443	
Espejo	-33.64671	604	
Esperanza	-53.44357	7	
Esperanza	-44.6255	238	
Esperanza	-41.31203	100	
Esperanza	-41.11151	11	(Esperanza, Esperanza, Esperanza)
Esperanza	-38.16667	214	
Espinal	-36.76193	70	(Espinal, Estero Espiral)
Espolón	-43.11309	411	
Espolón	-43.20518	331	
Esquilluco	-38.37929	51	
Este	-41.49408	10	
Este	-41.38816	0	
Este	-41.42138	246	
Evans	-53.78197	176	(Evans, Evans, Evans)
Exploradores	-46.31386	2	
Farías	-36.23373	1124	(Faria, Arroyo Faría, Arroyo Farias, Farias, Estero Farías)
Faro	-36.67604	1356	
Feo	-45.18478	401	
Fiero	-46.71892	315	
Fiero	-38.54393	668	(Fiero, Estero Fierro)
Figueroa	-44.05725	81	
Figueroa	-27.72215	2574	
Filcun	-39.01459	1094	(Eilcun, Estero Filcun)
Finfín	-38.82745	47	
Flores	-33.07149	2682	
Flores	-34.22576	1598	(Flores, Flores)
Folilco	-40.51437	24	
Folilco	-38.86667	430	
Fontaine	-54.4828	3	
Forrahue	-40.77074	45	
Forrahue	-40.52971	12	(Ferrahue, Estero Forrahue)
Forrahue	-40.38506	25	(Farrahue, Estero Forrahue)
Fortuna	-37.61943	134	
Fox	-53.87676	0	
Fray Carlos	-34.83408	2336	(Fray Carlos, Fray Carlos)
Frío	-43.17343	44	
Frío	-41.69767	43	
Frío	-41.27491	66	(Las Minas, Frio, Frío)
Frío	-41.21667	38	
Frío	-24.89617	3382	
Frío	-33.58333	390	
Frío	-33.44253	1878	
Frío	-43.63508	104	
Frío	-41.44439	246	
Frutilla	-43.94686	10	
Frutillar	-47.24502	157	
Fudoso	-47.04743	345	
Fullero	-33.16041	216	
Futa Coihueco	-40.64611	23	
Futa	-39.87534	0	(Fula, Rio Futa, Fula, Río Futa)
Futa	-40.89757	81	
Futaleufú	-43.305	338	(Fetaleufu, Rio Futalelfu, Rio Futaleufu, Fetaleufú, Río Futalelfú, Río Futaleufú)
Fuy	-39.82167	194	(Fui, Rio Fuy, Fui, Río Fuy)
Gabriel Quiroz	-48.33554	181	
Gajardo	-40.68657	72	
Gallardo	-33.03935	2496	
Gallipavo	-36.70715	51	
Galpones	-41.66667	8	
Gamboa	-42.48149	6	
Ganchos	-53.85814	131	
Gangas	-36.25392	1201	(Gangas, Gangas, de Gangas)
Ganso	-40.9594	130	
Gaona	-36.36672	144	
Gato	-36.72838	746	
Gaviotas	-40.87347	121	
Geikie	-51.3151	55	
Gennes	-53.83107	36	(Gennes, Rio Gennes, De Gennes, Río Gennes)
George	-48.49118	3	
Gil de Lemos	-43.31694	9	
Gloria	-36.08342	976	
Golgol	-40.67632	187	
Golondrina Río	-52.19964	10	
Gomero	-37.19381	45	
Gómez	-41.50833	6	
Gómez	-32.66374	503	(Cajon Gomez, Cajón de Gómez, de Gomez, Estero de Gómez)
González	-31.98469	1585	
Gonzalo	-42.56018	3	
Gordito	-31.06534	2541	
Grande	-53.97507	4	
Grande	-53.08961	1	
Grande	-53.00424	3	
Grande	-46.76408	825	
Grande	-44.66569	173	
Grande	-42.05093	4	
Grande	-39.3024	228	
Grande	-38.28632	16	(Honda, Grande, Grande)
Grande	-38.09712	796	
Grande	-37.18333	58	
Grande	-30.59114	223	
Grande	-19.4529	3760	
Grande	-47.06811	210	
Grande	-34.3	272	
Green	-53.66667	4	
Grey	-51.18451	32	
Guadaba	-38.01911	71	
Guada	-41.57231	42	(Guada)
Guaiguasi	-18.70492	4192	
Guaiguasi	-19.06712	3938	(Guaiguasi, Guaiguasi, Guaiguasi)
Guailas	-18.05108	3704	(Guailas, Guaylas)
Guaiquillo	-34.99935	206	
Guaiquivilo	-36.10207	994	(Guaiquillo, Rio Guaiquivilo, Rio Melado Guaiquivilo, Guaiquivilo, Río Melado Guaiquivilo)
Guairabo	-53.3223	4	(Chorrillo Guairabo, Guairabo)
Guairavo	-36.25707	130	(Guairavo, Estero Guarinapo)
Guaitani	-19.5	3850	(Guaitani, Arroyo Huaitani, Guaitani)
Gualas	-46.51777	13	
Gualcutemu	-38.25	145	
Guallaco	-37.51667	126	
Guallalí	-38.05558	879	
Guallamo	-39.61098	13	(Guallamo, Estero Huallame, Estero Huellame)
Gualleco	-35.22064	51	(Gualleco, Estero Las Tizas)
Guallerupe	-38.85921	480	(Alpehue, Rio Guallerupe, Alpehue, Río Guallerupe)
Gualyepulli	-38.56198	955	(Gualyepulli, Rio Guaye, Rio Huelvepulli, Gualyepulli, Río Guaye, Río Huelvepulli)
Guamaqui	-38.46188	43	
Guamblad	-43.28504	17	(Guambiad, Estero Guamblad, Huamblad)
Guanacos	-53.04013	198	(Chorrillo Guanacos, Guanacos)
Guanehue	-39.62266	135	(Guanehue, Rio Huanehue, Guanehue, Río Huanehue)
Guanta	-29.84708	1226	(Guanta, Estero Huanta, Estero Malposo Guanta, Estero de Guanta)
Guape	-39.93001	223	
Guapi	-38.44063	118	
Guaquén	-32.34906	7	(Guaquen, Estero Guaquén, Estero Huaquen)
Guarne	-41.51667	11	
Guatulame	-30.7192	383	(Guatalame, Rio Guatulame, Guatulame)
Guayacán	-33.60692	912	
Guayacán	-32.51907	370	(Guayacan, Estero Guayacán, Esterro Guayacan, Esterro de Guayacán)
Guayusca	-40.93934	63	(Guayusca, Guayusca, Rio Huayusca, Guayusca, Río Huayusca)
Guenón	-35.31403	22	
Guillermo	-51.21667	67	(Guillermo, Don Guillermo, Don Guillermo)
Guiña	-38.31667	303	
Guindos	-39.29857	4	
Guindos	-37.06326	158	
Guisno	-39.11214	100	
Guisoca	-46.81986	779	
Guyunden	-41.82644	5	
Haase	-52.55136	2	(Haase, Rio Hass, Rio Husse, Rio las Minas, Haase, Río Husse, Río de las Minas)
Haverbeck	-39.83385	4	
Helado	-34.82535	1063	(Helado, Helado)
Hidalgo	-32.50713	1518	
Hielo	-51.09585	92	
Hilotregua	-37.8799	877	
Hirrevilo	-39.92984	175	
Hojalar	-22.26909	3163	(Hojal, Rio Hojalar, Hojal, Río Hojalar)
Hollenberg	-51.90704	2	(Hollemberg, Rio Hollenberg, Rio Hollomberg, Hollemberg, Río Hollenberg, Río Hollomberg)
Hónar	-23.18333	2333	(Honar, Quebrada de Hónar, de Honar, de Hónar)
Hondo	-53.52529	105	
Hondo	-36.29546	1589	
Hondo	-42.54028	51	
Horn	-36.76839	945	
Horquetas	-53.14046	255	(Chorrillo Horquetas, Horquetas)
Horquetas	-46.37974	377	
Hospitales	-35.17251	1311	
Hoyada Seca	-36.08656	980	
Hua Hum	-40.11667	652	(Guahun, Rio Guahun Norte, Rio Hua Hum, Rio Huaun, Guahún, Río Guahún Norte, Río Hua Hum, Río Huaun)
Huallilemu	-33.41667	-9999	(Guallelemu, Estero Huallilemu, Estero Guallilemo)
Huanteleufu	-40.81716	83	
Huaqui	-37.37131	56	(Guaque, Rio Guaqui, Rio Huaqui, Guaque, Río Guaqui, Río Huaqui)
Huáscar	-53.75488	138	(Chorrillo Huascar, Chorrillo Huáscar, Huascar, Estero Huáscar)
Huasco	-28.44751	6	(Guasco, Rio Huasco, Huasco)
Huayusca	-41.16866	9	(Guayusca, Rio Huayusca, Rio Hueyusca, Guayusca, Río Huayusca, Río Hueyusca)
Huechulepán	-38.89399	975	
Huecó	-37.16797	41	
Huedque	-36.05448	152	
Hueico	-38.13333	63	
Hueicolla	-40.14581	28	(Hueicolla, Hueicolla)
Hueihué	-41.89683	4	
Hueinahue	-40.31291	91	
Huelmo	-41.66664	9	
Huelón	-35.07405	13	
Huelqueco	-38.63123	172	(Huelqueco, Huelquenco)
Huempelen	-41.1218	39	
Huemula	-46.30936	214	(Huemula, Huemul, Estero Huemula)
Huemules	-47.62716	6	
Huemules	-36.76711	1265	
Huemules	-45.81684	453	(Simpson o Aisen sur o Galera)
Huenchullami	-35.11991	7	(Huenchullami, Huenchullami, Huenchullami)
Huenencura	-38	1188	(Huencura, Rio Huenencura, Huencura, Río Huenencura)
Huenocoihue	-43.03013	8	
Huenteleufú	-40.21944	309	
Huentraico	-38.04468	128	
Huenue	-42.59643	6	
Hueñu-Hueñu	-41.25962	48	(Hueno Hueno, Rio Huenu-Huenu, Hueño Hueño, Río Hueñu-Hueñu)
Huépil	-37.16573	237	
Huepollén	-39.02344	1020	(Huepollen, Estero Huepollén, Estero Huepoltue)
Huequeco	-40.32519	119	
Huequén	-37.78694	69	(Hueque, Rio Huequen, Hueque, Río Huequén)
Huequi	-42.25255	43	(Hueguetumao, Huehuetumao, Hueguetamao, Rio Hueque, Rio Huequi, Huequi)
Hueyelhue	-40.69732	18	(Hueyelhue, Hueyelhue, Hueyelhue)
Huicha	-41.84886	4	(Huicha, Huicha)
Huichahue	-38.86375	91	
Huichahue	-38.84618	53	(Huichahue, El Tonco)
Huiculunche	-22.3	2619	(Huiculunche, Huicouluncha, Quebrada Huiculuncha, Quebrada Huiculunche)
Huidobro	-32.77921	446	(Guidobro, Canal Huidobro)
Huilchico	-38.76667	113	
Huilehuile	-39.82753	173	(Huilehuil, Rio Huilehuile, Rio Huilehuilo, Huilehuil, Río Huilehuile, Río Huilehuilo)
Huilio	-38.96238	47	
Huillinco	-41.92988	16	
Huillinco	-38.11994	7	(Huillinco, Rio Lluillinco, Huillinco, Río Lluillinco)
Huillinco	-37.4273	33	(Huillinco, Huillinco, Huillinco)
Huillinco	-40.87041	111	
Huillinco	-40.83488	127	
Huillinco	-40.78961	66	
Huillinco	-40.45002	146	
Huillinco	-38.81667	66	
Huillinco	-38.33075	52	(Huillinco, Huillinco, Huillinco)
Huillín	-34.04621	137	
Huillín	-40.81292	87	
Huillín	-40.76926	144	
Huillín	-40.67464	109	
Huillín	-41.05972	53	
Huillinlebu	-38.30439	312	
Huilma	-40.71864	29	(Huelma, Estero Huilma)
Huilmo	-38.08439	6	(Huilmo, Estero Machihue)
Huilquilco	-38.84076	78	
Huimpil	-38.50168	78	
Huiña	-46.31564	294	
Huiñahuiña	-39.86972	33	(Huinahuina, Estero Huinahuino, Estero Huiñahuiña, Estero Huiñahuiño)
Huinal	-42.36417	106	
Huinchuta	-19.19861	4065	(Huinchula, Arroyo Huinchuta, Huinchala)
Huiñe	-34.84849	6	
Huinganes	-36.22866	559	
Huinganes	-35.86176	118	
Huinica	-34.45555	257	
Huiño-Huiño	-40.50436	90	
Huique	-34.46679	164	
Huira	-38.04868	619	
Huiscapi	-39.28305	181	(Huiscape, Rio Huiscapi, Huiscape, Río Huiscapi)
Huitanco	-37.33087	109	
Huiti	-39.96918	128	
Hullinco	-38.98333	31	
Hullinlebu	-35.05693	33	
Humenco	-37.38422	241	
Humo	-45.97597	634	(Humo)
Hunaco	-38.68074	290	
Hunaco	-38.65606	356	(Humaco, Estero Hunaco)
Hurcaco	-38.76449	14	(Huircaco, Estero Hurcaco)
Hurtadino	-32.83333	893	
Hurtado	-30.59389	236	(Hurtado)
Husco	-40.3321	118	
Ibacache	-33.48333	201	
Ibáñez	-46.28605	206	
Ibáñez	-46.10299	341	
Iculpe	-40.3185	74	
Idahue	-34.3554	218	
Idaico	-38.22569	185	
Ignao	-40.26365	64	(Ignao, Rio Igoao, Ignao, Río Igoao)
Ilecura	-39.35086	377	
Illapel	-31.67264	160	
Illinco	-38.40874	24	
Iloca	-34.94812	12	
Imperial	-38.78658	4	(Imperial, Imperial)
Iñaque	-39.68354	10	
Incaguasi	-22.36087	2828	(Incaguasi, Rio Incahuasi, Rio Incaquas, Incaguasi, Río Incahuasi)
Indio	-38.46221	706	
Indio	-53.03333	62	
Indio	-37.79622	210	
Ineique	-38.95	74	
Infiernillo	-35.04816	1102	
Infiernillo	-37.13104	647	
Ingaguas	-29.98934	1640	
Ingenio	-30.63111	128	(Ingenio, Ingenio)
Inio	-43.36091	4	
Intermitente	-38.65246	1052	
Isluga	-19.2788	3727	
Itata	-36.38746	0	
Itatita	-37.15	252	
Itraque	-37.73485	66	
Jahuel	-32.71852	774	
Janure	-18.84929	3879	(Janure, Janure)
Japón	-53.84777	154	
Jardín	-41.12232	39	
Jaruma	-18.88722	3696	(Jarama, Rio Jaruma, Jarama, Río Jaruma)
Jauna	-22.62225	3467	(Jana, Arroyo de Jauna)
Jeinemeni	-46.53333	211	(Jeinemeni, Jeinemeni)
Jopla	-43.20216	7	
Jordán	-38.1072	610	
Jornune	-19.84748	3999	
Jorobado	-44.42109	655	
Jorquera	-28.04543	1220	
Julepe	-43.40622	93	
Juliet	-41.21667	53	
Juncal	-32.91688	2445	
Juncalillo	-32.86542	2178	
Juncalito	-26.48417	3584	
Junquillar	-35.19162	7	
Junquillo	-38.10583	7	
Junquillos	-37.63502	106	
Jurase	-18.20652	3786	
Kuschel	-41.18981	112	(Kuschel, Estero Kuschet)
La Aguada	-40.64634	190	(Aguada, Estero La Aguada)
La Apancora	-41.26181	231	
La Araña	-34.43495	136	
La Arena	-41.06375	104	
La Arena	-30.73752	1424	
La Ballena	-41.13706	143	(Ballena, Estero La Ballena)
la Ballena	-32.26667	26	
La Calchona	-33.70677	1032	
La Calera	-33.66667	391	
La Caleta	-53.20342	5	(La Caleta, Rio la Caleta, La Caleta, Río la Caleta)
La Cañada	-47.44952	316	
la Cañada	-32.72851	2319	
La Candelaria	-34.76334	199	(La Candelaria, de La Candelaria, Estero Candelaria)
La Canela	-32.62692	10	(La Canela, La Canela)
La Canela	-31.66667	702	
la Canoa	-32.35	113	
La Capilla	-35.31983	188	
La Cascada	-41.11667	90	(La Cascada, Estero la Cascada)
La Cascada	-40.82005	129	(La Cascada, Estero la Cascada)
La Castellana	-37.53869	627	
Lacaya	-42.44787	54	
la Chicharra	-32.00054	1459	(Chicharra, La Chicharra, Rio Chicharra, de La Chicharra, Río de la Chicharra)
La Chupalla	-37.44733	125	(Chupalla, Estero La Chupalla)
la Cigüeña	-33.52066	9	
La Cimbra	-41.27	418	(La Cimbra, Rio la Cimbra, La Cimbra, Río la Cimbra)
La Cofiana	-41.15998	124	
La Colonia	-47.31066	83	(Activo, Rio la Colonia, Colonia)
la Compañía	-41.1566	140	
La Condenada	-34.43442	134	
La Crianza	-33.63333	127	
la Cuesta	-32.86826	738	
la Cueva Blanca	-23.00257	4462	
La Culebra	-41.47437	32	
La División	-41.78333	152	
La Esperanza	-41.24415	353	(La Esperanza, Rio la Esperanza, La Esperanza, Río Esperanza)
La Esperanza	-37.59017	134	
La Esperanza	-33.58333	488	
la Expedición	-40.99603	111	
La Fortaleza	-34.72036	116	(Fortaleza, Estero La Fortaleza)
la Gallina	-27.87467	3521	(La Gallina, Rio la Gallina, La Gallina, Río Gallina)
La Gateada	-47.68515	136	
La Gloria	-30.23699	3148	
La Gloria	-32.75458	2003	(La Gloria, Estero Gloria)
La Gloria	-32.84561	287	(La Gloria, Estero la Gloria)
La Gloria	-45.0934	356	
La Guacha	-41.02999	108	(La Guacha, Estero La Huacha)
La Guacha	-41.13026	134	
Laguna Chica	-28.86969	2226	
Laguna Grande	-28.88506	1863	
Laguna	-30.1	3001	
Laguna	-35.08333	216	
Laguna	-34.21822	559	(Laguna, Cauquenes, Estero Laguna)
Lagunilla	-30.11838	4	(Lagunilla, Estero Lagunillas, Lagunilla, Quebrada Lagunillas)
La Hora	-35.85106	1888	
La Horqueta	-46.60902	368	
La Huella	-41.01894	171	
Lahuenco	-39.29439	559	
la Invernada	-35.71022	1297	
Laja	-37.26875	44	(Laja, Rio La Laja, Laja, Río de La Laja)
Laja	-38.8056	40	
Laja	-37.45146	271	
La Jarilla	-33.43581	1897	(La Jarilla, Estero Jarilla)
Lajitas	-27.26551	4079	
Lajitas	-37.17056	269	
La Junta	-40.05	137	
La Junta	-41.41045	321	(La Junta, La Junta, La Junta)
La Junta	-41.02305	98	
La Laguna	-29.97596	2082	(La Laguna, Rio Laguna, Rio la Laguna, La Laguna, Río Laguna, Río Laguna)
La Laguna	-27.6121	3590	(La Laguna, Estero la Laguna)
la Laguna	-41.04645	44	
La Langosta	-37.0928	1465	
La Laviera	-32.67226	251	
La Leonera	-33.16228	803	(Cajon la Leonera, La Leonera, Estero Leonera, La Leonera)
La Leonera	-33.31067	1978	(La Leonera, Estero Leonera)
La Ligua	-32.40866	11	(La Ligua, Rio la Ligua, La Ligua, Río Ligua)
la Loma Baja	-44.54297	658	(La Loma Baja, Rio la Loma Baja, La Loma Baja, Río Loma Baja)
La Luz	-33.606	764	
La Manga	-41.77775	3	(La Manga, La Manga)
la Mano	-53.17074	38	(La Mano, Rio la Mano, La Mano, Río Mano)
La Máquina	-41.72564	58	(Maquina, Rio La Maquina, Máquina, Río de La Máquina)
La Máquina	-41.62072	1	(La Maquina, Rio Maquina, de La Máquina, Río de la Máquina)
La Máquina	-37.96962	704	
La Máquina	-37.81334	179	
La Margarita	-33.06667	649	(La Margarita, Estero Margarita)
La Marquesa	-33.6194	189	(Marquesa, Estero La Marquesa)
Lamas	-27.06248	3920	(Lama, Rio Lamas, Lama, Río Lamas)
La Matanza	-35.79634	169	(La Matanza, Estero Manzana)
Lamedi	-41.36667	37	
Lameguapi	-40.20184	13	
La Merced	-36.45048	105	
La Mina	-38.06667	80	
La Mina	-43.30304	27	
La Mina Rica	-53.00882	4	(Chorrillo Mina Rica, La Mina Rica, Estero Mina Rica, Mina Rica, Mina Rica)
La Monja	-33.87771	117	
Lampa	-33.38502	473	(Lampa, de Lampa, de Lampa)
Lampato	-36.70056	58	
Lancú	-38.25281	919	
Lañinagual	-40.26816	12	
Lanlan	-38.67246	644	
La Obra	-35.30603	225	
La Ola	-26.43786	3526	(La Ola, Quebrada Ola, La Ola, Rio Ola, Rio de La Ola, Rio de la Ola, La Ola, Río Ola, Río de La Ola, Río de la Ola)
La Ovejería	-40.57493	20	
La Palizada	-40.91944	116	
la Paloma	-41.37416	26	
La Paloma	-45.84004	241	(Paloma, Paloma)
La Paloma	-33.61364	2704	(La Paloma, Estero la Paloma)
La Patagua	-32.49162	389	(La Patagua, Estero la Patagua)
La Patagua	-32.46729	84	(La Patagua, Estero Patagua)
La Patagüilla	-33.51667	172	
Lapataia	-54.77181	5	
La Paz	-53.04542	140	
La Pellana	-34.99553	37	
La Peña	-41.41148	247	
La Peñuela	-34.85053	149	
La Piedra	-41.05749	100	
La Pirámide	-46.60934	368	
la Plata	-42.31574	13	
la Plata	-41.00303	46	
La Plata	-41.15	242	
La Platina	-34.791	267	
La Playa	-33.3	261	(La Playa, La Playa, La Playa)
la Plaza	-40.38567	283	
La Población	-34.65372	49	
La Población	-41.10957	120	
la Polvareda	-32.93148	1561	(Las Polvaredas, Estero Polvareda)
La Potreada	-37.23208	73	
la Poza Honda	-34.0759	112	
La Poza	-41.28333	56	
La Poza	-41.01667	197	
La Poza	-40.50762	90	
La Poza	-41.84815	3	
La Providencia	-33.15	666	
La Puente	-36.08306	977	
La Puente	-35.31558	163	(La Puente, Estero La Puerta)
La Puente	-35.28526	240	
la Puerta	-53.05735	6	(La Puerta, Arroyo la Puerta)
Lara	-36.62374	539	
Laraquete	-37.16728	8	
La Raya	-36.14303	178	
La Retamilla	-32.56168	105	
Largo	-46.37133	214	
Largo	-41.35132	38	
Lar	-42.14324	14	
La Rinconada	-33.51667	451	
La Rosa	-34.37159	146	(La Rosa, Estero La Rosas)
Larqui	-36.689	36	
Larqui	-36.23197	530	
Larraín	-33.68333	367	
Larraín	-33.65	332	
las Acacias	-34.21667	338	
Las Aguadas	-37.50914	124	
Las Águilas	-35.30511	126	
las Águilas	-37.07271	1129	
la Sal	-26.33333	1467	
la Sal	-26.37908	1654	
La Sal	-26.36667	2117	
Las Ánimas	-33.73452	1079	(El Pangal, Las Animas, Estero Las Ánimas)
Las Ánimas	-40.24405	7	(Las Animas, Estero Las Ánimas, Las Animas, Las Animas)
Las Ánimas	-37.4027	464	
Las Ánimas	-46.29566	206	
Las Arenas	-34.05152	161	
Las Bayas	-33.36384	2313	
Las Cabras	-34.3	140	
Las Cabritas	-32.66667	724	(Cabritas, Estero Las Cabritas)
Las Cachañas	-37.38427	197	
Las Cadenas	-34.30224	111	(Cadenas, Estero Las Cadenas)
Las Cadenas	-34.19084	441	(Esteno La Cadena, Cadena, Estero Cadenas, Estero de Las Cadenas)
las Cardas	-34.58438	71	
Las Cardillas	-34.8865	22	(Las Cardillas, Estero Los Cardillos, Estero las Cardillas)
las Casas	-44.51342	714	
las Casas	-46.53912	286	
las Casas Viejas	-51.84627	15	
Las Caulles	-41.20174	65	(Las Caulles, Rio de las Caulles, de Las Caulles, Río de las Caulles)
Las Chacarillas	-33.96836	1735	
las Chacras	-46.50416	209	
Las Chicharras	-37.39049	324	
Las Chilcas	-37.27103	40	
Las Chilcas	-35.33714	123	(Chilcas, Estero Las Chilcas)
las Chinas	-51.24483	24	
Las Corrientes	-36.67766	698	
Las Cruces	-33.42838	468	
las Cumbres	-41.68317	22	
Las Damas	-38.70711	8	(Damas, Rio Las Damas, Damas, Río Las Damas)
Las Damas	-36.65268	600	(Las Damas, Damas)
Las Damas	-34.23471	267	(Las Damas, Estero las Damas)
las Damas	-34.96363	1808	(Las Damas, Rio de las Damas, de Las Damas, Río de las Damas)
las Delicias	-34.11667	477	
Las Diucas	-37.67619	121	
Las Diucas	-37.06826	52	
las Diucas	-33.92973	137	
Las Garzas	-34.7677	85	(Las Garzas, de Las Garza)
Las Garzas	-35.96013	137	
Las Garzas	-35.75828	603	
Las Garzas	-34.24093	197	
Las Golondrinas	-44.53724	696	
Las Gualtatas	-33.3693	802	
Las Heras	-53.09385	231	(La Heras, Estero Las Heras)
Las Heras	-37.38347	242	
Las Higueras	-33.56567	144	(Las Higueras, Estero Higuera, Estero de las Higueras)
Las Higueras	-33.58333	171	
las Hualtatas	-32.92252	1292	(las Gualtatas, Estero de las Hualtatas)
La Sirena	-33.7	810	
Las Lagunillas	-32.63702	2340	
las Lagunillas	-33.47196	179	
Las Lajas	-35.60421	82	
Las Leñas	-34.36317	1300	(Las Lenas, Rio de las Lenas, de Las Leñas, Río de las Leñas)
las Llaretas	-32.2	3357	
Las Máquinas	-35.08333	13	
Las Marcas	-41.35642	269	
Las Marias	-41.07889	59	
Las Mariposas	-33.52915	185	(La Mariposa, Estero de Las Mariposas)
Las Matreras	-43.75229	393	
Las Mazas	-32.95	870	
Las Mercedes	-35.7	305	
Las Mercedes	-33.47184	176	
las Minas	-53.16345	-9999	(Las Minas, Rio las Minas, Las Minas, Río de las Minas)
las Minas	-37.77464	72	
las Minas	-37.65937	244	
Las Minas	-40.91609	187	
Las Minas	-38.56602	382	
Las Minas	-52.69888	7	
Las Minillas	-32.60917	834	(Las Minillas, Las Minillas)
Las Monjas	-33.5689	976	(Las Monjas, Estero las Monjas)
las Mulas	-46.14154	287	(las Mulas, de las Mulas)
Las Nalcas	-38.21164	834	(Nalca, Estero Naloa, Las Nalcas, Las Nalcas)
Las Nieves	-37.07315	120	(Las Nieve, Estero Las Nieves)
las Niñas	-37.84849	151	
La Sombra	-35.90833	437	
Las Ovejas	-34.71614	106	(Las Ovejas, Estero las Ovejas)
Las Palmas	-33.55001	141	
Las Palmas	-33.07012	33	(Las Palmas, Estero de las Palmas)
Las Palmas	-35.42167	27	
Las Palmas	-35.28185	63	
Las Palmas	-34.85109	149	(Las Palmas, Estero Palmas)
Las Palmas	-34.15784	108	(Las Palmas, Estero las Palmas)
Las Palmas	-34.06477	108	(Las Palmas, Estero Palmas)
Las Palmas	-32.32653	298	
Las Pataguas	-35.31295	136	
Las Perdices	-33.60456	748	
Las Perras	-37.24184	323	
Las Piedras	-32.51557	2932	
Las Piedras	-36.51873	383	
Las Pircas de Mondaca	-28.21386	2377	
Las Pircas	-33.2544	2431	
Las Polvaredas	-32.93333	2362	
Las Quemas	-37.38957	229	
Las Quemas	-44.67184	403	
Las Quinguas	-33.64176	1933	
Las Raíces	-36.89572	272	
las Ramadas	-33.36261	2234	(Las Ramadas, Estero de las Ramadas)
Las Ramadillas	-33.8797	379	
Las Rosas	-33.35	829	
Las Rosas	-37.42698	35	
Las Tablas	-38.34504	604	
Las Tinajas	-33.38426	1946	
las Torres	-44.72526	258	
Las Toscas	-34.68183	199	
Las Toscas	-34.56501	152	(Las Toscas, Las Toscas, Las Toscas)
Las Toscas	-36.6304	93	
Las Toscas	-38.17844	367	
Las Toscas	-35.7766	113	
Las Vacas	-33.48531	1852	
Las Vegas	-35.45163	249	
Las Vegas	-35.40643	22	
Las Vegas	-32.8	416	
las Viedmas	-33.98716	505	
Las Yaretas	-33.31177	3115	
Latorre	-53.88333	201	
La Tranca	-41.4	61	
La Turbina	-44.54884	649	
Lauca	-19.16667	3661	(Lauca, Lauca)
Lauca	-18.36445	3664	
Laura	-43.79694	70	
Laureño	-39.81965	25	(Laurana, Estero Lauraña, Estero Laureno, Estero Laureño)
La Vega	-41.0675	105	
La Verde	-35.30598	107	
La Vieja	-37.26521	170	
La Viga	-40.0107	39	
la Viña	-33.54935	141	(La Vina, Estero de La Viña, Estero Vina, Estero de la Viña)
La Viña	-33.38333	233	
La Viña	-34.58002	71	
La Virgen	-40.45927	596	
la Yaretas	-32.20368	2953	(la Yaretas, de las Llaretas, de las Llaretas)
Layenco	-38.1739	192	
la Yerba Loca	-33.3444	1327	
la Yerba Loca	-31.4025	2419	
la Zorra	-43.1441	290	(La Zorra, Rio Zorra, de La Zorra, Río de la Zorra)
La Zorra	-41.48499	6	(la Zorra, de La Zorra, de La Zorra)
Lebicán	-42.80808	4	
Lebu	-37.59796	3	(Cupano, Rio Cupanu, Rio Cupaño, Rio Lebu, Cupañu, Río Lebu)
Lechoso	-46.29504	204	(Lechoso, Lechoso)
Lefuco	-38.47277	630	
Legleufu	-39.84453	93	(Legleufu, Estero Lleleufu)
Lehueluan	-38.25656	179	(Lahuelan, Estero Lehueluan)
Leiva	-37.80916	23	
Leiva	-32.08553	1994	
Leiva	-32.54885	3538	
Leñadura	-53.2331	8	(Lenadura, Rio Lenaduras, Leñadura, Río Leñaduras)
Lenca	-41.62118	4	
Lenqui	-41.76667	-9999	
Leonera	-33.26761	2616	
Leones	-46.71777	227	
Leones	-41.5109	393	
León	-47.64218	28	
Leufucade	-39.45321	72	(Leufucade, Rio Levufucade, Leufucade)
Leyda	-33.63345	132	
Lía	-37.26859	21	(Elias, Rio Lia, Elias, Río Lía)
Libertador	-42.45349	44	
Libno	-42.78333	6	(Libno, Libno, Libno)
Licancheo	-33.92346	6	
Licán	-40.64774	189	
Licauquen	-38.12414	96	(Licauquen, Licauquen, Licauquen)
Licauquén	-37.8015	17	
Licura	-37.64567	115	
Lídico	-38.78061	22	(Lidico, Estero Lídico, Lidico)
Lídico	-35.05	7	
Liguay	-35.91465	126	(Liguay, Liguay, Liguay)
Lihueimo	-34.43467	131	
Lilcopulli	-40.33671	11	
Lilipulli	-38.01667	149	
Limache	-32.92621	14	(Limache, Estero Limache)
Lima	-34.72443	191	
Limáhuida	-31.75169	289	
Limarí	-30.72956	8	
Limávida	-35.0186	44	
Limenmahuida	-38.16755	742	(Limenmahuida, Negra)
Limpio	-46.24429	286	(Limpio, Limpio)
Lindero	-40.85416	72	
Lindero	-39.13918	167	
Liñeco	-39.08922	497	
Liñeco	-37.62081	69	
Lingo Lingo	-33.91261	137	
Lingue	-38.1	95	
Lipelipe	-37.40793	40	
Lipimávida	-34.85072	97	
Lipingüe	-39.92994	56	
Lipín	-37.53948	455	
Lipinza	-39.99942	628	
Lircay	-35.37929	89	(Lircai, Rio Lircay, Lircai, Río Lircay)
Lircay	-35.87802	236	
Lirgueno	-37.91385	318	
Lirque	-37.82515	185	(Lirque, Lingue)
Lirquén	-37.67886	226	
Lirquén	-37.68333	245	
Lirquén	-36.70833	61	
Liucura	-39.27347	258	
Liucura	-38.64483	1018	
Liucura	-38.29858	244	
Liumalla	-39.41416	316	(Liumalla, Rio Lumalla, Liumalla, Río Lumalla)
Liuque	-38.25697	177	(Lauque, Estero Liuque, Estero Llanque)
Lladen	-37.98333	1104	
Llafenco	-39.33173	375	
Llaguepe	-41.72156	4	(Llaguepe, Rio Llahuape, Rio Llahuepe, Llaguepe, Río Llahuape, Río Llahuepe)
Llahuilo	-37.20486	70	(Llahuilo, Estero Llambilo)
Llaima	-38.88296	409	
Llallehue	-38.86612	10	(Llahuelle, Estero Llallehue)
Llallicura	-38.5	374	
Llamaico	-38.8	110	
Llamico	-35.6897	139	
Llampangui	-31.29362	672	(Llampangui, Llaucaven)
Llamuco	-38.67935	136	
Llamue	-39.73312	137	(Llamue, Estero Llamus)
Llanada	-48.012	88	
Llancahue	-39.6014	218	
Llancahue	-39.85876	163	
Llancahue	-38.73333	15	
Llancao	-37.94094	8	(Llancao, Llancao, Llancao)
Llancao	-38.81667	59	
Llanco	-41.93115	4	
Llano Largo	-31.37335	393	
Llanquén	-38.17279	725	
Llanquihue	-39.82513	131	
Llanquipa	-19.24822	4152	(Llanguipa, Llanquipa, de Llanquipa)
Llaullau	-39.30469	292	(Llaullau, Llaullau, Llaullau)
Llay	-37.71667	1447	
Llay-Llay	-40.79257	56	
Lleco	-39.44276	8	
Llecue	-39.85576	173	
Llefuén	-39.30082	219	(Lefuen, Llefuen, Llefuén)
Llenquereo	-37.56366	847	
Llepo	-35.91732	220	
Llesquehue	-40.53782	36	
Lleulleu	-38.08017	1	
Lleupeco	-38.74327	120	
Llicaldad	-42.52453	17	
Llicoca	-38.81197	4	
Llico	-41.291	22	
Llico	-37.19251	9	
Llihuin	-39.13487	88	(Llihuin, Rio Llinhuin, Llihuin, Río Llinhuin)
Llillil	-39.56284	1	
Llinco	-38.53314	28	(Collinco, Estero Llinco)
Llin	-42.59522	23	
Lliuco	-40.88969	100	(Guaguan, Lliuco, Lliuco)
Lliuco	-40.84025	60	
Lliuco	-38.85	39	
Lliulliu	-39.26757	247	
Lliu-Lliu	-32.99915	92	
Llizán	-39.75412	343	(Lizan, Rio Llizan, Lizán, Río Llizán)
Lloco	-39.15028	95	
Llollehue	-40.33531	8	(Llollehue, Rio Llollelhue, Llollehue, Río Llollelhue)
Llollelhue	-39.01177	38	
Llolleo	-33.61528	10	
Llollinco	-37.23833	67	
Llollinco	-35.8738	122	
Lloncochaigua	-42.373	43	(Lloncochagua, Loncochaigue, Loncochaigüe, Lloncochallan, Lloncochaigua, Rio Lloncochaigue, Rio Loncochallhua, Lloncochaigua, Río Lloncochaigüe, Río Loncochallhua)
Llope	-34.62157	120	(Llope, Llope)
Llopinco	-38.28333	100	
Lluco	-38.96667	87	
Llullun	-38.31667	209	
Lluta	-18.4138	12	(Lluta, Lluta)
Lo Abarca	-33.52742	33	
Loa	-21.42996	3	
Loanco	-35.56667	8	(Loanco, Rio Luanco, Loanco, Río Luanco)
Loanco	-37.79792	677	(Loanco, Estero de Lonco)
Lobos	-41.40609	69	(Lobos, Arenas, Rio Lobo, Arenas, Río Lobo)
Locobe	-37.43925	17	(Locobe, Locobe)
Loica	-33.91598	129	
Lolco	-38.12228	657	(Lolco, El Volantin, Quebrada El Volantín, Lolca, Rio Lolco, Rio Nolco, Lolca, Río Lolco, Río Nolco)
Lolco	-36.45641	104	
Lolcura	-38.71757	12	
Lolenco	-38.33057	53	
Lolenco	-37.86342	95	
Lolén	-38.47494	892	
Lolén	-38.99172	74	
Lolohue	-38.10985	144	(Lolahue, Estero Lolohue)
Lolol	-34.69368	78	(Lolol, Lolol)
Loma Blanca	-35.20529	22	
Loma de Piedra	-41.09581	113	(Loma Piedra, Estero Lomo Piedra)
Loma Huacha	-44.44563	1047	
Lomas Coloradas	-33.31964	2329	
Lomín	-38.10002	653	
Loncomilla	-35.57453	67	(Loncomilla, Rio Lonconilla, Loncomilla, Río Lonconilla)
Loncopan	-37.3699	458	
Loncotripai	-38.39932	18	
Loncovaca	-38.774	879	(Loncovaca, Rio Loncoyan, Loncovaca, Río Loncoyán)
Loncovilo	-39.37617	387	
Longaví	-35.83226	101	
Longlong	-39.00462	152	(Longlona, Rio Longlong, Longlona, Río Longlong)
Longlong	-38.55877	224	
Longotoma	-32.4	223	
Lonquén	-36.43256	15	
Lonquimay	-38.43502	876	(Lonquimai, Rio Lonquimay, Lonquimai, Río Lonquimay)
Lontué	-34.98018	151	
Lo Orrego	-33.39301	212	(Orrego, de Lo Orrego, Estero de Lo Orrego Abajo)
Lo Ovalle	-33.30773	260	(Lo Oralle, Estero Lo Ovalle)
López Chico	-41.08333	121	
López	-40.97897	67	
López	-43.65948	518	
Lo Pinto	-33.26667	513	
Lorino	-32.85008	439	
Loro	-33.85	2624	
Loro	-43.58756	58	
Los Alerces	-37.81167	310	
Los Altos de Caune	-34.9378	123	(Los Altos de Caune, Estero de los Altos de Caune)
Los Ángeles	-33.48333	177	(Angeles, Estero Anjeles, Estero Los Angeles, Estero de Los Ángeles)
Los Angeles	-32.43019	228	(Cajon Los Angeles, Estero Cajón de Los Ángeles, Estero Los Angeles, Estero de los Angeles, Estero de los Ángeles)
los Ángeles	-32.43333	425	(Los Anjeles, Estero de los Angeles, Estero de los Ángeles)
Los Apestados	-35.78552	125	(Los Apestados, Los Apeslados)
Los Arcos	-41.36597	43	
los Azules	-32.48538	3162	
Los Bagres	-36.36408	1242	(Los Bagres, Estero los Bagres)
Los Bajos	-33.61667	624	
Los Baños	-40.85923	137	(Los Banos, Estero Los Baños, Estero los Banos, Estero de los Baños)
Los Borrachos	-37.38406	277	
los Caiquenes	-50.84781	163	(los Caiquenes, Rio los Colquenes, de los Caiquenes, Río los Colquenes)
los Calabozos	-36.19804	1092	
Los Campos	-33.00495	712	(Los Campos, Estero de los Campos)
Los Canales El Molino	-34.75727	262	
Los Canelos	-38.84876	432	(Canelos, Estero El Canelo, Estero Los Canelos)
Los Canelos	-37.38328	294	
Los Canelos	-44.69057	306	
los Capados	-40.98762	111	
Los Caracoles	-37.27355	898	
Los Cardos	-34.6864	146	(Los Cardos, Estero de los Cardos)
Los Castaños	-33.27808	2395	
Los Chacales	-46.51919	475	
Los Chinos	-32.85	513	
los Choros	-29.30538	5	(Los Choros, Quebrada los Choros, Los Choros, Rio de los Choros, Los Choros)
Los Chuchos	-37.42174	717	
los Ciervos	-53.20249	3	(Los Ciervos, Rio los Ciervos, Los Ciervos, Río de los Ciervos)
Los Cipreses	-35.80877	836	(Los Cipreces, Rio Los Ciprees, Rio Los Cipreses, Rio los Cipreses, Los Cipreces, Río Los Ciprees, Río Los Cipreses, Río de los Cipreses)
Los Cipreses	-34.32771	1054	(Cipreses, Rio Los Cipreses, Cipreses, Río Los Cipreses)
Los Cipreses	-37.34882	717	
los Cipreses	-34.44088	1351	(los Cipreses, de los Cipreses)
los Colhuines	-41.3	122	
los Coligües	-37.36995	117	
Los Colihues	-33.15946	225	
Los Corralillos	-33.48333	252	(Corralillos, Estero Corrolillos, Estero Los Corralillos)
Los Cristales	-41.79728	97	
Los Cristales	-36.1548	1046	(Los Cristales, Estero los Cristales)
Los Cuervos	-35.03982	8	
Los Guayes	-36.08504	405	(Los Guayes, Estero los Guayes)
Los Guindos	-36.6077	472	(Guindos, Estero Los Guindos, Guindos)
Los Guindos	-33.87805	115	
Los Helados	-31.65381	2271	(Helados, Los Helados, Los Helados)
Los Huemules	-45.87662	19	
Los Huinganes	-37.38208	598	(Huinganes, Estero Los Huinganes)
Los Italianos	-33.58333	171	
Los Laureles	-34.63421	169	
Los Laureles	-37.63917	213	
Los Leones	-32.72838	2319	(Leones, Rio Los Leones, Rio de los Leones, Leones, Río de Los Leones, Río de los Leones)
los Leones	-32.96781	1896	(Los Leones, Rio de los Leones, de Los Leones, Río de los Leones)
Los Lingues	-34.10905	236	(Lingues, Estero Los Lingues)
Los Litres	-32.77578	204	
Los Llanos	-39.94273	7	(Los Llanos, Rio los Llanos, Los Llanos, Río los Llanos)
Los Lleulles	-37.8008	202	
Los Lleuques	-38.74426	798	
Los Loros	-32.84172	374	(Los Loros)
Los Mallines	-42.87528	614	
Los Maquis	-38.40465	22	
los Matreros	-44.68196	1041	(los Matreros, Los Matreros)
Los Mayos	-33.56749	138	(Los Magos, Estero de Los Mayos, Estero de los Mayos)
Los Mayos	-32.8	40	(Los Magos, Estero Los Mayos)
Los Molles	-30.74375	1218	(Los Molles, Rio las Molles, Los Molles, Río de las Molles)
Los Molles	-32.23967	9	(Los Molles, Estero Molles)
Los Ñadis	-47.50352	71	(Los Nadis, Rio de las Nadis, de Los Ñadis, Río de las Ñadis)
Los Notros	-37.42523	108	
Los Olguines	-33.68333	1151	
los Oyarzos	-41.40413	21	(Oyarzo, Rio los Oyarzos, Oyarzo, Río de los Oyarzos)
Los Padres	-37.52766	641	
los Palos	-53.02377	5	
los Palos	-45.37434	5	(Los Palos, de Los Palos)
Los Palos	-37.1	1452	
Los Palquiales	-34.42121	140	
Los Panguiles	-33.43333	201	
los Paños	-36.74101	1011	
los Pantanos	-37.62097	177	
los Pantanos	-37.66308	388	
Los Pasos	-40.55154	192	(Los Pasos, Estero los Pazos)
los Patos	-37.30419	19	
los Patos	-52.9392	4	(Chorrillo Los Patos, los Patos, Rio los Palos, de los Patos, Río los Palos)
los Patos	-41.26246	40	
Los Patos	-40.28981	10	
Los Patos	-44.55309	720	(los Patos, Los Patos, Estero los Patos)
Los Patos	-41.37075	138	
los Pejerreyes	-34.99956	713	(los Pejerreyes, de los Pejerreyes)
los Pelambres	-31.80411	1895	(Pelambres, los Pelambres, de los Pelambres)
Los Pellines	-41.13635	145	
los Peucos	-37.07167	1108	
Los Piches	-33.21245	2563	
Los Pinos	-37.56323	129	
Los Potrerillos	-33.52801	1188	
Los Pozuelos	-52.2248	149	
Los Puercos	-35.46034	45	
Los Queñes	-35.21667	806	
Los Quillayes	-34.11912	23	
Los Radales	-37.41802	712	
Los Ramos	-38.54777	417	
Los Recauquenes	-33.38668	1222	
Los Riecillos	-32.75584	1896	
Los Riocitos	-32.31667	1768	
Los Riscos	-40.79757	371	
Los Robles	-35.77905	151	
Los Robles	-35.47457	268	
Los Robles	-35.32261	127	
Los Rucos	-37.25067	1407	
los Sapos	-37.08749	96	
Los Sauces	-36.67844	670	
Los Sótanos	-37.37828	172	
Los Temos	-38.2479	183	
Los Timones	-37.35458	1414	
Los Tres Esteros	-40.74772	75	
Los Valles	-32.95431	782	
Los Valles	-34.33295	296	
Lualahue	-38.09552	131	
Luanco	-37.23545	154	
Luanrelún	-38.01276	284	(Luanrelun, Estero Luanrelún, La Bruja)
Lucac	-46.70739	5	
Lucanay	-37.38333	267	
Lucio	-46.76767	788	
Lumaco	-38.44474	35	
Lumaco	-40.60144	61	
Lumaco	-40.38745	99	
Lumaco	-40.02345	69	
Lumaco	-39.97697	198	
Lumaco	-39.98219	9	
Lumaco	-39.18259	481	(Iumaco, Estero Lumaco)
Lumaco	-39.01732	157	(Lumaco, Lumaco, Lumaco)
Luma	-39.36242	193	
Lumaquina	-38.28458	55	
Lupe Chico	-19.88578	3984	(Lupe Chico, Lupe Chico)
Lupe Grande	-19.89443	3953	(Lupe Grande, Lupe Grande, Lupe Grande)
Lutún	-40.57687	21	
Macal	-37.35124	154	
Machaco	-39.88013	51	
Macha	-38.41032	37	
Machalí	-34.11295	480	(Machali, Machali, Estero Machalí)
Machicura	-35.78494	163	
Machihueco	-38.324	98	
Macho	-37.25977	867	
Machuca	-22.62268	3467	
MacKlelland	-53.63562	3	(MacClelland, Rio MacKlelland, MacClelland, Río MacKlelland)
Macusa	-18.88745	3696	
Madilhue	-38.44682	49	
Máfil	-39.68422	11	(Mafil, Rio Mafit, Mafit, Río Máfil)
Magdalena	-44.52889	666	
Mahuidanche	-39.03402	31	(Mahuidan, Rio Mahuidanche, Rio Mahuidanchi, Mahuidanche, Río Mahuidanchi)
Mahuilque	-38.20836	9	(Mahuilque, Estero Manuilque, Mahuilque, Mahuilque)
Maichín	-39.34896	385	
Maihueco	-42.82975	31	
Maihuin	-40.08852	200	
Mailenco	-39.36523	3	
Maipo	-37.51772	629	(Maipo, Maipo, Maipo)
Maipo	-33.61305	1	
Maipo	-37.47354	116	
Maipué	-40.97883	66	
Maiquén	-40.07823	617	
Maitenco	-38.4219	324	
Maitenes	-35.04846	1316	(Los Maitenes, Rio Maitenes, Los Maitenes, Río Maitenes)
Maitenes	-33.4493	1845	
Maitén	-47.16964	308	
Maitén	-41.18333	428	
Maitén	-32.85429	1165	
Maitenlahue	-33.8362	10	
Maitenrehue	-37.59659	146	(Maitenrehue, Maitenrehue)
Malalcahuello	-38.86369	534	
Malalcha	-38.85	41	
Malalche	-38.56451	44	
Malalcura	-37.35986	770	
Malalhue	-39.05488	651	
Malalhue	-38.94973	5	
Malihue	-39.62597	223	(Malihue, Malihue, Malihue)
Malihue	-39.7456	73	(Malihue, Estero Malilhue)
Malito	-43.47279	53	(Malito, Rio Melita, Malito, Río Melita)
Malla	-38	789	
Mallarauco	-33.61667	340	
Mallarauco	-33.56667	273	
Malleco	-37.7806	68	(Malleco, Malleco)
Mallenco	-38.25568	293	
Mallermo	-34.2747	128	(Mallermo, Estero Miguel Chico)
Mallín Chileno	-44.52028	682	(Mallin, Rio Mallin Chileno, Rio Mallín, Mallín Chileno)
Mallines	-43.66667	551	
Mallines	-44.01835	268	
Malloga	-37.3121	19	(Malloga, Estero Moyoga)
Malo	-35.11304	1560	
Malo	-29.83352	3250	(Malo, Rio los Banos, Malo, Río de los Baños)
Mal Paso	-39.91667	95	
Malulco	-38.91783	661	
Malven	-37.63334	96	
Mamá	-34.23505	2148	(Mama, Mama, Estero Mamá)
Mampil	-37.52658	532	(Mampil, Estero Manpil)
Manantial Amargo	-33.36667	839	
Manantiales	-32.98333	2569	
Manantiales	-34.09627	186	
Manao	-41.8819	6	
Manco	-37.0419	10	
Manflas	-28.03344	1191	(Manflas, Rio Manflias, Manflas)
Manga de Millar	-41	89	(Manga, Estero Manga Millar)
Mañiguales	-46.7572	2	(Maniguales, Rio Manihuales, Rio Maniuales, Rió Mañihuales, Mañiguales, Río Mañiualés)
Mañiguales	-45.29614	78	(Manihuales, Rio Maniuales, Mañihuales, Río Mañiuales)
Manihueico	-41.76456	3	
Mañío	-41.39395	111	
Mañío	-39.25123	134	
Mañío	-38.74162	18	(Manio, Estero Mañío, Manio, Mañio)
Manito	-38.46844	191	
Mañiu	-39.74962	99	
Manquecuel	-37.73225	148	(Manquecuel, Manquecuel, Manquecuel)
Manquehue	-34.10884	237	
Manso	-41.73333	316	(Manso, Manso)
Manso	-48.6875	252	
Manso	-46.14708	310	
Mantilhue	-40.63848	193	
Mañuca	-40.93031	62	
Manzanillo	-38.47114	924	(Manzanillo, Coloradito, Coloradito)
Manzanito	-33.78509	1249	
Manzanito	-33.3504	1299	(Barros Negros, Estero Manzanito)
Manzano	-31.93614	1119	(Manzano, Manzano)
Manzano	-33.58444	846	(El Manzano, Estero Manzano)
Manzano	-38.29321	258	
Manzano	-32.27396	9	
Manzano	-33.56667	164	
Mapocho	-33.70974	256	(Mapocho, Mapocho)
Máquina	-41.79062	1	
Maquis	-34.4967	519	(Los Maquis, Arroyo Maquis, Maquis)
Maravillas	-34.51156	1826	
Marazzi	-53.47828	3	(Marazzi, Rio Odioso, Marazzi)
Mardones	-32.91459	2459	
Marga Marga	-33.02056	18	
María Luisa	-46.30313	16	
María Pinto	-33.51667	154	
Marilmó	-42.21667	-9999	
Marta	-45.33403	33	
Mascarello	-54.48204	7	
Matancilla	-35.99986	162	
Matanzas	-33.96492	27	(Matanza, Estero Matanzas)
Matanzas	-41.68285	21	(Matanzas, Matanzas, Matanzas)
Mataquito	-34.97301	0	(Mataquito, Mataquito)
Matranquil	-38.35146	6	(Macranqui, Estero Matranquil, Matraquin, Matraquin)
Matrilhue	-38.88333	67	
Matus	-38.77138	335	
Mauco	-33.37228	336	(Manco, Estero del Mauco)
Maule	-41.06314	143	
Maule	-41.01115	86	
Maule	-35.3173	3	
Maule	-34.21667	309	
Maule	-36.76074	112	
Maullín	-41.60852	1	
Maurino	-33.58333	933	
Mauro	-31.96138	806	(Mauro, Mauro)
Mayamo	-41.95	7	
Mayer	-48.45232	259	(Mayer, Mayer)
Mayor	-47.17664	96	
Mayul	-42.66542	16	
Mazazo	-41.73593	24	(Mazaso, Rio Mazazo, Mazaso, Río Mazazo)
Mazzino	-32.78333	239	
Meadero	-35.30969	258	
Mechaico	-41.93749	50	
Mechai	-42.86405	9	(Mechai, Mechai, Rio Mechay, Mechai, Río Mechay)
Meco	-36.73965	86	
Meco	-38.45574	303	
Meco	-38.15363	156	
Medahue	-38.31567	342	
Medihueco	-38.22722	5	
Medina	-42.96492	3	
Medio	-52.31258	325	
Medio	-29.55564	2814	
Medio	-28.2581	2376	
Medio	-28.27653	2216	(Medio, del Medio, del Medio)
Medio	-40.37543	97	
Medio	-33.64228	1929	
Medio	-41.02388	102	
Melado	-35.71326	508	
Mela	-36.35857	7	(Mela, Estero Meta)
Melilebú	-42.72674	31	
Melileufu	-40.56997	34	
Melimoyu	-43.96811	35	
Melinchique	-38.11867	97	(Melinchique, Melinchique, Melinchique)
Melipué	-40.3446	150	
Melisque	-39.55705	175	
Melocotón	-33.69225	1017	
Melón	-32.75987	217	
Membrillo	-38.85344	466	
Membrillo	-36.00616	141	(Chimbarongo, Estero Membrillo)
Membrillo	-34.65324	49	
Mena	-32.83333	273	
Mencahue	-40.56561	102	
Menelhue	-36.54322	95	(Menelhue, Estero Menerenhue, Menelhue, Menelhue)
Meneses	-35.59081	1777	
Meñir	-37.61399	284	
Menor	-43.46185	114	
Menural	-37.31627	25	
Mercedes	-42.76762	14	
Metalqui	-42.21841	10	
Metrenco	-38.82543	85	
Metrequen	-41.97318	-9999	(Metrenque, Rio Metrenquen, Rio Metrequen, Metrenque, Río Metrenquen, Río Metrequen)
Metri	-41.58544	23	(Chaicamo, Estero Chaícamo, Estero Metri, Chaicamo, Chaicamó)
Micauquen	-37.69847	91	(Micauquen, Estero Nicauquen)
Michinmahuida	-42.86972	564	
Millahue	-31.62238	1	
Millantué	-40.74901	77	
Millauquén	-36.33539	152	
Millinco	-38.68333	49	
Minas	-36.8119	864	
Minas	-39.89314	327	
Minas	-39.66491	109	
Minchinmávida	-43.10825	35	(Michimahuida, Rio Minchinmavida, Michimahuida, Río Minchinmávida)
Mininco	-37.76565	120	
Mininco	-37.7	389	(Mininco, Huequecura, Rio Mininco, Huequecura, Río Mininco)
Mininco	-37.67313	230	
Mininco	-37.90158	97	
Mirador	-43.08401	8	
Miraflores	-33.41667	189	
Miragualai	-43.54263	14	(Mirahualai, Maragualay, Rio Miragualai, Rio Miragualay, Maragualay, Río Miragualai, Río Miragualay)
Mirales	-41.14402	92	
Mirta	-43.89424	48	
Mirta	-42.21333	588	
Misquihué	-41.53333	24	
Mitranquén	-38.50624	922	(Mitranque, Rio Mitranquen, Rio Ancho, Mitranque, Río Mitranquén, Río del Ancho)
Mocho	-40.06172	423	
Mocho	-40.31491	70	
Mogote	-36.70951	1203	
Mogotes	-45.91318	325	(Mogote, Mogote)
Molco	-38.82154	54	
Molhue	-40.31103	42	(Malhue, Estero Molhue)
Molina	-33.37369	1144	
Molin	-41.76764	9	(Molin)
Molinillos	-36.28543	1538	
Molino de Oro	-40.31992	309	(Molino Oro, Molino de Oro, Molino de Oro)
Molino	-41.70785	204	(Huito, Estero Molino, Molino, del Molino, del Molino)
Molino	-37.1633	16	
Molino	-41.32353	86	
Molino	-37.68163	68	
Molino	-35.91054	9	(Molinos, Estero Molino)
Molino	-41.49366	14	
Molino	-41.38333	61	
Molino	-40.66909	39	
Molino	-38.37942	19	
Molino	-37.11161	44	(Molino, Molino)
Molino	-36.46418	105	
Molino	-35.04776	7	
Molluco	-38.7	29	
Mollueco	-42.85392	3	
Molpichagua	-38.52318	208	
Molulco	-42.84139	4	
Momolluco	-39.55264	977	(Momo Iluco, Rio Momolluco, Momo Iluco, Río Momolluco)
Moncol	-38.0371	1224	(Moncol, Moncol, Moncol)
Moncul	-38.74914	1	
Mondungo	-37.73886	151	
Moneda	-53.00982	182	(Chorrillo Moneda, Moneda)
Monlu	-38.48333	100	
Monos de Agua	-32.9694	2748	
Monsalve	-35.6876	1455	
Monte Águila	-37.08703	104	
Montecarabe	-19.4152	3727	
Monte	-34.43399	147	
Monte Largo	-36.29344	171	
Monte Loma	-37.76163	178	
Montenegro	-33	714	
Montiglio	-38.42808	509	
Montolo	-39.98271	187	
Montosa	-28.18281	1680	
Montriel	-41.56622	12	
Morera	-37.33562	54	
Moritz	-53.687	7	(Green, Rio Moritz, Green, Río Moritz)
Moro	-44.66561	485	
Moro	-40.82667	133	
Moro	-40.67907	121	
Morro	-40.55712	302	
Morros	-41.55	1227	
Mosco	-48.4818	268	(Mosco, Mosco)
Moscoso	-33.09151	164	
Mostazal	-30.84037	688	(Mostazal, Rio Motazal, Mostazal, Río Motazal)
Moteros	-33.25779	61	
Moya	-37.16253	41	
Muco	-38.618	171	
Muco	-38.51667	716	
Muicolpué	-40.60341	99	(Riachuello Muicolpue, Riachuello Muicolpué, Muicolpue, Muicolpué)
Mui	-41.88449	41	
Mulas	-37.11279	469	
Mulchén	-37.7202	131	
Mulluri	-19.07371	3907	(Mulluri, Mulluri, de Mulluri)
Mulpun	-39.78924	16	
Mulul	-39.40731	92	
Mundo Nuevo	-37.41013	95	
Munizaga	-53.77044	182	
Muqueral	-36.9959	175	(Lircay, Estero Muqueral, Estero Lircai)
Murta	-46.40307	234	
Museo	-33.40763	2340	(Museo, Museo, Museo)
Muticao	-40.47749	77	
Nacimiento	-35.10021	1503	
Nacimiento	-53.38795	91	(Nacimi, Estero Nacimiento)
Ñadi	-41.31087	88	(Nade, Rio Nadi,Ñade, Río Ñadi)
Ñadi	-40.92823	137	
Naguilán	-39.95212	4	
Nahue	-37.55792	391	
Nahuelcura	-38.9382	335	(Nahuelcura, Nahulcura, Rio Nahulcuro, Nahulcura)
Nahuelcura	-37.01166	172	
Nahuel	-37.31081	28	
Nalalguaca	-39.6325	180	(Nalalguaca, Estero Nalalguaco)
Nalalhuaca	-39.60968	202	
Nalcadero	-38.56996	659	
Nalcas	-40.89182	126	
Namica	-32.96667	96	
Nancagua	-37.53759	123	
Ñanco	-37.92856	275	(Manco, Estero Nanco, Estero Ñanco, Nanco,Ñanco)
Ñanco	-33.64658	30	
Ñanco	-38.46725	659	
Ñanco	-38.31575	212	
Ñanco	-37.92848	275	
Ñanco	-37.71014	278	
Ñancul	-39.7156	286	
Ñango	-42.39693	71	
Nañihue	-39.66101	4	(Manihue, Rio Nanihue, Mañihue, Río Nañihue)
Napaco	-41.10393	10	
Naranjo	-38.4604	914	
Natales	-51.72169	6	
Natri	-42.83911	8	
Natri Pangal	-43.03062	49	
Navarro	-53.70518	264	(Navarro, Navarro, Navarro)
Navarro	-32.91697	2456	(Cajon Navarro, de Navarro, de Navarro, Navarro, Navarro)
Navidad	-33.93932	12	
Navío	-35.97657	273	(Navio, Navio, Quebrada Navío)
Neculqueo	-38.71667	150	
Nef	-47.12061	210	(Neff, Neff)
Negra	-31.48653	1359	(Agua Negra, Negra)
Negro	-47.76785	15	
Negro	-46.70713	6	
Negro	-45.76656	484	
Negro	-42.68086	11	
Negro	-43.31199	15	
Negro	-41.96105	3	
Negro	-42.74097	3	
Negro	-41.96415	2	
Negro	-41.83749	61	
Negro	-41.45	73	
Negro	-41.41915	234	
Negro	-41.40383	36	
Negro	-41.05539	192	
Negro	-41.00662	356	
Negro	-40.79974	147	
Negro	-40.63224	22	(Negro, Rio Negro Hueco, Negro, Río Negro Hueco)
Negro	-38.94265	376	
Negro	-38.54219	648	
Negro	-38.45541	559	
Negro	-37.50029	151	
Negro	-35.33035	1359	
Negro	-34.093	2089	
Negro	-31.39171	2495	
Negro	-44.44232	953	
Negro	-40.76546	254	
Negro	-38.36708	1044	
Negro	-38.09105	875	(Negro, Negro, Negro)
Negro	-29.83273	3228	(Negro, Negro)
Negro	-42.5175	20	
Negro	-42.93949	4	
Negro	-41.94861	24	
Negro	-42.5875	294	
Negro	-45.37687	81	
Negro	-41.48837	4	
Negro Juan	-45.27828	540	
Neicuf	-39.00108	31	
Neptune	-44.47308	752	
Ñereco	-38.41667	350	(Nereco, Estero Nirca, Estero Ñereco, Estero Ñirca)
Nerquihue	-34.7133	107	(Nerquihue, Estero Norquihue, Nerquihue)
Nevado	-43.39008	47	
Nevado	-35.3418	2392	
Nevado	-27.93622	3273	
Nevados	-44.19377	279	
Nevados	-36.07029	1062	
Newman	-46.53586	21	
Niblinto	-38.17196	527	
Niblinto	-36.58708	234	
Nicodahue	-37.59582	132	
Ñico	-41.8452	283	(Nico, Estero Ñico)
Niebla	-45.54243	460	
Nieblas	-36.08741	2218	
Nielol	-38.46861	64	
Nieve	-46.09323	870	
Nieves	-46.79817	689	
Nieves	-37.56226	547	
Niguen	-39.36097	117	
Nihué	-41.00302	94	
Nihuinco	-38.38333	605	
Nihuinco	-37.73482	174	
Nilahue	-40.25713	64	(Milahue, Rio Nilahue, Milahue, Río Nilahue)
Nilahue	-34.51821	12	
Ñilhue	-33.9557	164	(Nihue, Estero Nilhue, Estero Ñihue, Estero Ñilhue)
Nilpe	-38.51187	60	(Nilpe, Nilpe)
Nilque	-40.71824	193	
Niltre	-39.71261	138	(Niltre, Estero Nitre)
Ninhue	-36.47111	60	
Nininco	-37.07684	147	
Ñinquihue	-36.50249	99	(Ninquihue, Estero Niquihue, Estero Ñinquihue)
Ñipaco	-37.82997	80	(Nipaco, Estero Nitaco, Estero Ñipaco)
Ñipas	-36.44073	37	
Ñipilco	-37.15582	247	
Ñiquén	-36.16966	135	
Ñirca	-38.55	200	(Nereco, Estero Nirca, Estero Ñereco, Estero Ñirca)
Ñireguao	-45.21433	488	(Coichel, Rio Goichel, Coichel, Río Goichel)
Ñireguao	-45.16631	156	(Nirevao, Nirehuau, Rio Nirihuao, Nirehuau, Río Ñirihuao,Ñirevao)
Niremetún	-37.7	1017	
Ñirepu	-38.3406	412	
Nirivilo	-35.56062	170	
Ñirreco	-38.37199	845	(Chilpeco, Estero Mirreco, Estero Nireco, Estero Nirreco, Estero Ñireco, Estero Ñirreco)
Nochaco	-40.87337	129	
Nogales	-32.75358	265	
Nogueira	-53.65817	19	(Ner, Rio Nogueira, Ner, Río Nogueira)
Nonuco	-39.64319	22	
Noreste	-43.18894	328	
Norte	-48.06572	384	
Norte	-43.37262	76	
Norte	-41.21647	631	
Norte	-46.48997	134	
Norte	-45.21167	521	
Noschaco	-39.75141	172	
Notué	-42.6631	4	(Natue, Rio Natué, Rio Notue, Notué)
Ñuble	-36.63675	29	
Nuevo	-53.33215	14	(Celmira, Rio Nuevo, Nuevo)
Nupangui	-38.02413	160	
Obstáculo	-48.86217	252	
Ocacucho	-19.85969	3886	
Ochagavía	-33.5	451	
Oeste	-43.66254	92	
O’Higgins	-52.88423	102	
Ojo de Agua	-32.86422	2121	
Ojos de Agua de Putana	-22.51667	4534	(Ojos Agua de Putana, Arroyo Ojos de Putana)
Ojotas	-31.98818	3596	
Olivares	-33.49501	1538	
Olla	-31.4667	1534	
Ollero	-41.66667	7	(Corhuio, Rio Ollero, Corhuio, Río Ollero)
Olmopulli	-41.5812	1	
Onas	-53.20256	10	(Ona, Arroyo Onas)
Oñoico	-38.72418	88	(Ono, Estero Onoico, Estero Oño, Estero Oñoico)
Oñoico	-38.73143	39	(Onoico, Estero Onolco, Estero Oñoico, Estero Oñolco)
Oñolco	-35.09048	20	
Ononoco	-38.44497	35	
Ononoco	-38.4	128	
Oroco	-41.44058	23	
Oro	-53.8449	12	
Ortegas	-36.37691	955	(Ortegas, Estero Ortegus, Estero Ortega)
Ortiz	-37.23924	116	
Ortuzur	-33.5536	508	
Oscar	-52.7831	3	
Oscar	-46.74546	5	
Oscuro del Salto	-41.47691	10	(Oscuro, Rio Oscuro Salto, Oscuro, Río Oscuro del Salto)
Oscuro	-46.38202	23	
Oscuro	-45.85729	486	
Oscuro	-41.44741	30	
Ostiones	-41.5047	3	
Overa	-40.41889	347	
Overo Negro	-44.53959	686	
