= Dillo Dirt =

Type of compost made by the City of Austin, Texas, U.S.

Dillo Dirt is a compost made by the City of Austin, Texas since 1989. It was the first program of its kind in the state and one of the oldest in the nation. Dillo Dirt is named after the nine-banded armadillo (Dasypus novemcinctus), which is a mammal native to Texas. It is also a trademarked product of the City of Austin Water Department.

The unique difference between Dillo Dirt and normal compost is that it contains treated municipal sewage sludge along with yard trimmings collected curbside by the City of Austin Resource Recovery Department. These are combined and composted to create Dillo Dirt. Despite this fact, Dillo Dirt meets all Texas and U.S. Environmental Protection Agency requirements for "unrestricted" use, which even includes vegetable gardens.

The heat generated in composting (130 to 170 °F (50 to 80 °C)) is sufficient to virtually eliminate human and plant pathogens. After active composting for more than a month, the compost is "cured" for several months, and then screened to produce the finished product.

According to the City of Austin, Dillo Dirt contains levels of heavy metals including arsenic, cadmium, copper, lead, mercury, molybdenum, nickel, selenium, and zinc. In a separate toxicological analysis of Dillo Dirt, levels of the following pollutants were found: beta-BHC, DDE, dieldrin, endrin aldehyde, benzo(b)fluoranthene, dibenz(a,h)anthracene, benzo(a)anthracene, indeno(1,2,3-cd)pyrene, and bis(2-ethylhexyl)phthalate. Very few tests have been carried out on Dillo Dirt, so its average pollutant, radioactivity, and carcinogen levels are generally unknown.

== Controversy ==
Some opponents of the use and sale of Dillo Dirt claim that it contains above-normal amounts of heavy metals and fluoride that will inevitably find their way back into the human food supply. The city, however, states that the metal levels are well below the federal allowable levels. The city does not test for radioactivity or pharmaceutical residue because it is cost prohibitive. Since people routinely flush medications down the toilet against the city's recommendation, Dillo Dirt may contain pharmaceutical residue in some batches. Some medical residue is radioactive from treating cancer patients.

Prior to the Austin City Limits Music Festival, held at Zilker Park in Austin on October 4, 2009, the park's soil was resurfaced and amended with Dillo Dirt. During the festival, heavy rains created a large amount of sludgy surface mud, which some concertgoers claim caused them health issues, such as skin rashes, but in the end no conclusive evidence that the Dillo Dirt caused any problems was determined. The local Austin American Statesman newspaper ran an article advising anyone affected to call the health department.

== See also ==
- Biosolids
