= Marl Chemical Park =

Industrial park in Marl, North Rhine-Westphalia, Germany

Marl Chemical Park Chemiepark Marl
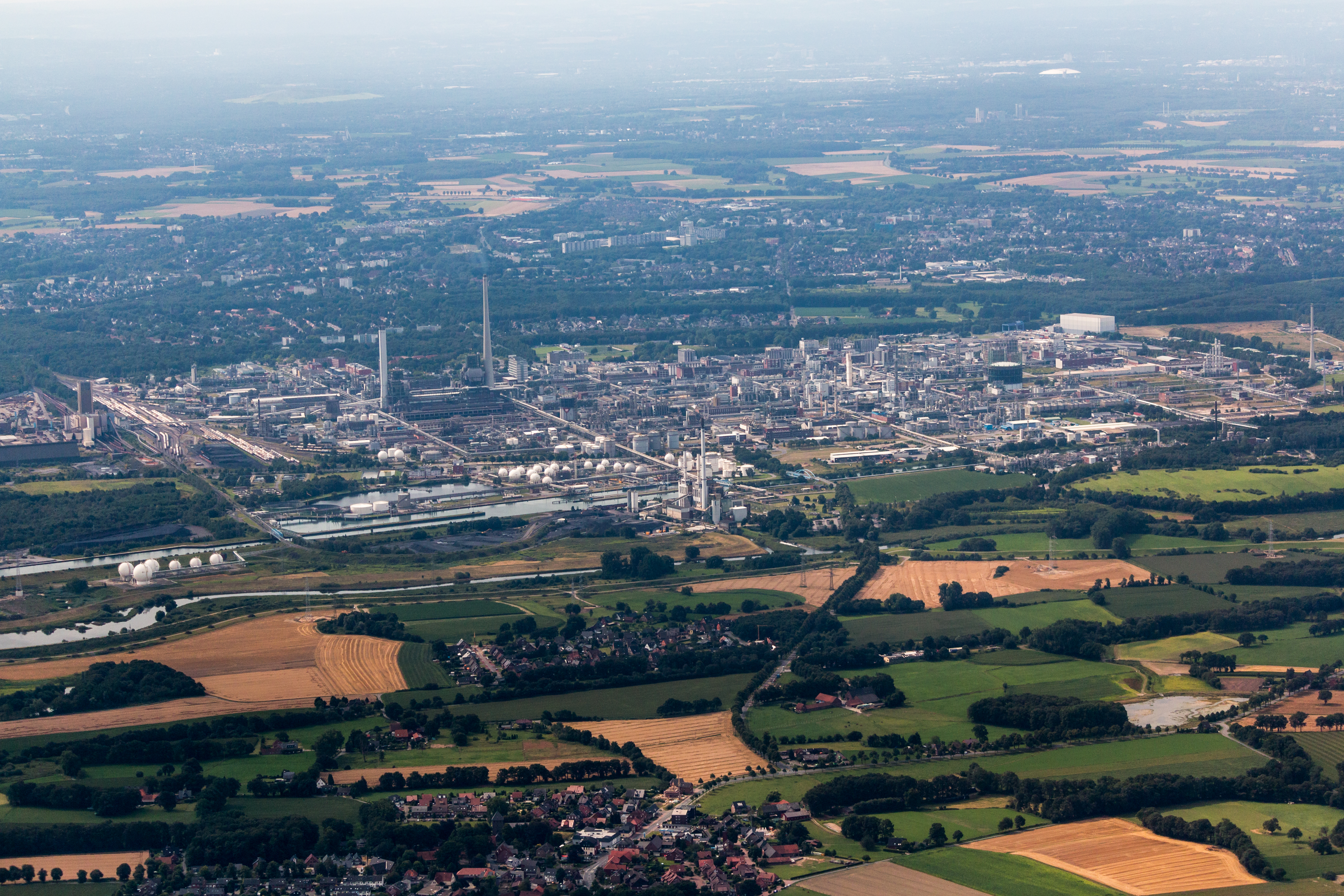
- Built: 1938
- Location: Paul-Baumann-Straße 1, 45772 Marl, Germany; Marl, North Rhine-Westphalia
- Coordinates: 51.683°N 7.097°E
- Industry: Chemical industry
- Products: Specialty chemicals Fine chemicals
- Employees: 10,000
- Buildings: 900
- Area: 650 hectares
- Owners: Infracor GmbH; Evonik Industries AG

Marl Chemical Park (German: Chemiepark Marl) is an industrial park in Marl, North Rhine-Westphalia, Germany. It is the third largest industrial cluster in Germany and among the largest chemical production facilities in Europe. The site occupies over 6 square kilometers, hosts 100 chemical plants, employs 10,000 people, and produces 4 million metric tons of chemicals annually. 18 companies are based in the Park, including primary tenant Evonik Industries AG, which also owns and operates the infrastructure through its subsidiary Infracor GmbH.

Originally named Chemische Werke Hüls, the complex was built in 1938 by a consortium led by IG Farben to produce synthetic rubber and other war materials for the Third Reich. By 1942 over 5000 workers' families had relocated into new housing which transformed Marl into a company town. At the height of World War II, the Germans also used slave laborers and prisoners of war at the plant. Allied bombing heavily damaged the site in mid-1943 although full production had resumed by 1944. Near the end of the war, employees saved the plant from complete destruction under Hitler's Nero Decree and the US Army occupied it in March, 1945.

After the war, the plant operated under restrictions imposed by the Allied Control Council and by 1953 turned over to new German owners. New products such as plastics and intermediate chemicals began to be produced. Coal-mining conglomerate RAG AG became majority owner in 2007 and created a new entity Evonik Industries, with a focus on specialty and fine chemicals. In 2009, Marl Chemical Park received its current name. In 2012 a fire halted production of cyclododecatriene (CDT) for several months. The plant manufactures a substantial proportion of the world supply of CDT, a precursor to Nylon 12, which in turn led to a shortage which impacted global production of finished goods particularly in the automotive industry.

Marl Chemical Park is an anchor point on the Ruhr Industrial Heritage Trail and can be visited.

== Location ==
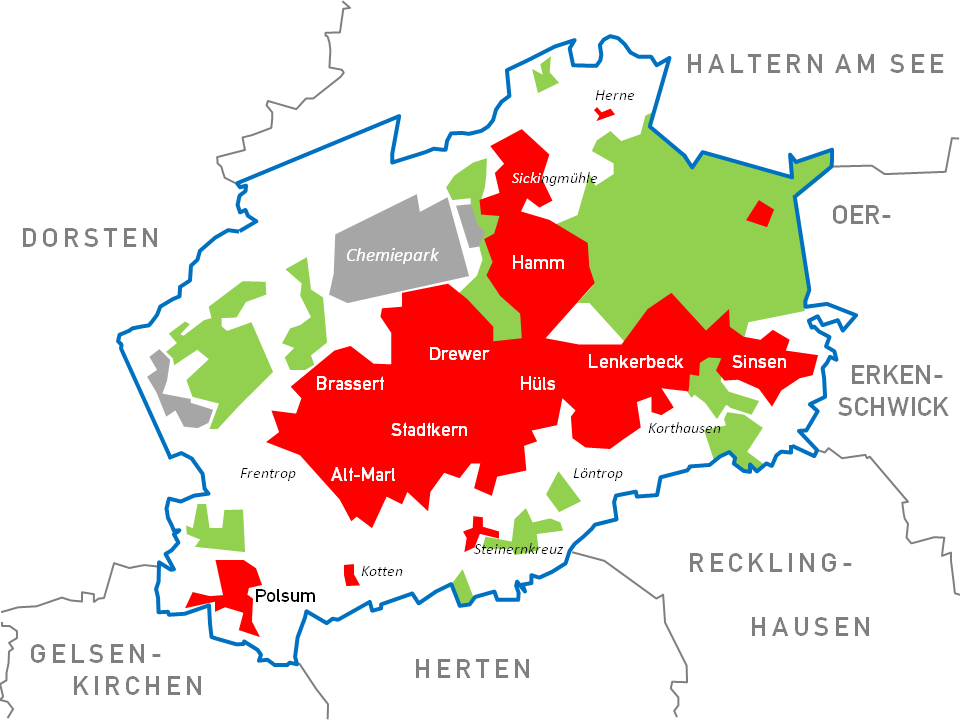
Marl Chemical Park (gray) and Marl urban districts (red) within the Marl municipality (blue outline)

Marl Chemical Park is located on the northern edge of the Ruhr area in the southern foothills of the Münster region. Both the Lippe River and Wesel-Datteln Canal run through the northern part of the site. To the south is Bundesautobahn 52 with a connection to Bundesautobahn 43. In addition to freight rail links with Deutsche Bahn, an alternative connection leads to the Gelsenkirchen-Buer Nord–Marl Lippe railway. The national Ethene Pipeline System running from Gelsenkirchen to Wilhelmshaven travels through the site, and the Rhine-Ruhr Hydrogen Pipeline is owned and operated from the site.

== Facilities ==
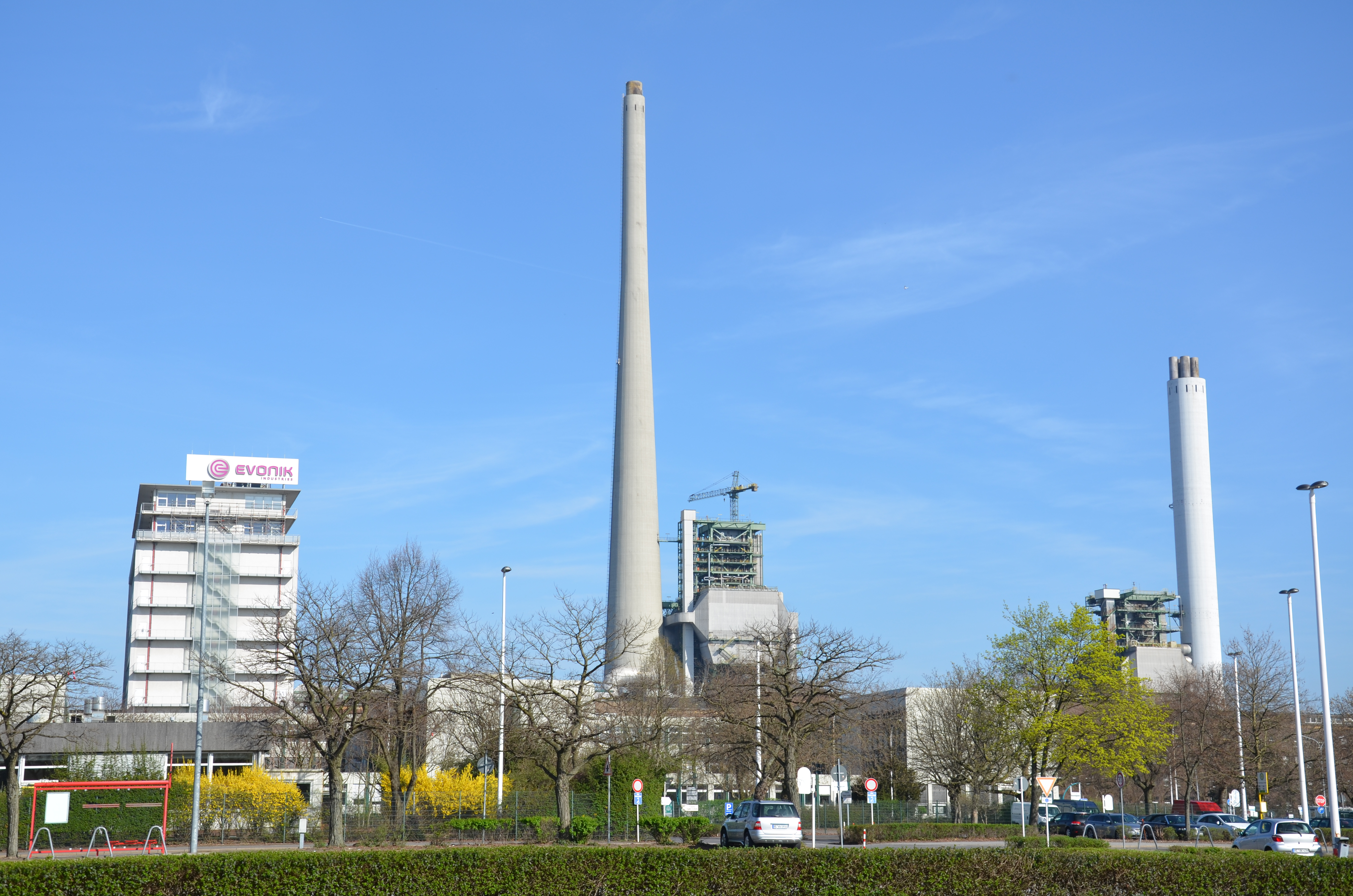
Marl energy cogeneration facility near the south gate

Including Evonik, Marl Chemical Park hosts 18 companies and 100 production plants in over 900 buildings operating through a shared infrastructure. It is the third largest integrated industrial park, known as a Verbund site, in Germany. It is also the largest filling center for hydrogen in Europe. Shared services include:

- Energy cogeneration: two gas-fired power plants and one coal-fired power station provide 300MW of electrical power in different voltages (110kV, 10kV, 6kV, 500V and 400/230V) and 1000 tons of steam per hour in various pressures (4, 20, 70 and 120 bar). In 2019 construction began on a replacement of the coal station with a new 180MW natural gas facility, to be opened in 2022.
- Street grid: 55 km long and numbered east–west (100, 200, 1200) and south–north (20, 40, 60), giving buildings unique numbers that indicate their position in the facility (i.e. building 145 is near the intersection of streets 100 and 40).
- Raw materials: via pipeline, rail, truck and ship, such as ethylene, propene, C4 hydrocarbons, benzene, methanol, brine and natural gas. This includes storage areas, high rack and tank storage facilities.
- Air separation plant: generates liquefied argon and other gases based on the Linde process.
- Internal pipeline network: 1200 km long on 30 km of pipeline bridges transporting reaction intermediates, end products, and various gases including hydrogen, nitrogen, and oxygen.
- Industrial railway: 100 km-long and freight station with two connections to the Deutsche Bahn, in one of the largest private electronically monitored train stations in Europe.
- Wastewater system: 70 km long sewer network separated into rain/cooling and dark water channels, processed by two sewage treatment plants before reaching the Lippe River. On the north end of the site is a sludge incineration plant.
- Fire department: handling hazardous materials, industrial fires and other emergencies.

== History ==
=== Construction ===
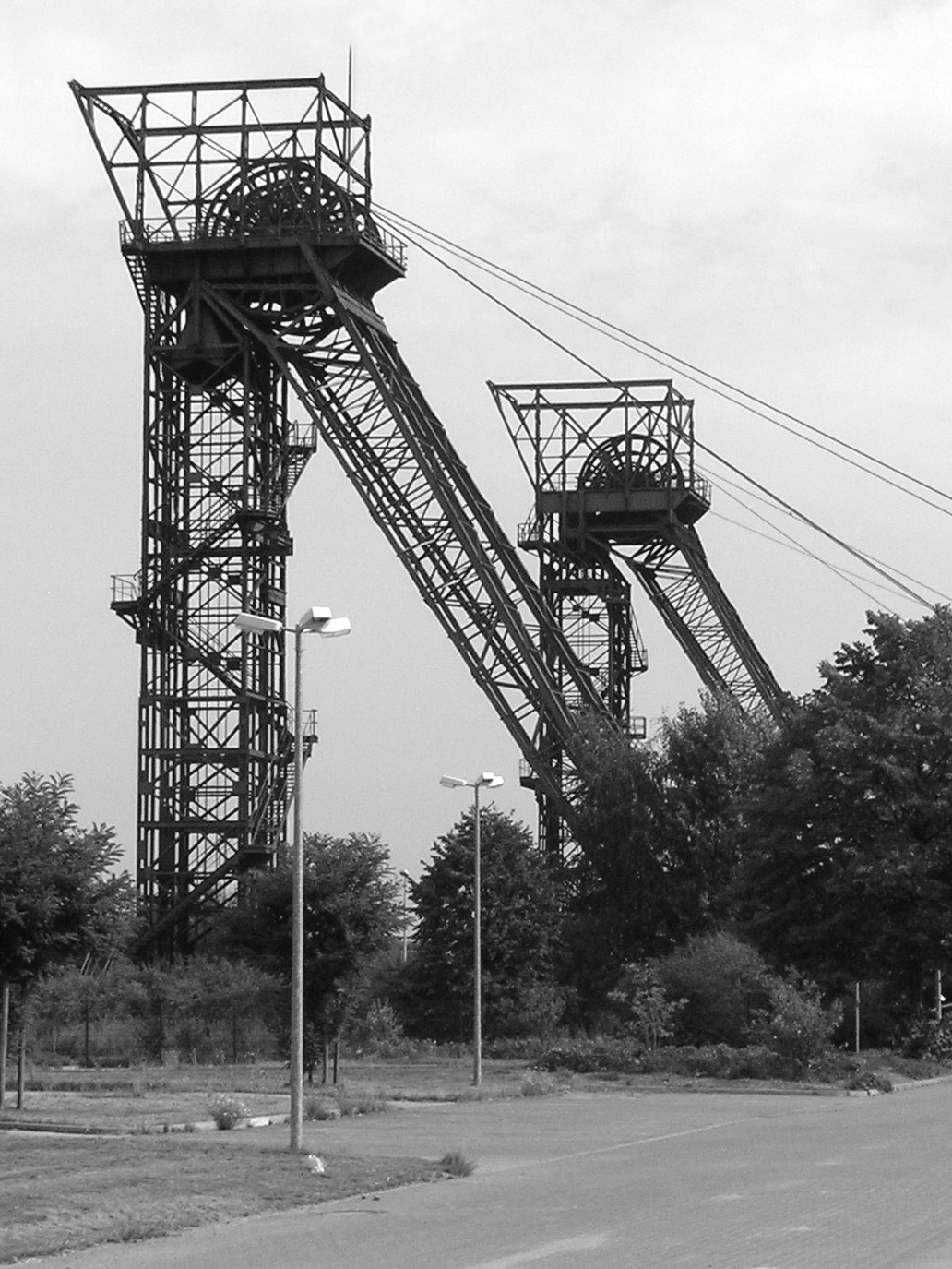
Headframe of the August-Victoria mine, which supplied the coal used to create raw materials for the plant

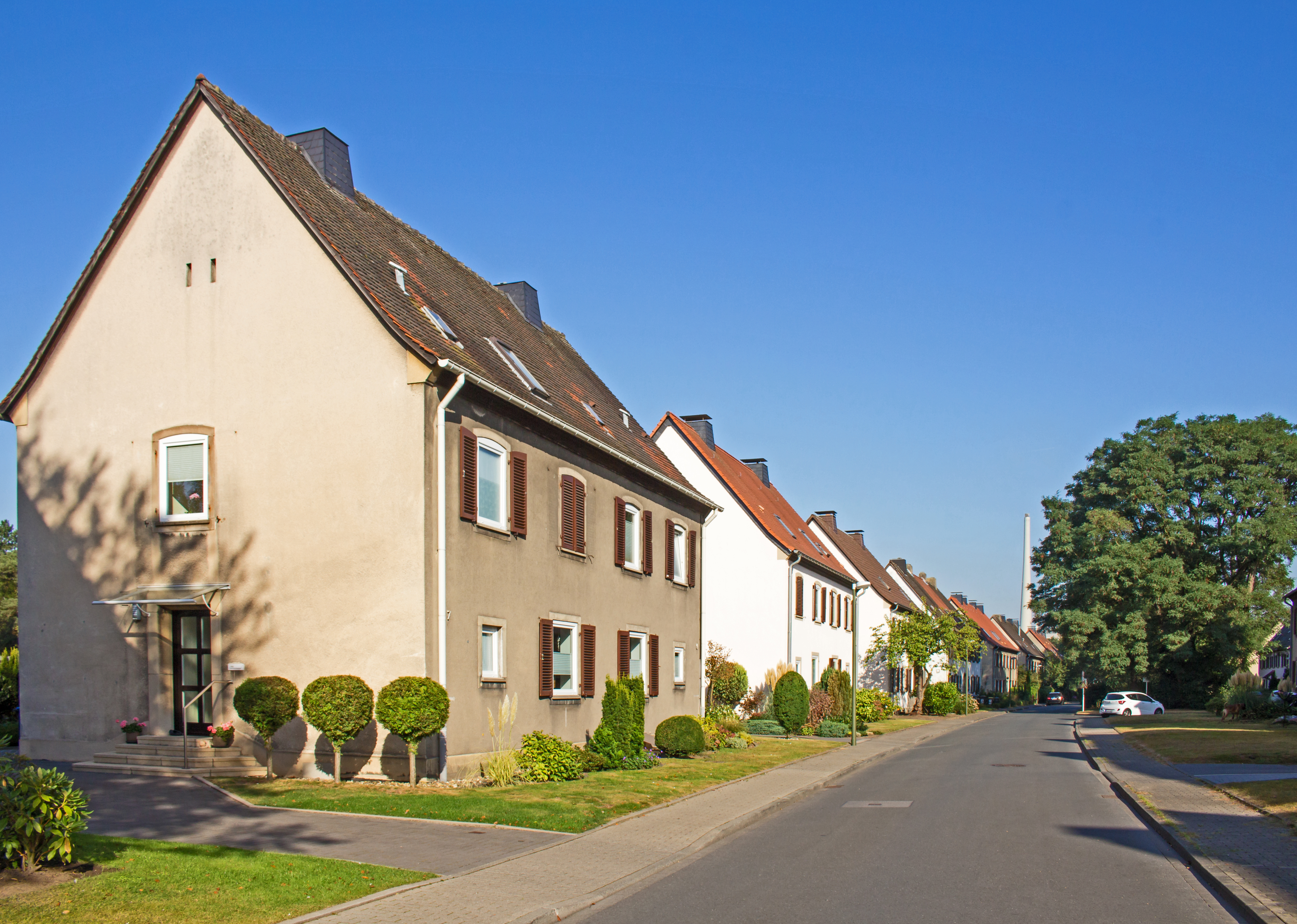
Bereitsschaftssiedlung shift supervisor's housing on Hiberniastraße, built by IG Farben 1938–42, with the plant in the background

In 1936, the Nazi government launched a Four Year Plan which identified strategic materials critical to German rearmament, with a goal to make Germany self-sufficient in preparation for war. Replacing natural rubber with synthetic rubber in the manufacture of tires and continuous track for the Wehrmacht became a priority. The solution was Buna-S, a polymer derived from coal, initially developed by Bayer in 1928 and first manufactured commercially by parent company IG Farben in 1937. Prior to World War II Germany had become the world leader in the development of synthetic rubber technology.

To build a plant needed for mass production of Buna-S, a new company Chemische Werke Hüls GmbH was created as a joint venture between majority owner IG Farben and coal-mining company Hibernia AG, a subsidiary of Prussian state-owned holding company VEBA AG. The plant would use a new electric arc manufacturing method developed in a research alliance with American company Standard Oil of New Jersey in 1935. IG Farben provided patents to the joint venture free of charge, and in return the joint venture was to provide IG Farben all new developments in the technology and proceeds of future sales.

The factory site, adjacent to the August-Victoria coal mine at Hüls near the village of Marl, was strategically located on the northern edge of the Ruhr industrial basin along the Wesel-Datteln Canal. The Hibernia coking and hydrogenation plants in Scholven, recently completed in 1936, were to the southwest. This created a highly efficient production cycle wherein exhaust gases from Hibernia were piped to Hüls, which were converted into acetylene and ethylene using the electric arc process. Acetylene was then used to make butadiene into buna, while ethylene was processed via ethylene oxide into antifreeze and other products. The excess hydrogen produced was returned to Hibernia to make synthetic gasoline from coal liquefaction. The Hüls factory complex was inaugurated on May 9, 1938.

Managers and foremen were relocated to Marl exclusively from other IG Farben plants across Germany, such as Ludwigshafen am Rhein, Schkopau and Leverkusen, while skilled workers came from the surrounding Münster area. Housing became critical and workers lived in temporary camps as new homes were built south of the plant. The neighborhood, known as the Bereitsschaftssiedlung (literally "standby settlement"), was built by IG Farben architect Clemens Anders in the traditionalist Stuttgart school style favored in the Third Reich. From 1938 to 1942, more than 5,000 employees and their families moved in, transforming Marl into a company town. A Feierabendhaus (social center) was built in 1940 with a company restaurant, cinema, theater, and training school for National Socialist concepts. Robert Ley, director of the German Labor Front, laid the foundation stone.

=== World War II ===
At the outbreak of war, the plant was still being fitted for full production and the first commercial buna bales were delivered on August 29, 1940. By 1942 the plant was producing 50,000 tons of Buna-S annually along with chlorine, solvents, softening agents, resins and other chemicals needed for the war effort. In addition to the 5000 German employees, between 10,000 and 15,000 prisoners of war and forced laborers were locked up in 30 camps around Marl to provide workers for the plant and mines which supplied it. Records from 1944 show a special prison camp on the company site controlled by the Gestapo, and Polish workers transferred between Hüls and the Buna plant at Auschwitz.

The effects of war reached Hüls in mid-1943. Raw materials had become increasingly difficult to obtain and the plants were targeted by allied bombing. On June 11, a heavy daylight raid dropped 1,560 bombs which killed 186 people and wounded 752. Another raid by the USAAF 100th bomber group was carried out on June 22 from 25,000 ft. The site was attacked again in daylight by 235 bombers from the USAAF on June 25, with 16 bombers lost. These raids halted all production for three months. More heavy bombing targeted the Hibernia hydrogenation plants to stop the flow of raw materials, however the Hüls works managed to reach maximum output again by 1944.

On March 29, 1945, a German Army special unit appeared with orders under Hitler's Nero Decree to destroy everything in Hüls. Plant employees and particularly plant director Paul Baumann persuaded the unit to disobey the orders and protect the plant until the arrival of the Americans. The United States 8th Armored Division occupied the factories on March 31, 1945. At the end of the war, the worker population had dropped from over 10,000 to about 500.

=== Postwar ===
Immediately after the war, the site was placed under British administration. On the breakup of owner IG Farben, the Allies initially placed tight limits on what could be produced and had plans to dismantle the plant, although rubber shortages in Europe soon meant that great efforts were made to restart buna production. By 1949, the company recognized their existing synthetic rubber production methods were not competitive in world markets and American development aid became critical in re-establishing the plant's former importance. In 1953, the works were released from Allied control and ownership converted into a stock corporation. The complex was named Chemische Werke Hüls AG and began manufacturing plastics, raw materials for detergents and a new synthetic rubber process developed by the Americans.

During the Wirtschaftswunder, the chemical works were continuously redeveloped with new product lines under the management of VEBA AG. In 1985, the company began trading under the name Hüls AG and had moved away from basic industries towards more complex chemicals. Hüls AG and Degussa AG merged in 1999 to form Degussa-Hüls, and in 2001 Degussa-Hüls and SKW Trostberg AG merged to form the new Degussa AG, the third largest chemical group in Germany.

=== Recent ===
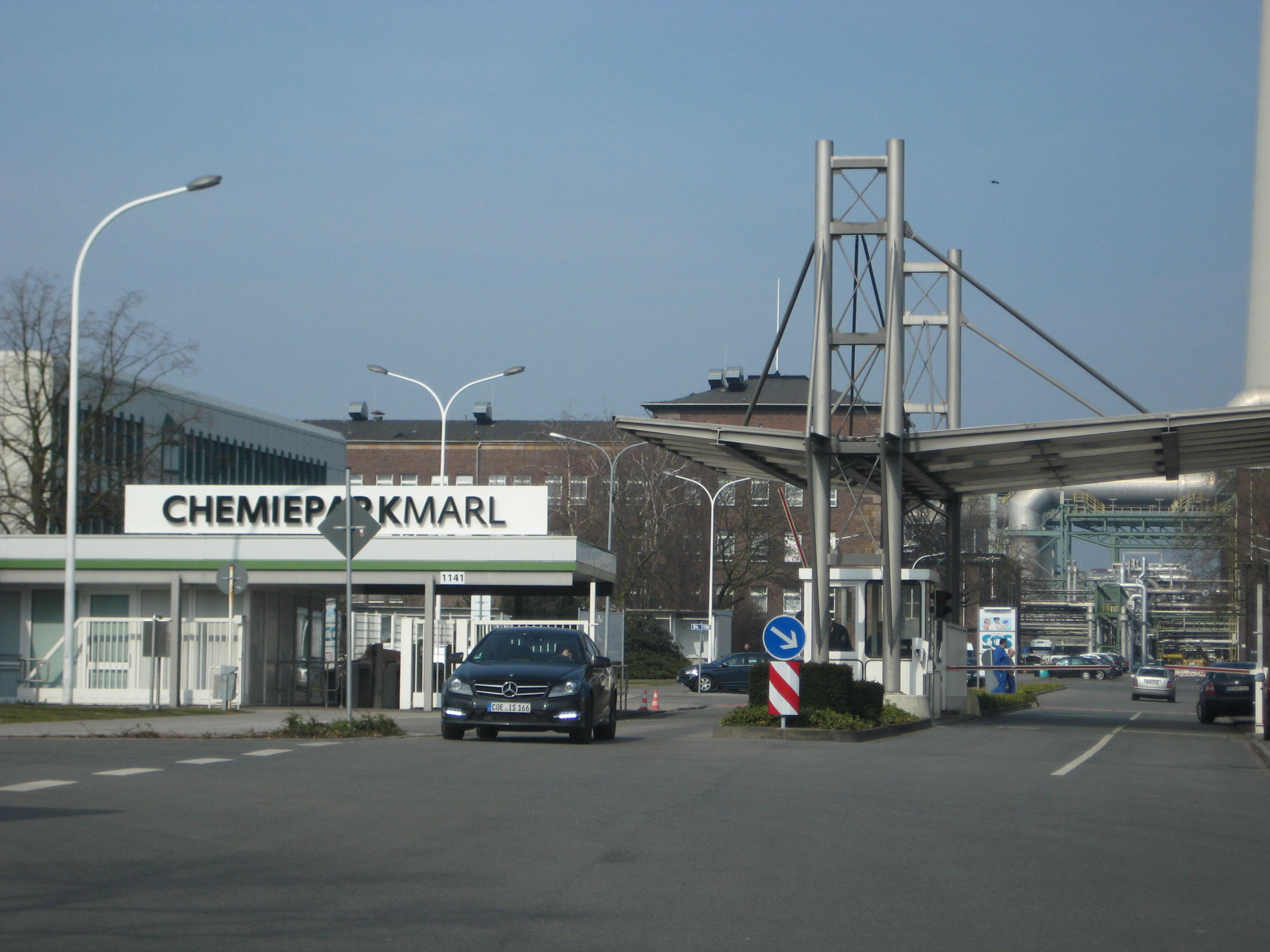
Front gate with the Evonik logo

In 2006, Essen-based coal mining conglomerate RAG AG took a controlling interest in the plant. The chemicals, energy and real estate business of RAG were then combined to form a new industrial group Evonik Industries. In 2009, Evonik repositioned itself entirely into specialty chemicals and became owner/operator of the newly named Marl Chemical Park through its subsidiarity Infracor GmbH. Today, in addition to Evonik and its affiliates, 17 other companies are based in the Park.

== Resident companies ==
- Evonik Industries and subsidiaries:
  - Nutrition & Care
  - Performance Materials
  - Ressource Efficiency
  - Materials
  - Creavis
  - Technology and Infrastructure
  - Logistics Service
  - Catering Services
  - Operations
  - Real Estate
  - CPM Netz
  - TÜV Nord InfraChem
  - Umschlag Terminal Marl
  - Westgas

Companies independent of Evonik

- Air Liquide GmbH
- Air Products GmbH
- Alba Group plc & Co. KG
- C+S Chlorgas GmbH
- Dow Deutschland Anlagengesellschaft mbH
- Eastman Chemical Company HTF GmbH
- Goodman Germany GmbH
- Ineos Solvents Marl GmbH
- Ineos Styrenics GmbH (before 2005 part of BP)
- Karl Schmidt Spedition GmbH & Co. KG
- Linde plc
- Metro Logistics Germany
- Natural Energy West GmbH
- OQ Chemicals GmbH & Co. KG
- Sasol Germany GmbH
- Synthomer Deutschland GmbH
- Vestolit GmbH

== Products ==
Marls Chemical Park produces 4 million metric tons of chemicals annually. More than 4,000 chemical products are manufactured, the largest quantities being:

- Acetylene, acrylic acid, alkanolamines, alkylphenols
- Benzene, butadiene, butane, butanediol, butanol, butene, butyl acetates, butyl acrylate, butyl chloride, butyraldehyde
- Chlorine, copolyamides, copolyesters, cumene
- Dichlorobutane, dichloroethane
- Ethoxylate, ethylbenzene, ethyl chloride, ethylene, ethylene glycol, ethylene oxide, 2-ethylhexanol
- Formaldehyde
- Glycols
- Resins
- Isobutene
- Latex
- MAC/MAS, methanol, methyl chloride, MTBE
- Sodium hydroxide
- Polyamides, polyesters, polyethylene glycols, polyoctenamer, polystyrene, propylene, PVC
- Hydrochloric acid, sulfuric acid, styrene
- Surfactants, tetrahydrofuran
- Plasticizers

== Emergency management ==
The chemical industry in Germany and Austria jointly maintain the Transport-Unfall-Informations- und Hilfeleistungssystem, acronym TUIS (English: Transport Accident Information and Assistance System). Experts can be reached by phone around the clock to provide information on how to handle chemicals in the event of a transport accident. The Marl Chemical Park fire brigade is one of the ten nationwide TUIS emergency call centers and also provides vehicles and equipment.

== Accidents ==
- January 30, 1995: After a previous safety shutdown, a connecting elbow in a reactor at the ethanolamine factory tore off when starting up and about two tons of ammonia and 400 kg of ethanolamine leaked. Since this accident happened after the day shift, only property damage occurred. The release of the substances is registered as ZEMA event 9501.
- July 19, 1998: Operator error in the vinyl chloride plant triggered an unexpected exothermic reaction. This led to the bursting of pipes, escape of hydrogen chloride and an open fire. The fire brigade was able to protect neighboring systems with cooling, suppress the hydrogen chloride with spray mist and let escaping gases burn off in a controlled manner. There was considerable property damage. The release of the substance is recorded by ZEMA as event 9815.
- May 28, 1999: A pipe bend in a vinyl chloride plant tore open and a mixture of 1,2-dichloroethane, vinyl chloride and hydrogen chloride leaked out. Six employees were injured, some emergency services also suffered minor injuries. No people were affected outside the Chemical Park. Because of the release of the substances, this was a reportable accident registered as ZEMA event 9918.
- October 10, 2006: At around 10:40am there was a deflagration in a production building of the intermediate product factory. As a result, the Marlotherm with which products are heated up to approximately 300 °C ignited. As a result of the oil fire, a huge black column of smoke rose into the sky clearly visible even in the neighboring towns. After a few hours, the plant fire brigade was able to put out the fire. This incident is recorded by ZEMA as event 0621.
- 2012 cyclododecatriene plant fire: On March 31, 2012, at around 1:35 p.m. there was damage to the cyclododecatriene (CDT) system of the Evonik company, which was accompanied by a 100-meter-high jet flame and heavy smoke. Residents reported a severe explosion and a cloud of smoke moved south over the A 2. One worker died at the scene of the accident, another died from serious injuries later in hospital. Measurements by the fire brigade showed no health risk for the population. According to initial investigations, material fatigue is assumed to be the cause. The damage stopped production of cyclododecatriene (CDT) for several months. The plant produced a substantial proportion of the world's production of CDT, particularly that needed to produce laurolactam, a precursor to the polyamide Nylon 12. This shortage in turn led to concerns for global production of finished goods, particularly in the automotive industry. Other biobased polyamides, not dependent on laurolactam or CDT, have been put forward as possible alternative materials.
