= C12H22O4 =

The molecular formula C_{12}H_{22}O_{4} (molar mass: 230.30 g/mol, exact mass: 230.1518 u) may refer to:

- Dodecanedioic acid (DDDA)
- 1,6-Hexanediol diglycidyl ether
