= Autoxidation =

Spontaneous oxidation by oxygen at normal temperature

Autoxidation (sometimes auto-oxidation) refers to oxidations brought about by reactions with oxygen at normal temperatures, without the intervention of flame or electric spark. The term is usually used to describe the gradual degradation of organic compounds in air at ambient temperatures. Many common phenomena can be attributed to autoxidation, such as food going rancid, the 'drying' of varnishes and paints, and the perishing of rubber. It is also an important concept in both industrial chemistry and biology. Autoxidation is therefore a fairly broad term and can encompass examples of photooxygenation and catalytic oxidation.

The common mechanism is a free radical chain reaction, where the addition of oxygen gives rise to hydroperoxides and their associated peroxy radicals (ROO•). Typically, an induction period is seen at the start where there is little activity; this is followed by a gradually accelerating take-up of oxygen, giving an autocatalytic reaction which can only be kept in check by the use of antioxidants. Unsaturated compounds are the most strongly affected but many organic materials will oxidise in this way given time.

Although autoxidation is usually undesirable, it has been exploited in chemical synthesis. In these cases the term 'autoxidation' is often used more broadly to include spontaneous reactions with oxygen at elevated temperatures, such as in the Cumene process.

== Mechanism ==
The free radical chain reaction is sometimes referred to as the Bolland-Gee mechanism or the basic autoxidation scheme (BAS) and was originally based on the oxidation of rubbers, but remains generally accurate for many materials. It can be divided into three stages: initiation, propagation, and termination. The initiation step is often ill-defined and many agents have been proposed as radical initiators. The autoxidation of unsaturated compounds may be initiated by reactions with singlet oxygen or environmental pollutants such as ozone and NO_{2}. Saturated polymers, such as polyolefins would be expected to resist autoxidation, however in practise they contain hydroperoxides formed by thermal oxidation during their high temperature moulding and casting, which can act as initiators. In biological systems reactive oxygen species are important. For industrial reactions a radical initiator, such as benzoyl peroxide, will be intentionally added.

All of these processes lead to the generation of carbon centred radicals on the polymer chain (R•), typically by abstraction of H from labile C-H bonds. Once the carbon-centred radical has formed, it reacts rapidly with O_{2} to give a peroxy radical (ROO•). This in turn abstracts an H atom from a weak C-H bond give a hydroperoxide (ROOH) and a fresh carbon-centred radical. The hydroperoxides can then undergo a number of possible homolytic reactions to generate more radicals, giving an accelerating reaction. As the concentration of radicals increases chain termination reactions become more important, these reduce the number of radicals by radical disproportionation or combination, leading to a sigmoid reaction plot.

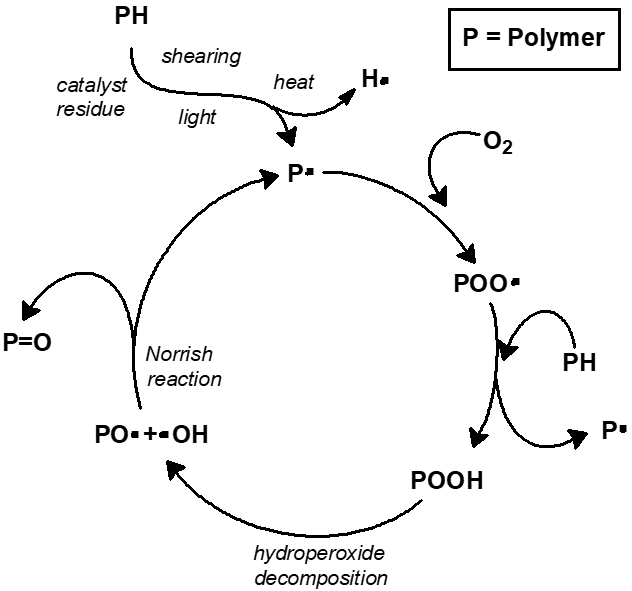
The cyclic mechanism of autoxidation

Chain initiation

$$\ce{Polymer -> P\bullet +\  P\bullet}$$

Chain propagation

$$\ce{P\bullet +\ O2 -> POO\bullet}$$
$$\ce{POO\bullet +\ PH -> {POOH} +\ P\bullet}$$

Chain branching

$$\ce{POOH -> PO\bullet +\  OH\bullet}$$
$$\ce{{PH} + OH\bullet -> P\bullet +\ H2O}$$
$$\ce{PO\bullet -> Chain\ scission\ reactions}$$

Termination

$$\ce{POO\bullet +\ POO\bullet -> cross\ linking\ reaction\ to\ non-radical\ product}$$
$$\ce{POO\bullet +\ P\bullet -> cross\ linking\ reaction\ to\ non-radical\ product}$$
$$\ce{P\bullet +\ P\bullet -> cross\ linking\ reaction\ to\ non-radical\ product}$$

== In oils and polymers ==
The autoxidation of unsaturated fatty acids causes them to crosslink to form polymers. This phenomenon has been known since antiquity and forms the basis of drying oils, which were traditionally used to make many varnishes and paints. Linseed oil, which is rich in polyunsaturated fats, is a prime example.

Conversely, autoxidation can also cause polymers such as plastics to deteriorate. Sensitivity varies depending in the polymer backbone, in general structures containing unsaturated groups, allylic and benzylic C−H bonds and tertiary carbon centres are more susceptible, rubbers are therefore particularly sensitive. Autoxidation can be inhibited by a wide range of polymer stabilizers, or accelerated by biodegradable additives. Similarly, antioxidant oil additives and fuel additives are used to inhibit autoxidation.

== In food ==
The prevention of autoxidation is important in the food and drink industry and is achieved both by both chemical preservatives and a range of oxygen excluding food preservation techniques such as canning. It is well known that fats, especially polyunsaturated fats, become rancid, even when kept at low temperatures, however many other foods are susceptible to autoxidation. The complex mixture of compounds found in wine, including polyphenols, polysaccharides, and proteins, can undergo autoxidation during the aging process, leading to wine faults. The browning of many foods, such as skinned apples, can be considered an autoxidation process, although it is generally an enzymatic process such as lipid peroxidation which proceeds via a different mechanism to the one shown above.

== In industry ==
In the chemical industry, many organic chemicals are produced by autoxidation:

- in the cumene process, isopropylbenzene undergoes autoxidation to give cumene hydroperoxide. This compound is then converted to phenol and acetone, both commodity chemicals. are made from benzene and propylene. Many variations of this reaction have been developed, e.g. use of diisopropylbenzene as a substrate.
- the autoxidation of cyclohexane yields cyclohexanol and cyclohexanone.
- p-xylene undergoes auoxidation to terephthalic acid.
- ethylbenzene is oxidized to ethylbenzene hydroperoxide, an epoxidizing agent in the propylene oxide/styrene process POSM

In the Bashkirov process, the autoxidation is conducted in the presence of boric acid, yielding an intermediate borate ester. The process is more selective with the boric acid, but the conversion to the alcohol requires hydrolysis of the ester. This approach continues to be used in the production of cyclododecanol from cyclododecane. Cyclododecanol is a precursor to cyclododecanone, which is used to make nylon-12.

== See also ==
- Photodegradation - this often involves autoxidation processes which are accelerated by UV energy
