= Cyclododecatriene =

trans,trans,cis-1,5,9-Cyclododecatriene

Names
- Preferred IUPAC name (1Z,5E,9E)-Cyclododeca-1,5,9-triene

Identifiers
CAS Number	706-31-0 (trans,trans,cis-1,5,9); 676-22-2 (trans,trans,trans-1,5,9); 4904-61-4 (1,5,9; unspecified stereochem)
3D model (JSmol)	Interactive image
Abbreviations	CDT; 1,5,9-CDT
ChemSpider	4865846 (trans,trans,cis-1,5,9)
ECHA InfoCard	100.023.212
PubChem CID	6262774 (trans,trans,cis-1,5,9)
UNII	7K92XVU2C2 (trans,trans,cis-1,5,9); PG450K437C (trans,trans,trans-1,5,9); 6Q5S1IRJ4Q (1,5,9; unspecified stereochem)
CompTox Dashboard (EPA)	DTXSID8027581
- InChI: InChI=1S/C12H18/c1-2-4-6-8-10-12-11-9-7-5-3-1/h1-2,7-10H,3-6,11-12H2/b2-1-,9-7+,10-8+ Key: ZOLLIQAKMYWTBR-RYMQXAEESA-N; (trans,trans,cis-1,5,9): InChI=1/C12H18/c1-2-4-6-8-10-12-11-9-7-5-3-1/h1-2,7-10H,3-6,11-12H2/b2-1-,9-7+,10-8+ Key: ZOLLIQAKMYWTBR-RYMQXAEEBC
- SMILES: C1C\C=C\CC\C=C/CC\C=C\1

Properties
Chemical formula	C_{12}H_{18}
Molar mass	162.276 g·mol^{−1}
Appearance	Colorless liquid
Density	0.89 g/mL
Melting point	−18 °C (0 °F; 255 K)
Boiling point	231 °C (448 °F; 504 K)
- Except where otherwise noted, data are given for materials in their standard state (at 25 °C [77 °F], 100 kPa). Infobox references

Cyclododecatrienes are cyclic trienes with the formula C_{12}H_{18}. Four isomers are known for 1,5,9-cyclododecatriene. The trans,trans,cis-isomer is a precursor in the production of nylon-12.

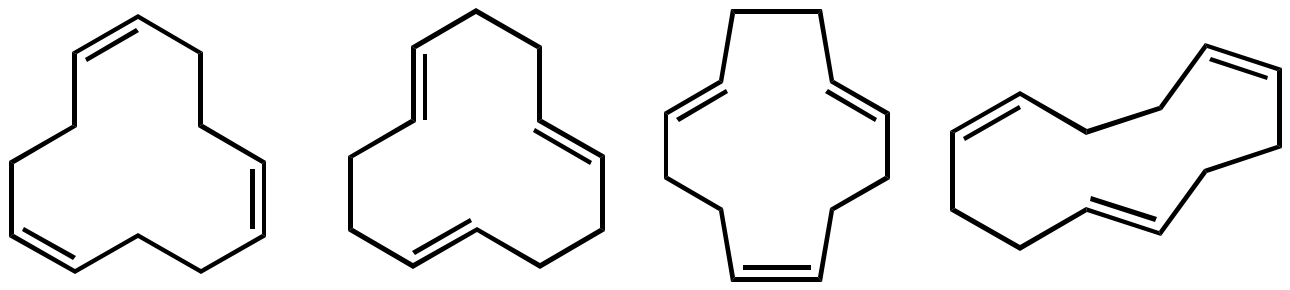
The four isomers of 1,5,9-cyclododecatriene. Left to right: all-cis; all-trans; cis,trans,trans; and cis,cis,trans

== Production ==
The trans,trans,cis-isomer is obtained by cyclotrimerization of butadiene catalyzed by a mixture of titanium tetrachloride and an organoaluminium co-catalyst. Production capacity in 1995 was 8000 tons.

Route to cis,trans,trans-CDT from butadiene

As aforementioned, titanium catalysts predominantly produce the important cis,trans,trans- isomer. The all-trans isomer is, however, the product from nickel- and chromium-catalyzed trimerization reactions. The yield of cyclododecatriene through these methods is often greater than 80%. The principal side products are the dimers and oligomers of butadiene.

== Properties ==
All of the isomers of 1,5,9-cyclododecatriene are colorless, possess typical terpene-like odors, and have low melting points. The all-trans isomer melts at 34 °C while the other three isomers melt below room temperature. All of the isomers behave like typical olefins. The all-trans and cis,trans,trans isomers in particular tend to form complexes with transition metals. They also undergo transannular reactions and isomerization.

== Applications ==
Cyclododecatriene is the raw material for the production of dodecanedioic acid (4) through hydrogenation to cyclododecane (2) followed by air oxidation in the presence of boric acid at elevated temperatures to a mixture of the alcohol (3a) and the ketone (3b). In the final step this mixture oxidized further by nitric acid:

The alcohol (3a) and the ketone (3b) can be purified from the alcohol/ketone mixture under different reaction conditions. Pure cyclododecanol (3a) can be produced from the hydrogenation of the mixture in the presence of a copper-chromium catalyst at 30 MPa and 160 °C. Pure cyclododecanone (3b) can be produced through the dehydrogenation of the mixture over copper or copper-chromium catalysts on an active support at a temperature range of 230–245 °C and atmospheric pressure. Pure cyclododecanone can then be converted into cyclododecanone oxime, which yields laurolactam after Beckmann rearrangement. Laurolactam is the precursor to several plastics, such as polyamide 12, which is also known as nylon 12.

Cyclododecatriene (in its usual trans,trans,cis-isomer) has also been used to produce the flame retardant hexabromocyclododecane (HBCDD). This use is being curtailed due to environmental concerns.

Al-trans CDT is a precursor to a promising woody fragrance. The preparative route begins with epoxidation followed conversion of the epoxide to the diene-ketone.

== 2012 Evonik fire ==
In March 2012, a fire at the Marl Chemical Park operated by Evonik Industries in Marl, Germany, stopped production for an expected duration of several months. The plant produced a substantial proportion of the world's production of CDT, particularly that needed to produce laurolactam, a precursor to the polyamide PA12. This in turn led to concerns for global production of finished goods, particularly in the automotive industry. Other biobased polyamides, not dependent on laurolactam or CDT, have been put forward as alternative materials.
