= Dodecanedioic acid =

Names
- Preferred IUPAC name Dodecanedioic acid
- Systematic IUPAC name Dodecanedioic acid
- Other names DDDA DC12 1,10-Decanedicarboxylic acid Decamethylenedicarboxylic acid 1,10-dicarboxydecane

Identifiers
CAS Number	693-23-2
3D model (JSmol)	Interactive image
ChEBI	CHEBI:4676
ChemSpider	12213
ECHA InfoCard	100.010.680
KEGG	C02678
PubChem CID	12736
UNII	978YU42Q6I
CompTox Dashboard (EPA)	DTXSID3027297
- InChI: InChI=1S/C12H22O4/c13-11(14)9-7-5-3-1-2-4-6-8-10-12(15)16/h1-10H2,(H,13,14)(H,15,16) Key: TVIDDXQYHWJXFK-UHFFFAOYSA-N; InChI=1/C12H22O4/c13-11(14)9-7-5-3-1-2-4-6-8-10-12(15)16/h1-10H2,(H,13,14)(H,15,16) Key: TVIDDXQYHWJXFK-UHFFFAOYAC
- SMILES: O=C(O)CCCCCCCCCCC(=O)O

Properties
Chemical formula	C_{12}H_{22}O_{4}
Molar mass	230.304 g·mol^{−1}
Appearance	White flakes
Density	1.066 g/cm^{3}
Melting point	127–129 °C (261–264 °F; 400–402 K)
Boiling point	245 °C (473 °F; 518 K)
Solubility in water	pH dependent

Hazards
Flash point	220 °C (428 °F; 493 K)
- Except where otherwise noted, data are given for materials in their standard state (at 25 °C [77 °F], 100 kPa). verify (what is ?) Infobox references

Dodecanedioic acid (DDDA) is a dicarboxylic acid with the formula HO_{2}C(CH_{2})_{10}CO_{2}H. A white solid, the compound finds a variety of applications ranging from polymers to materials. The unbranched compound is the most commonly encountered C12 dicarboxylic acid.

== Production ==
DDDA has traditionally been produced from butadiene using a multi-step chemical process. Butadiene is first converted to cyclododecatriene through cyclotrimerization. The triene is then hydrogenated to cyclododecane. Autoxidation by air in the presence of boric acid gives a mixture of cyclodecanol and the cyclododecanone. In the final step, this mixture oxidized to the diacid using nitric acid:

An alternative route involves ozonolysis of cyclododecene.

=== Biological process ===
Paraffin wax can be converted into DDDA on a laboratory scale with a special strain of Candida tropicalis yeast in a multi-step process. Renewable plant-oil feedstocks sourced from switchgrass could also be used to produce DDDA.

== Uses ==
DDDA is used in antiseptics, top-grade coatings, painting materials, corrosion inhibitors, surfactants, and polymers. It is one of two precursors to the engineering plastic nylon 612. The once commercial nylon called Qiana was produced on scale using DDDA. DDDA ester with ethylene glycol is a synthetic musk of the macrocyclic lactones group commercially marketed as "Arova 16".

=== Medical ===
In type 2 diabetic patients DDDA demonstrated that IV infusion helps to maintain normal blood sugar and energy levels without increasing the blood glucose load in the process.
