= PA12 =

PA12, PA-12 or PA 12 may refer to:

- Pennsylvania's 12th congressional district
- Pennsylvania Route 12
  - The old Pennsylvania Route 12, the Baltimore Pike
- Piper PA-12 aircraft
- Nylon 12, a polyamide (PA) with 12 carbons in monomer unit
