= Sewage sludge =

Semi-solid material that is produced as a by-product during sewage treatment

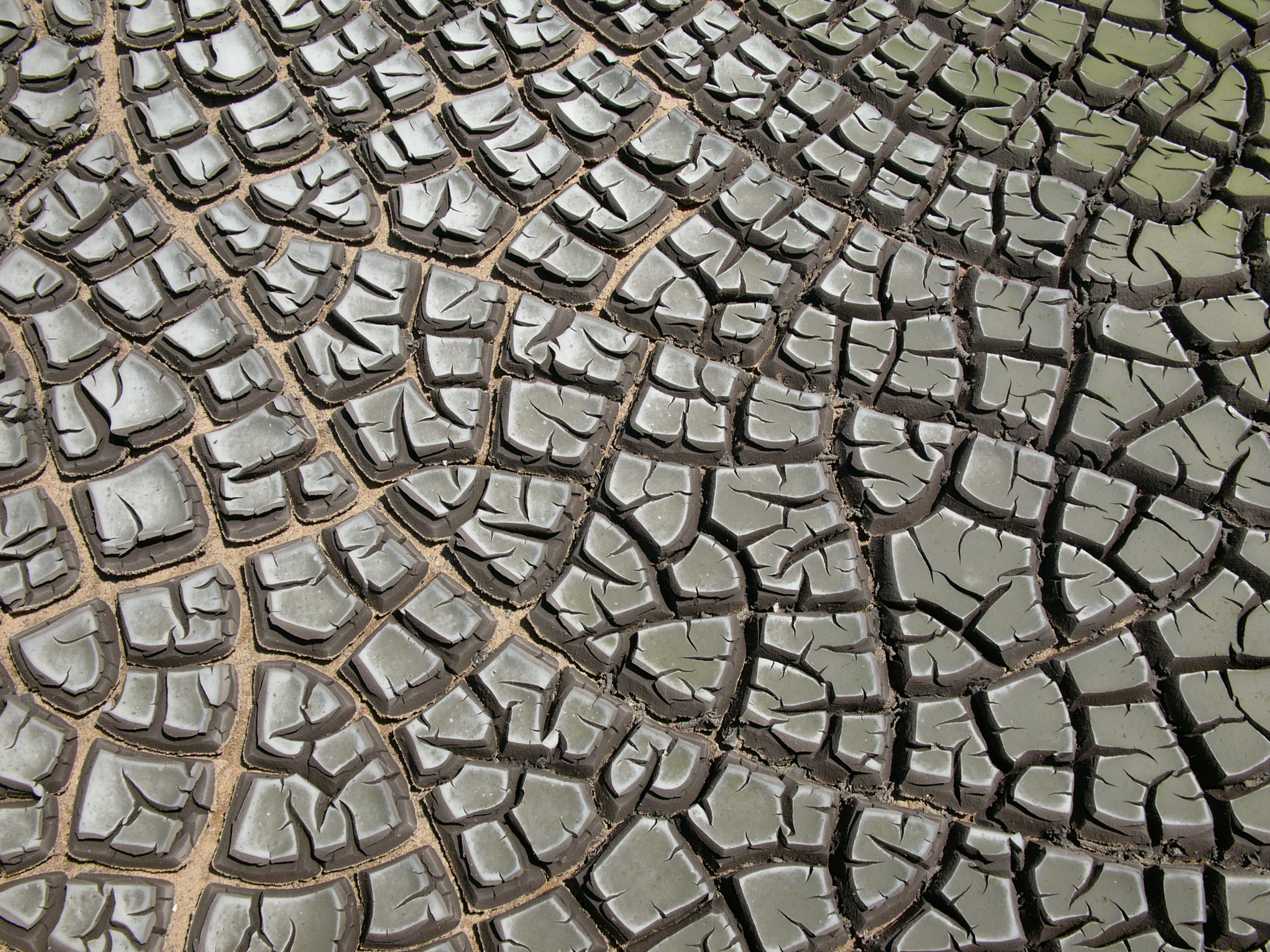
Desiccation cracks in dried sludge, the hard final remains from a sewage plant

Sewage sludge is the residual, semi-solid material that is produced as a by-product during sewage treatment of industrial or municipal wastewater. The term "septage" also refers to sludge from simple wastewater, but is connected to simple on-site sanitation systems, such as septic tanks.

After treatment, and dependent upon the quality of sludge produced (for instance, with regard to heavy metals content), sewage sludge is most commonly either disposed of in landfills, dumped in the ocean, or applied to farmland for fertilizer.

In the United States, the term "biosolids" is sometimes used as an alternative to "sewage sludge", particularly in conjunction with the re-use of sewage sludge as fertilizer after sewage sludge treatment. Biosolids can be defined as organic wastewater solids that can be reused after stabilization processes such as anaerobic digestion and composting. Opponents of sewage sludge use on farms reject this term as a euphemistic public relations term.

== Treatment process ==
Sewage sludge treatment is the process of removing contaminants from wastewater. Sewage sludge is produced from the treatment of wastewater in sewage treatment plants and consists of two basic forms — raw primary sludge and secondary sludge, also known as activated sludge in the case of the activated sludge process.

Sewage sludge is usually treated by one or several of the following treatment steps: lime stabilization, thickening, dewatering, drying, anaerobic digestion or composting. Some treatment processes, such as composting and alkaline stabilization, that involve significant amendments may affect contaminant strength and concentration: depending on the process and the contaminant in question, treatment may decrease or in some cases increase the bioavailability and/or solubility of contaminants. Regarding sludge stabilization processes, anaerobic and aerobic digestion seem to be the most common used methods in EU-27.

When fresh sewage or wastewater enters a primary settling tank, approximately 50% of the suspended solid matter will settle out in an hour and a half. This collection of solids is known as raw sludge or primary solids and is said to be "fresh" before anaerobic processes become active. The sludge will become putrescent in a short time once anaerobic bacteria take over, and must be removed from the sedimentation tank before this happens.

This is accomplished in one of two ways. Most commonly, the fresh sludge is continuously extracted from the bottom of a hopper-shaped tank by mechanical scrapers and passed to separate sludge-digestion tanks. In some treatment plants an Imhoff tank is used: sludge settles through a slot into the lower story or digestion chamber, where it is decomposed by anaerobic bacteria, resulting in liquefaction and reduced volume of the sludge.

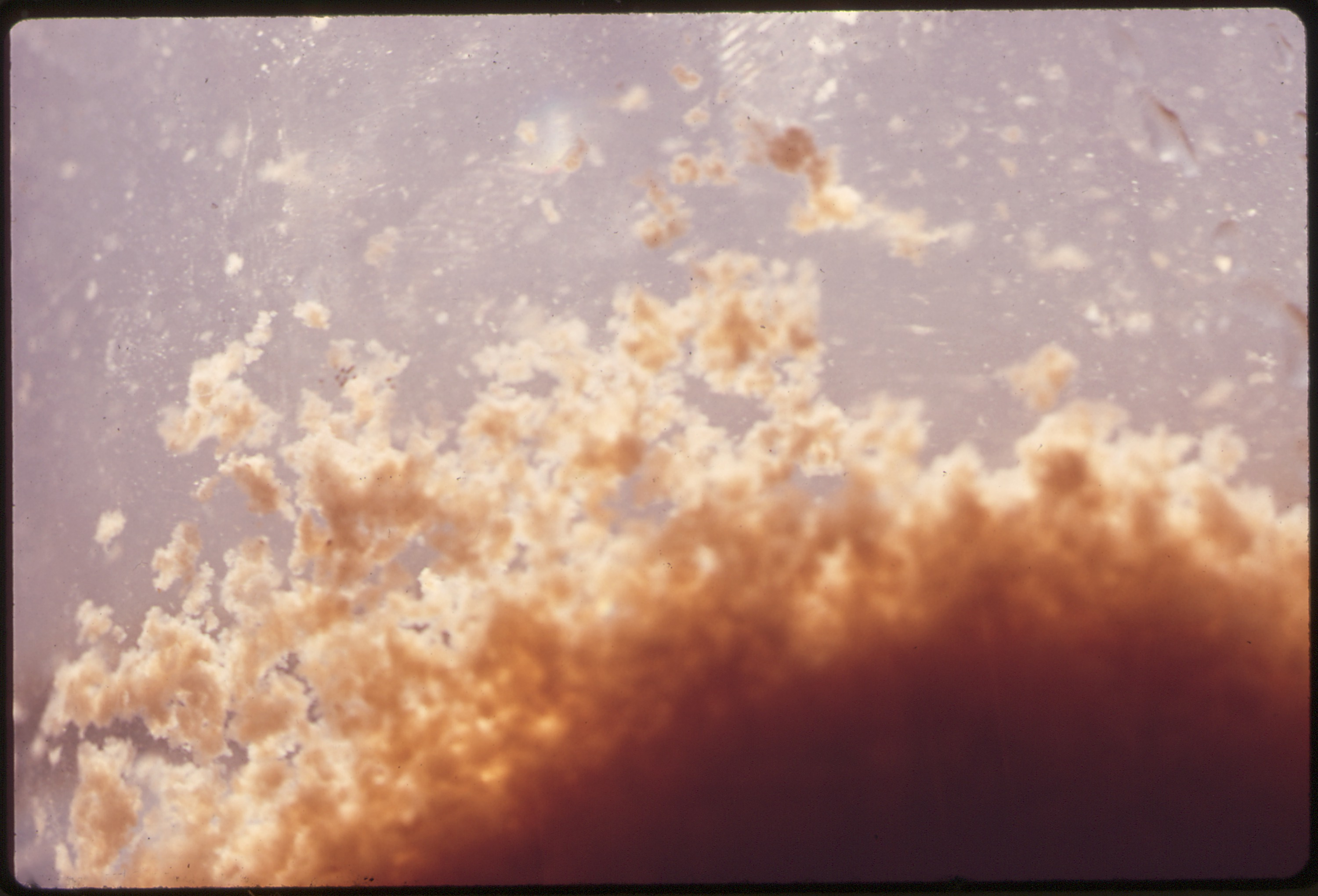
Sewage sludge in a beaker from a treatment plant

The secondary treatment process also generates a sludge largely composed of bacteria and protozoa with entrained fine solids, and this is removed by settlement in secondary settlement tanks. Both sludge streams are typically combined and are processed by anaerobic or aerobic treatment process at either elevated or ambient temperatures. After digesting for an extended period, the result is called "digested" sludge and may be disposed of by drying and then landfilling.

Following treatment, sewage sludge is either landfilled, dumped in the ocean, incinerated, applied on agricultural land or, in some cases, retailed or given away for free to the general public. According to a review article published in 2012, sludge reuse (including direct agricultural application and composting) was the predominant choice for sludge management in EU-15 (53% of produced sludge), following by incineration (21% of produced sludge). On the other hand, the most common disposal method in EU-12 countries was landfilling.

== Quantities produced ==
The amount of sewage sludge produced is proportional to the amount and concentration of wastewater treated, and it also depends on the type of wastewater treatment process used. It can be expressed as kg dry solids per cubic metre of wastewater treated. The total sludge production from a wastewater treatment process is the sum of sludge from primary settling tanks (if they are part of the process configuration) plus excess sludge from the biological treatment step. For example, primary sedimentation produces about 110–170 kg/ML of so-called primary sludge, with a value of 150 kg/ML regarded as being typical for municipal wastewater in the U.S. or Europe. The sludge production is expressed as kg of dry solids produced per ML of wastewater treated; one mega litre (ML) is 10^{3} m^{3}. Of the biological treatment processes, the activated sludge process produces about 70–100 kg/ML of waste activated sludge, and a trickling filter process produces slightly less sludge from the biological part of the process: 60–100 kg/ML. This means that the total sludge production of an activated sludge process that uses primary sedimentation tanks is in the range of 180–270 kg/ML, being the sum of primary sludge and waste activated sludge.

United States municipal wastewater treatment plants in 1997 produced about 7.7 million dry tons of sewage sludge, and about 6.8 million dry tons in 1998 according to EPA estimates. As of 2004, about 60% of all sewage sludge was applied to land as a soil amendment and fertilizer for growing crops. In a review article published in 2012, it was reported that a total amount of 10.1 million tn DS/year were produced in EU-27 countries. As of 2023, the EU produced 2 to 3 million tons of sludge each year. Worldwide it is estimated that as much as 75 Million Mg of dry sewage sludge per year.

Production of sewage sludge can be reduced by conversion from flush toilets to dry toilets such as urine-diverting dry toilets and composting toilets.

== Disposal ==
=== Landfill ===
Sewage sludge deposition in landfills can circulate human-virulent species of Cryptosporidium and Giardia pathogens. Sonication and quicklime stabilization are most effective in inactivation of these pathogens; microwave energy disintegration and top-soil stabilization were less effective.

As of 2023, 11% of sludge produced in the EU was disposed of in landfills. The EU is attempting to phase out the disposal of sludge in landfills.

=== Ocean dumping ===
It used to be common practice to dump sewage sludge into the ocean. However, this practice has stopped in many nations due to environmental concerns as well to domestic and international laws and treaties. Former USA president Ronald Reagan signed the law that prohibited ocean dumping as a means of disposal of sewage sludge in the US in 1988.

=== Incineration ===
Sludge can also be incinerated in sludge incineration plants, but incineration comes with its own set of environmental concerns (air pollution, disposal of the ash). Pyrolysis of the sludge to create syngas and potentially biochar is possible, as is combustion of biofuel produced from drying sewage sludge or incineration in a waste-to-energy facility for direct production of electricity and steam for district heating or industrial uses.

Thermal processes can greatly reduce the volume of the sludge, as well as achieve remediation of all or some of the biological concerns. Direct waste-to-energy incineration and complete combustion systems will require multi-step cleaning of the exhaust gas to ensure no hazardous substances are released. In addition, the ash produced by incineration or incomplete combustion processes (such as fluidized-bed dryers) might be difficult to use without subsequent treatment due to high heavy metal content. Solutions to this include leaching of the ashes to remove heavy metals or, in the case of ash produced in a complete-combustion process or with biochar produced from a pyrolytic process, the heavy metals may be fixed in place, and the ash material may be readily usable as a LEEDs preferred additive to concrete or asphalt. Examples of other ways to use dried sewage sludge as an energy resource include combining dried sewage sludge with coal in coal-fired power stations. In both cases this allows for production of electricity with less carbon-dioxide emissions than conventional coal-fired power stations.

As of 2023, 27% of sludge produced in the EU was incinerated.

== Use ==
=== Land application ===
Biosolids is a term widely used to denote the byproduct of domestic and commercial sewage and wastewater treatment that is to be used in agriculture. National regulations that dictate the practice of land application of treated sewage sludge differ widely and e.g. in the US there are widespread disputes about this practice.

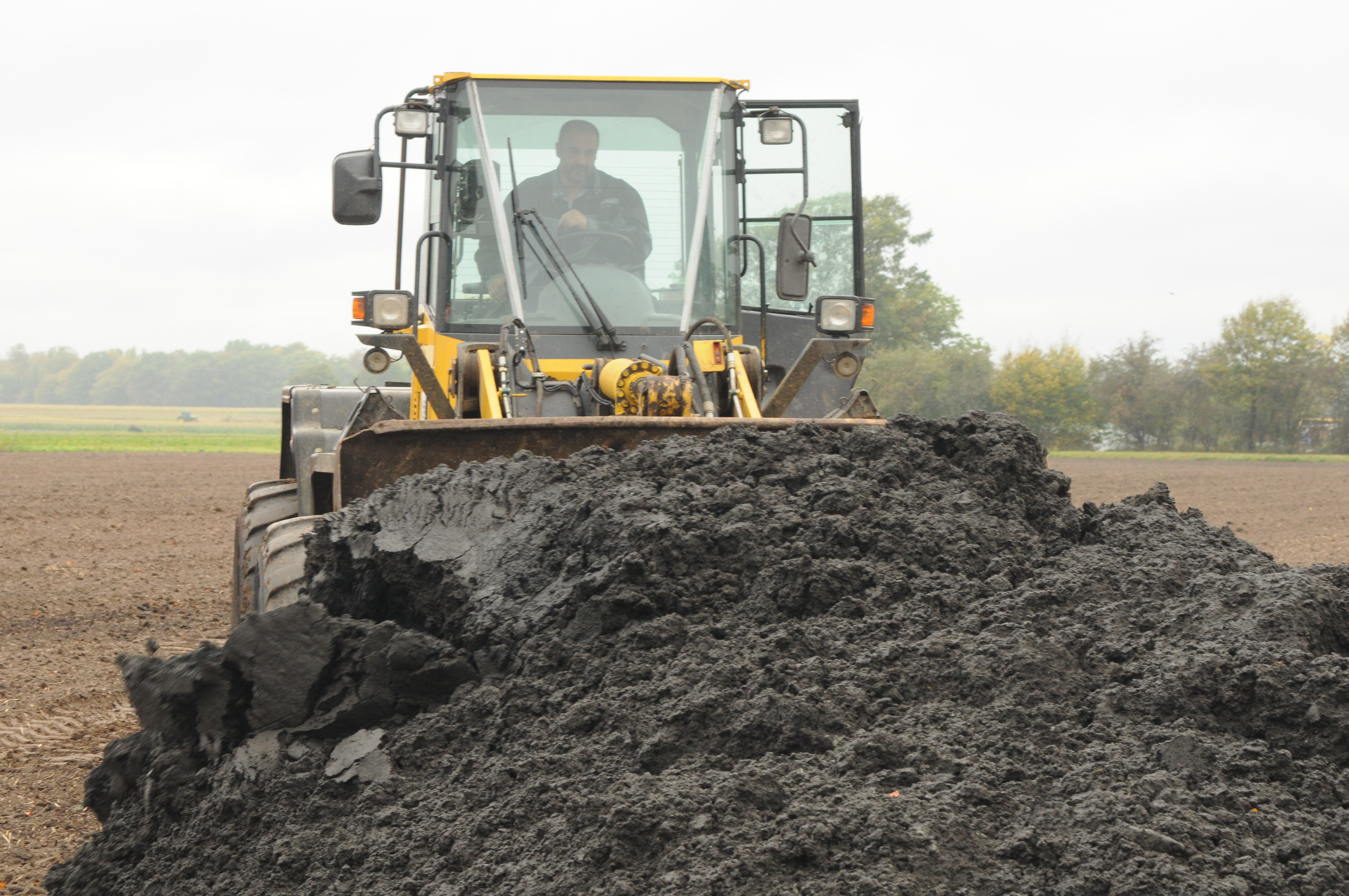
A shovel excavator loading solid sewage sludge for land application.

Depending on their level of treatment and resultant pollutant content, biosolids can be used in regulated applications for non-food agriculture, food agriculture, or distribution for unlimited use. Treated biosolids can be produced in cake, granular, pellet, or liquid form and are spread over land before being incorporated into the soil or injected directly into the soil by specialist contractors. Such use was pioneered by the production of Milorganite in 1926.

Use of sewage sludge has shown an increase in level of soil available phosphorus and soil salinity.

The findings of a 20-year field study of air, land, and water in Arizona, concluded that use of biosolids is sustainable and improves the soil and crops. Other studies report that plants uptake large quantities of heavy metals and toxic pollutants that are retained by produce, which is then consumed by humans.

A PhD thesis studying the addition of sludge to neutralize soil acidity concluded that the practice was not recommended if large amounts are used because the sludge produces acids when it oxidizes.

Studies have indicated that pharmaceuticals and personal care products, which often adsorb to sludge during wastewater treatment, can persist in agricultural soils following biosolid application. Some of these chemicals, including potential endocrine disruptor triclosan, can also travel through the soil column and leach into agricultural tile drainage at detectable levels. Other studies, however, have shown that these chemicals remain adsorbed to surface soil particles, making them more susceptible to surface erosion than infiltration. These studies are also mixed in their findings regarding the persistence of chemicals such as triclosan, triclocarban, and other pharmaceuticals. The impact of this persistence in soils is unknown, but the link to human and land animal health is likely tied to the capacity for plants to absorb and accumulate these chemicals in their consumed tissues. Studies of this kind are in early stages, but evidence of root uptake and translocation to leaves did occur for both triclosan and triclocarban in soybeans. This effect was not present in corn when tested in a different study.

A cautionary approach to land application of biosolids has been advocated by some for regions where soils have lower capacities for toxics absorption or due to the presence of unknowns in sewage biosolids. In 2007 the Northeast Regional Multi-State Research Committee (NEC 1001) issued conservative guidelines tailored to the soils and conditions typical of the northeastern US.

Use of sewage sludge is prohibited for produce to be labeled USDA-certified organic. In 2014 the United States grocery chain Whole Foods banned produce grown in sewage sludge.

Treated sewage sludge has been used in the UK, Europe and China agriculturally for more than 80 years, though there is increasing pressure in some countries to stop the practice of land application due to farm land contamination and negative public opinion. In the 1990s, there was pressure in some European countries to ban the use of sewage sludge as a fertilizer. Switzerland, Sweden, Austria, and others introduced a ban. Still, the dominant method for disposal of sewage sludge in the EU is via application to agricultural lands. As of 2023, 40% of sludge produced in the EU was used on agricultural land. Since the 1960s there has been cooperative activity with industry to reduce the inputs of persistent substances from factories. This has been very successful and, for example, the content of cadmium in sewage sludge in major European cities is now only 1% of what it was in 1970.

=== Transformation into products ===
Sewage sludge is an agglomeration of concentrated wastes, and therefore it contains many potentially extractable and useable components. These can include using sludge to produce energy, create carbon-based components, extract phosphorus and nitrogen, or make bricks or other construction materials.

Recycling of phosphate is regarded as especially important because the phosphate industry predicts that at the current rate of extraction the economic reserves will be exhausted in 100 or at most 250 years. Phosphate can be recovered with minimal capital expenditure as technology currently exists, but municipalities have little political will to attempt nutrient extraction, instead opting for a "take all the other stuff" mentality.

One potential drawback of extracting products from sludge — as opposed to land application — is that only some of the sludge is used and the rest still needs disposal. It can also be very expensive to develop and use appropriate technologies for extracting resources.

== Contaminants ==
The specific content of sewage sludge is affected by what enters the sewage stream, and how the sewage is treated and processed. As wastewater treatment policies are passed or amended to allow or regulate potential contaminants into the sewage stream, the content of the sewage sludge reflects those changes. For example, the EU's Urban Waste Water Treatment Directive shapes the types of contaminants that enter the EU's sewage treatment stream.

=== Pathogens ===
Bacteria in treated sludge products can actually regrow under certain environmental conditions. Pathogens could easily remain undetected in untreated sewage sludge. Pathogens are not a significant health issue if sewage sludge is properly treated and site-specific management practices are followed.

=== Heavy metals ===
One of the main concerns in the treated sludge is the concentrated metals content (lead, arsenic, cadmium, thallium, etc.); certain metals are regulated while others are not. Leaching methods can be used to reduce the metal content and meet the regulatory limit.

In 2009, the EPA released the Targeted National Sewage Sludge Study, which reports on the level of metals, chemicals, hormones, and other materials present in a statistical sample of sewage sludges. Some highlights include:

- Lead, arsenic, chromium, and cadmium are estimated by the EPA to be present in detectable quantities in 100% of national sewage sludges in the US, while thallium is only estimated to be present in 94.1% of sludges.
- Silver is present to the degree of 20 mg/kg of sludge, on average, while some sludges have up to 200 milligrams of silver per kilogram of sludge; one outlier demonstrated a silver lode of 800–900 mg per kg of sludge.
- Barium is present at the rate of 500 mg/kg, while manganese is present at the rate of 1 g/kg sludge.

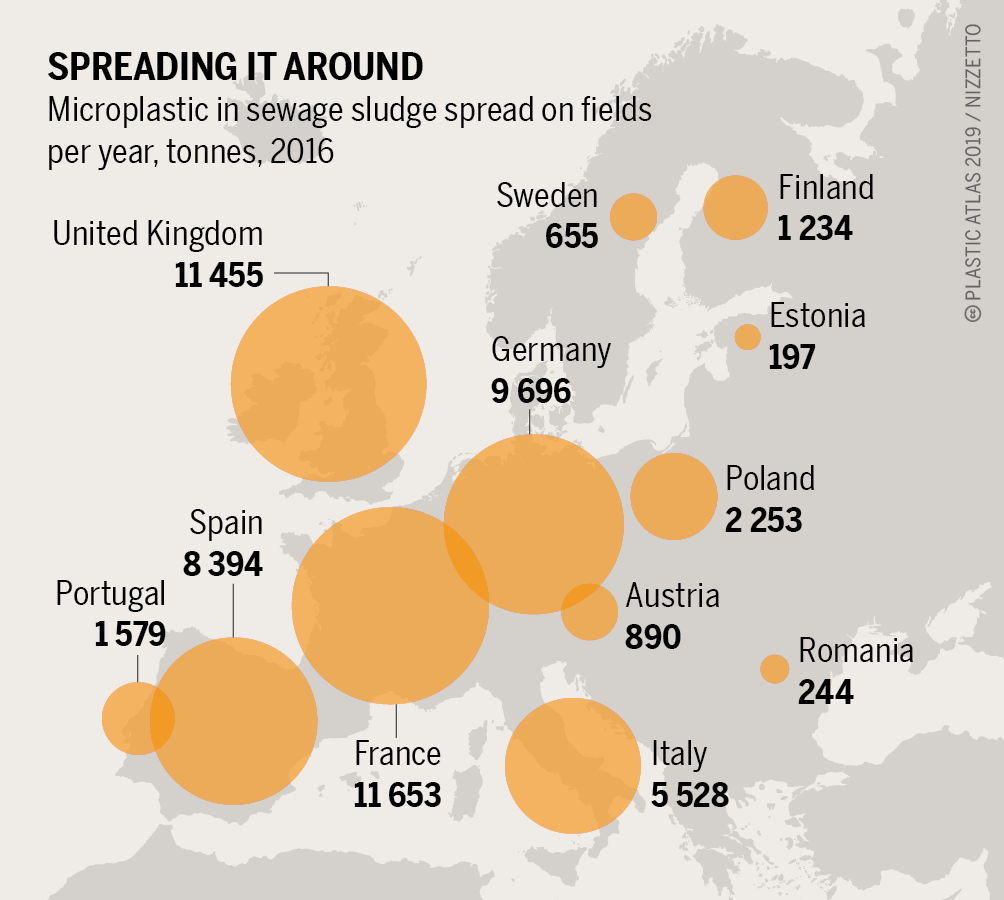
Microplastic contamination from use of sewage sludge on agricultural land in Europe, 2016.

=== Micro-pollutants ===
Micro-pollutants are compounds which are normally found at concentrations up to microgram per liter and milligram per kilogram in the aquatic and terrestrial environment, respectively, and they are considered to be potential threats to environmental ecosystems. They can become concentrated in sewage sludge. Each of these disposal options comes with myriad potential—and in some cases proven—human health and environment impacts. Several organic micro-pollutants such as endocrine disrupting compounds, pharmaceuticals and per-fluorinated compounds have been detected in sewage sludge samples around the world at concentrations ranging up to some hundreds mg/kg of dried sludge. Sterols and other hormones have also been detected.

=== Other hazardous substances ===
Sewage treatment plants receive various forms of hazardous waste from hospitals, nursing homes, industry and households. Low levels of constituents such as PCBs, dioxin, and brominated flame retardants, may remain in treated sludge. There are potentially thousands of other components of sludge that remain untested/undetected disposed of from modern society that also end up in sludge (pharmaceuticals, nano particles, etc.) which have been proven to be hazardous to both human and ecological health.

In 2013, in South Carolina PCBs were discovered in very high levels in wastewater sludge. The problem was not discovered until thousands of acres of farm land in South Carolina were discovered to be contaminated by this hazardous material. SCDHEC issued emergency regulatory order banning all PCB laden sewage sludge from being land applied on farm fields or deposited into landfills in South Carolina.

Also in 2013, after DHEC request, the city of Charlotte decided to stop land applying sewage sludge in South Carolina while authorities investigated the source of PCB contamination. In February 2014, the city of Charlotte admitted PCBs have entered their sewage treatment centers as well.

Contaminants of concern in sewage sludge are plasticizers, PDBEs, PFASs ("forever chemicals"), and others generated by human activities, including personal care products and medicines. Synthetic fibers from fabrics persist in treated sewage sludge as well as in biosolids-treated soils and may thus serve as an indicator of past biosolids application.

In 2024, a lawsuit was filed involving five individuals across two farms against waste management company Synagro alleging the fertilizer they sold was contaminated by PFAS. The lawsuit claims the biosolid-based fertilizer decimated the livestock and property of the farms and that the concentration of PFAS in the fertilizer was above United States Environmental Protection Agency drinking standards. Other states have passed legislation regulating the usage of biosolid-based fertilizer because of PFAS concerns, such as Maine banning the usage and distribution of biosolids and Michigan requiring testing for PFAS concentrations before biosolids can be utilized.

=== Pollutant ceiling concentration ===
The term "pollutant" is defined as part of the EPA 503 rule. The components of sludge have pollutant limits defined by the EPA. "A Pollutant is an organic substance, an inorganic substance, a combination of organic and inorganic substances, or a pathogenic organism that, after discharge and upon exposure, ingestion, inhalation, or assimilation into an organism either directly from the environment or indirectly by ingestion through the food chain, could, on the basis of information available to the Administrator of EPA, cause death, disease, behavioral abnormalities, cancer, genetic mutations, physiological malfunctions (including malfunction in reproduction), or physical deformations in either organisms or offspring of the organisms." The maximum component pollutant limits by the US EPA are:

| Pollutant | Ceiling concentration (mg per kg) |
|---|---|
| Cadmium | 85 |
| Copper | 4300 |
| Lead | 840 |
| Mercury | 57 |
| Molybdenum | 75 |
| Nickel | 420 |
| Selenium | 100 |
| Zinc | 7500 |

== Health risks ==
In 2011, the EPA commissioned a study at the United States National Research Council (NRC) to determine the health risks of sludge. In this document the NRC pointed out that many of the dangers of sludge are unknown and unassessed.

The NRC published "Biosolids Applied to Land: Advancing Standards and Practices" in July 2002. The NRC concluded that while there is no documented scientific evidence that sewage sludge regulations have failed to protect public health, there is persistent uncertainty on possible adverse health effects. The NRC noted that further research is needed and made about 60 recommendations for addressing public health concerns, scientific uncertainties, and data gaps in the science underlying the sewage sludge standards. The EPA responded with a commitment to conduct research addressing the NRC recommendations.

Residents living near Class B sludge processing sites may experience asthma or pulmonary distress due to bioaerosols released from sludge fields.

A 2004 survey of 48 individuals near affected sites found that most reported irritation symptoms, about half reported an infection within a month of the application, and about a fourth were affected by Staphylococcus aureus, including two deaths. The number of reported S. aureus infections was 25 times as high as in hospitalized patients, a high-risk group. The authors point out that regulations call for protective gear when handling Class B biosolids and that similar protections could be considered for residents in nearby areas given the wind conditions.

In 2007, a health survey of persons living in close proximity to Class B sludged land was conducted. A sample of 437 people exposed to Class B sludge (living within 1-mile (1.6 km) of sludged land) - and using a control group of 176 people not exposed to sludge (not living within 1-mile (1.6 km) of sludged land) reported the following:

"Results revealed that some reported health-related symptoms were statistically significantly elevated among the exposed residents, including excessive secretion of tears, abdominal bloating, jaundice, skin ulcer, dehydration, weight loss, and general weakness. The frequency of reported occurrence of bronchitis, upper respiratory infection, and giardiasis were also statistically significantly elevated. The findings suggest an increased risk for certain respiratory, gastrointestinal, and other diseases among residents living near farm fields on which the use of biosolids was permitted."

— Khuder, et al., Health Survey of Residents Living near Farm Fields Permitted to Receive Biosolids

Although correlation does not imply causation, such extensive correlations may lead reasonable people to conclude that precaution is necessary in dealing with sludge and sludged farmlands.

Harrison and Oakes suggest that, in particular, "until investigations are carried out that answer these questions (...about the safety of Class B sludge...), land application of Class B sludges should be viewed as a practice that subjects neighbors and workers to substantial risk of disease." They further suggest that even Class A treated sludge may have chemical contaminants (including heavy metals, such as lead) or endotoxins present, and a precautionary approach may be justified on this basis, though the vast majority of incidents reported by Lewis, et al. have been correlated with exposure to Class B untreated sludge and not Class A treated sludge.

A 2005 report by the state of North Carolina concluded that "a surveillance program of humans living near application sites should be developed to determine if there are adverse health effects in humans and animals as a result of biosolids application."

Studies of the potential uses of sewage sludge around homes, such as covering lead-contaminated soil in Baltimore, have created debates over whether participants should have been informed about potential risks, when there remains uncertainty about those risks.

The chain of sewage sledge to biosolids to fertilizers has resulted in PFASs ("forever chemicals") contamination of farm produce in Maine in 2021 and beef raised in Michigan in 2022. The EPA PFAS Strategic Roadmap initiative, running from 2021 to 2024, will consider the full lifecycle of PFAS including health risks of PFAS in wastewater sludge.

== Regulation and guidelines ==
=== European Union ===
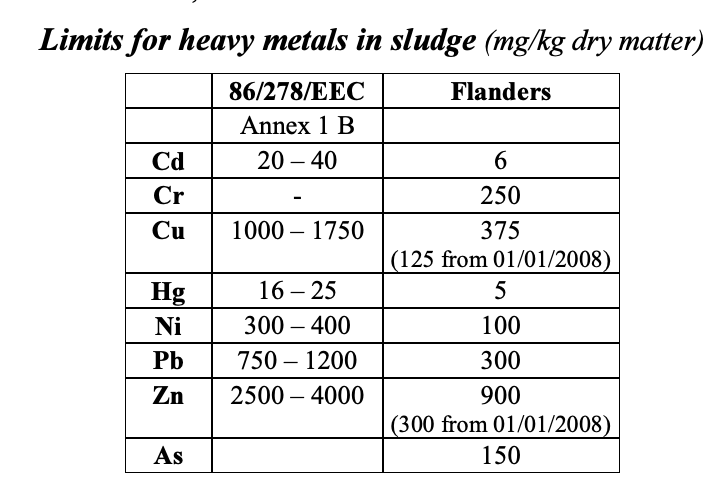

The EC encourages the use of sewage sludge in agriculture because it conserves organic matter and completes nutrient cycles.

European countries that joined the EU after 2004 favor landfills as a means of disposal for sewage sludge. In 2006, the predicted sewage sludge growth rate was 10 million tons of sewage sludge per year. This increase in the amount of sewage sludge accumulation in the EU can be due to the increase in the number of households that are connected to the sewage system. The EU has directives in place to encourage the use of sewage sludge in agriculture, in a way that the soil, humans, and the environment are not harmed. A guideline the EU has put into place is that sewage sludge should not be added to fruit and vegetable crops that are in season. In Austria, in order to dispose of the sewage sludge in a landfill, it must first be treated in a way that reduces its biological reactivity. Sweden no longer allows sewage sludge to be disposed in the land fills. In the EU, regulations regarding sewage sludge disposal differ because legislation regarding landfill disposal in not in the national regulations for the EU.

==== Sewage Sludge Directive ====
The EU's Sewage Sludge Directive (86/278/EEC) sets out regulations to pursue the dual purpose of promoting the use of sewage sludge as an agricultural fertilizer, while ensuring environmental protections and human health. These rules include sludge treatment requirements, as well as limits on the time and place of sewage sludge applications, depending on the type of food crop. This is intended to protect human health while maintaining the ecological health of the soil and water. The directive explicitly regulates the allowable levels of seven heavy metals (cadmium, copper, nickel, lead, zinc, mercury, and chromium) in soil and sludge, and regulates any application of sewage sludge that would cause levels of these heavy metals in soil to exceed those limits.

EU member states are tasked with implementing and enforcing the Directive within their borders, as well as monitoring and reporting on sludge production, treatment, characteristics, and use. Member states are allowed to set more stringent limits for heavy metals than set out in the Sewage Sludge Directive, and can set limits for other pollutants. As of 2021, more than half of the EU member states had stricter limits for mercury and cadmium than required under the Directive.

Member states are also allowed to limit or promote the use of sewage sludge for agriculture as they choose, meaning that some countries prohibit the use of sludge in agriculture, while some use up to 50% of the sludge they generate in agriculture. Spain, France, Italy, and the United Kingdom (while it was still part of the EU) have particularly promoted the use of sludge in agriculture. Each of Austria's federal states has its own regulations for the use of sewage sludge in agriculture, including different limits for heavy metals. For example, Tyrol has banned the use of sludge on agricultural lands, while in Salzburg it is only allowed under certain conditions.

Since the Directive's passage, there has been the substantial decrease in heavy metal residues in agricultural soils over time (well below the limits set), though it is not possible to determine what proportion of the decrease is due to the Directive itself, as opposed to other national and EU legislation.

The Sewage Sludge Directive has been evaluated several times under EU proposals to build a circular economy through the reduction and reuse of wastes. In 2014, a European Commission evaluation of the Sewage Sludge Directive suggested it was appropriate for its goals, and did not need revision. In 2023, as part of the European Green Deal and Circular Economy Action Plan, the EU re-evaluated the Sewage Sludge Directive, and found that it should be maintained – as the use of sewage sludge as fertilizer aligns with circular economy goals and potentially reduces the EU carbon emissions – but that the potential pollutants and contaminants regulated under the Directive should be reviewed and potentially revised. This evaluation noted that, as of 2023, the original Directive had not been seriously updated since its original passage in 1986, even though in the intervening decades there had been many developments in both environmental policy, expectations, and research, as well as member states' national policies around sewage sludge. The evaluation particularly emphasized concerns about methane emissions, microplastic contamination, and antibiotic resistances.

The Sewage Sludge Directive has not yet set limits for other contaminants, such as organic pollutants, pathogens, microplastics, pharmaceutical residues, and personal care product residues. With the identification of these new contaminants in sludge since the Sewage Sludge Directive originally passed, several researchers have suggested that the EU should consider revising the Directive to address their potential risks to health and environment.

=== United States ===
After the 1991 Congressional ban on ocean dumping, the U.S. Environmental Protection Agency (EPA) instituted a policy of digested sludge reuse on agricultural land. The US EPA promulgated regulations – 40 CFR Part 503 – that continued to allow the use of biosolids on land as fertilizers and soil amendments which had been previously allowed under Part 257. The EPA promoted biosolids recycling throughout the 1990s. The EPA's Part 503 regulations were developed with input from university, EPA, and USDA researchers from around the country and involved an extensive review of the scientific literature and the largest risk assessment the agency had conducted to that time. The Part 503 regulations became effective in 1993.

According to the EPA, biosolids that meet treatment and pollutant content criteria of Part 503.13 "can be safely recycled and applied as fertilizer to sustainably improve and maintain productive soils and stimulate plant growth." However, they can not be disposed of in a sludge only landfill under Part 503.23 because of high chromium levels and boundary restrictions.

Under the Obama Administration, the Biosolids Center of Excellence (headquartered in EPA Region 7) was created to monitor and enforce compliance with biosolids regulation. The Center receives and reviews annual reports from the major producers of biosolids.

Eight U.S. states oversee their own biosolids programs: Arizona, Michigan, Ohio, Oklahoma, South Dakota, Texas, Utah, and Wisconsin; other states' programs are overseen by the EPA.

==== Classes of sewage sludge in the United States ====
In the United States, two classes of sewage sludge are defined by the amount of pathogens (i.e. bacteria, viruses) remaining in the sludge, and therefore the types of uses allowed by law. Both classes of sludge may still contain radioactive or pharmaceutical wastes.

Class A sludge must be treated so that specific pathogens (like Salmonella) are no longer detected. This class of sludge can be used for all land applications, including where the public may come into contact with it (i.e. agricultural land, home use, for public sale). Biosolids that meet Class A pathogen reduction requirements or equivalent treatment by a "Process to Further Reduce Pathogens" (PFRP) have the least restrictions on use. PFRPs include pasteurization, heat drying, thermophilic composting (aerobic digestion, most common method), and beta or gamma ray irradiation.

Class B sludge also requires treatment to reduce pathogens, but pathogens are still detectable in the sludge (such as some parasitic worm eggs). This class of sludge has much stricter restrictions on its use. Biosolids that meet the Class B pathogen treatment and pollutant criteria, in accordance with the EPA "Standards for the use or disposal of sewage sludge" (40 CFR Part 503), can be land applied with formal site restrictions and strict record keeping.

==== Evaluation of the U.S. sewage sludge program ====
The EPA Office of the Inspector General (OIG) completed two assessments in 2000 and 2002 of the EPA sewage sludge program. The follow-up report in 2002 documented that "the EPA cannot assure the public that current land application practices are protective of human health and the environment." The report also documented that there had been an almost 100% reduction in EPA enforcement resources since the earlier assessment. This is probably the greatest issue with the practice: under both the federal program operated by the EPA and those of the several states, there is limited inspection and oversight by agencies charged with regulating these practices. To some degree, this lack of oversight is a function of the perceived (by the regulatory agencies) benign nature of the practice. However, a greater underlying issue is funding. Few states and the US EPA have the discretionary funds necessary to establish and implement a full enforcement program for biosolids.

As detailed in the 1995 Plain English Guide to the Part 503 Risk Assessment, the EPA's most comprehensive risk assessment was completed for biosolids.

==== Court cases in the United States ====
- In 2009, James Rosendall of Grand Rapids, MI was sentenced by United States District Judge Avern Cohn to 11 months in prison followed by three years of supervised release for conspiring to commit bribery. Rosendall was the former president of Synagro of Michigan, a subsidiary of Synagro Technologies. His duties included obtaining the approval of the City of Detroit to process and dispose of the city's wastewater.
- In 2011, Travis County Commissioners declared that Synagro's solid waste disposal activities would be inappropriate and prohibited land use according to the towns already established ordinances.
- A battle between the home rule of local government and states rights/commerce rights has been waged between the small town of Kern County, California, and Los Angeles, California. Kern county passed an ordinance "Keep Kern Clean" ballot initiative which banned sludge from being applied in Kern County. Los Angeles sued and after a protracted verdict, won the case in 2016.
- In 2012, two families won a $225,000 tort lawsuit against a sludge company that contaminated their properties.
- In 2013 in Pennsylvania, the case Gilbert vs. Synagro, a judge barred a nuisance, negligence and trespass lawsuit under Pennsylvania's Right to Farm Act.

== History of sewage sludge disposal in New York City ==
Since 1884 when sewage was first treated the amount of sludge has increased along with population and more advanced treatment technology (secondary treatment in addition to primary treatment). In the case of New York City, at first the sludge was discharged directly along the banks of rivers surrounding the city, then later piped further into the rivers, and then further still out into the harbor. In 1924, to relieve a dismal condition in New York Harbor, New York City began dumping sludge at sea at a location in the New York Bight called the 12-Mile Site. This was deemed a successful public health measure and not until the late 1960s was there any examination of its consequences to marine life or to humans. There was accumulation of sludge particles on the seafloor and consequent changes in the numbers and types of benthic organisms. In 1970 a large area around the site was closed to shellfishing. From then until 1986, the practice of dumping at the 12-Mile Site came under increasing pressure stemming from a series of untoward environmental crises in the New York Bight that were attributed partly to sludge dumping. In 1986, sludge dumping was moved still further seaward to a site over the deep ocean called the 106-Mile Site. Then, again in response to political pressure arising from events unrelated to ocean dumping, the practice ended entirely in 1992. Since 1992, New York City sludge has been applied to land (outside of New York state). The wider question is whether or not changes on the sea floor caused by the portion of sludge that settles are severe enough to justify the added operational cost and human health concerns of applying sludge to land.
