= Cyclododecanone =

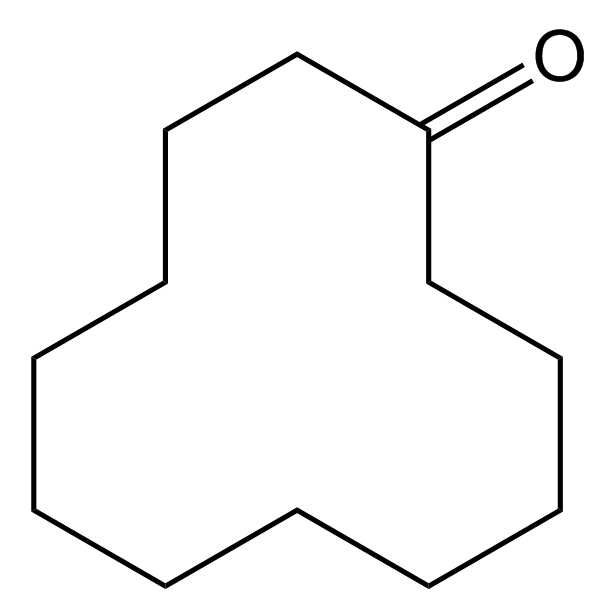

Names
- Preferred IUPAC name Cyclododecanone

Identifiers
CAS Number	830-13-7
3D model (JSmol)	Interactive image
ChemSpider	12690
ECHA InfoCard	100.011.450
PubChem CID	13246
UNII	WL053118A9
CompTox Dashboard (EPA)	DTXSID3027322
- InChI: InChI=1S/C12H22O/c13-12-10-8-6-4-2-1-3-5-7-9-11-12/h1-11H2 Key: SXVPOSFURRDKBO-UHFFFAOYSA-N
- SMILES: C1CCCCCC(=O)CCCCC1

Properties
Chemical formula	C_{12}H_{22}O
Molar mass	182.307 g·mol^{−1}
Appearance	white solid
Melting point	60.8 °C (141.4 °F; 333.9 K)
- Except where otherwise noted, data are given for materials in their standard state (at 25 °C [77 °F], 100 kPa). Infobox references

Cyclododecanone is an organic compound with the formula (CH_{2})_{11}CO. It is a cyclic ketone that exists as a white solid at room temperature. Like its smaller analogs but unlike the larger ones, it has a camphor-like odor.

== History and synthesis ==
It was first obtained by Ružička et al. in 1926 by ketonic decarboxylation. A higher-yield method by acyloin condensation was devised by Prelog et al. in 1947.

It is now industrially produced by the oxidation of cyclododecane via cyclododecanol.

== Uses ==
Cyclododecanone is oxidized on an industrial scale to give the corresponding dicarboxylic acid 1,12-dodecanedioic acid and laurolactam, which are precursors to certain specialized nylons. It is also precursor to cyclohexadecanone, which is used in some fragrances.

Pimagedine-cyclodecanone hydrazone.

Hydrazone formation with pimagedine leads to a hypoglycemic formula. Notice that the shape of the molecule can be made to appear like a pharmacy cross symbol.
