= Laurolactam =

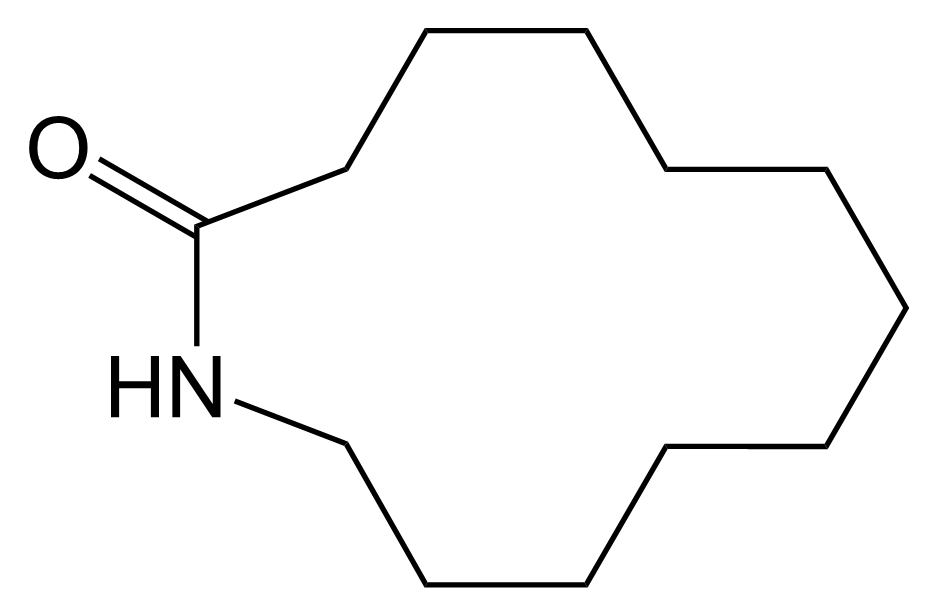

Names
- IUPAC name Azacyclotridecan-2-one
- Other names Dodecalactam

Identifiers
| CAS Number | 947-04-6 |
| 3D model (JSmol) | Interactive image |
| ChemSpider | 13099 |
| ECHA InfoCard | 100.012.204 |
| PubChem CID | 13690 |
| UNII | UB8VFC953G |
| CompTox Dashboard (EPA) | DTXSID1027344 |
- InChI: InChI=1S/C12H23NO/c14-12-10-8-6-4-2-1-3-5-7-9-11-13-12/h1-11H2,(H,13,14) Key: JHWNWJKBPDFINM-UHFFFAOYSA-N; InChI=1/C12H23NO/c14-12-10-8-6-4-2-1-3-5-7-9-11-13-12/h1-11H2,(H,13,14) Key: JHWNWJKBPDFINM-UHFFFAOYAS
- SMILES: C1CCCCCC(=O)NCCCCC1

Properties
| Chemical formula | C_{12}H_{23}NO |
| Molar mass | 197.322 g·mol^{−1} |
| Appearance | colourless solid |
| Melting point | 152.5 °C (306.5 °F; 425.6 K) |
| Boiling point | 314.9±10 °C |
| Solubility in water | 0.03 wt% |

Hazards
| Flash point | 192 °C (378 °F; 465 K) |
| Autoignition temperature | 320 to 330 °C (608 to 626 °F; 593 to 603 K) |
- Except where otherwise noted, data are given for materials in their standard state (at 25 °C [77 °F], 100 kPa). Infobox references

Laurolactam is an organic compound from the group of macrocyclic lactams. Laurolactam is mainly used as a monomer in engineering plastics, such as nylon-12 and copolyamides.

== Synthesis ==
Although a derivative of 12-aminododecanoic acid, it is made from cyclododecatriene. The triene is hydrogenated to the saturated alkane, cyclododecane. For the production of laurolactam, cyclododecane is oxidized with air or oxygen in the presence of boric acid and transition metal salts (e.g. cobalt(II) acetate), obtaining a mixture of cyclododecanol and cyclododecanone. This mixture is quantitatively dehydrogenated on a copper contact catalyst to cyclododecanone and this reacted with hydroxylamine to cyclododecanone oxime. The oxime is rearranged to laurolactam in a Beckmann rearrangement in the presence of a strong acid.

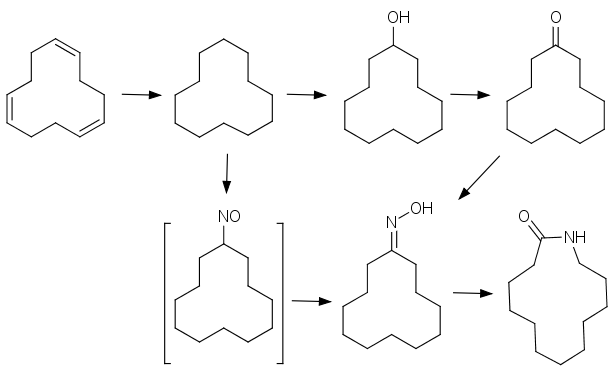
Formation of laurolactam

An alternative process is the photonitrosation of cyclododecane with nitrosyl chloride in the presence of anhydrous hydrogen chloride. The resulting cyclododecanone oxime is extracted with concentrated sulfuric acid and rearranged to laurolactam by heating to 160 °C. The overall yield (photonitrogenation + Beckmann rearrangement) is up to 93%.

== Properties ==
Laurolactam is a water-insoluble, crystalline solid; in technical quality usually beige colored and in pure state (99.9% purity) white. It is soluble in many organic solvents, e. g. 1,4-dioxane, benzene or cyclohexane. The purification process is carried out conventionally by multistage distillation under reduced pressure. The combination of distillation and crystallization from solution or melt yields very pure laurolactam (> 99%). The risk posed by laurolactam is considered to be low.

== Uses ==
Ring opening polymerization is used to polymerize the monomer to nylon-12. The reaction can be brought about with cationic or anionic initiators or with water. Cationic polymerization with acid is believed to involve the initial O-protonation. Nucleophilic attack by the monomer on the reactive protonated nitrogen, followed by successive ring-opening acylation of the primary amine results in the formation of the polyamide. The ring-opening polymerization of the monomer laurinlactam initially proceeds upon the addition of water in a pre-polymerization at about 300 °C under pressure to a prepolymer. This prepolymer is reacted in a subsequent polycondensation at ambient or reduced pressure and temperatures of about 250 °C to higher molecular weight polyamide 12 ( PA 12: -[NH-(CH_{2})_{11}-CO]_{n}-).

As a comonomer, laurolactam is used together with ε-caprolactam for the preparation of copolyamide 6/12.

=== Drug Use ===
ChemDrug Synthesis: Patent:

Laurolactam is used in the synthesis of MDL-12330A [40297-09-4]. Although at first glance it appears as though Laurolactam is condensed with cypenamine, the authors stated that cis stereochemistry is chosen. The molecule is said to act as a Calcium Channel Blocker.
