= C4H9Cl =

The molecular formula C_{4}CH_{9}Cl may refer to:

- n-Butyl chloride (1-chlorobutane)
- sec-Butyl chloride (2-chlorobutane)
- tert-Butyl chloride (2-chloro-2-methylpropane)
- Isobutyl chloride (1-chloro-2-methylpropane)
