= 1,6-Hexanediol diglycidyl ether =

Glycidyl ether

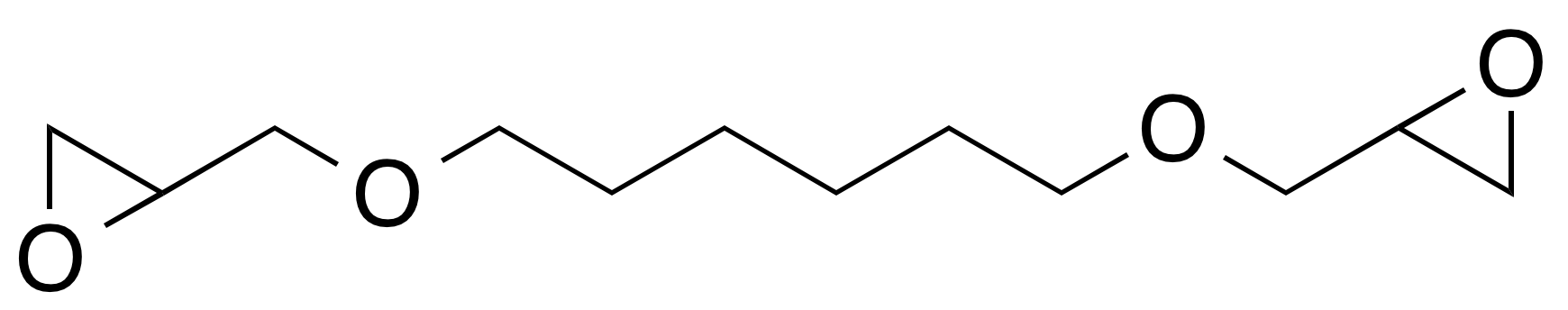

Names
- Preferred IUPAC name 2,2′-[Hexane-1,6-diylbis(oxymethylene)]bis(oxirane)
- Other names: 1,6-Hexanediol diglycidyl ether; 1,6-Bis(2,3-epoxypropoxy)hexane;

Identifiers
CAS Number	16096-31-4
3D model (JSmol)	Interactive image
ChemSpider	77541
ECHA InfoCard	100.036.585
EC Number	240-260-4
PubChem CID	85960
CompTox Dashboard (EPA)	DTXSID50275827 DTXSID60864660, DTXSID50275827
- InChI: InChI=1S/C12H22O4/c1(3-5-13-7-11-9-15-11)2-4-6-14-8-12-10-16-12/h11-12H,1-10H2 Key: WTYYGFLRBWMFRY-UHFFFAOYSA-N
- SMILES: C1C(O1)COCCCCCCOCC2CO2

Properties
Chemical formula	C_{12}H_{22}O_{4}
Molar mass	230.304 g·mol^{−1}

Hazards
- GHS labelling
Pictograms	(GHS07: Exclamation mark)
Signal word	Warning
Hazard statements	H315, H317, H319, H412
Precautionary statements	P261, P264, P264+P265, P272, P273, P280, P302+P352, P305+P351+P338, P321, P332+P317, P333+P313, P337+P317, P362+P364, P501
- Except where otherwise noted, data are given for materials in their standard state (at 25 °C [77 °F], 100 kPa). Infobox references

1,6-Hexanediol diglycidyl ether is an organic chemical in the glycidyl ether family. It is an aliphatic compound that is a colorless liquid. It has two epoxide (oxirane) groups per molecule. Its main use is in modifying epoxy resins especially viscosity reduction whilst flexibilizing. It is REACH registered.

== Manufacture ==
1,6-Hexanediol and epichlorohydrin are reacted in the presence of a Lewis acid as catalyst to form a halohydrin: each hydroxyl group of the diol reacts with an epoxide on epichlorohydrin. This process is followed by washing with sodium hydroxide to re-form the epoxide rings in a dehydrochlorination reaction. One of the quality control tests would involve measuring the Epoxy value by determination of the epoxy equivalent weight.

== Uses ==
Its main use is for reduction of viscosity in epoxy resin systems - it is thus an epoxy reactive diluent. The chain length helps give some degree of flexibility as an epoxy resin has rigid aromatic rings which are planar. These systems may then be formulated into CASE applications: Coatings, Adhesives, Sealants, Elastomers, and composite materials. The use of the diluent does effect mechanical properties and microstructure of epoxy resins.

== Toxicity ==
The toxicity is fairly well understood. It is classed as a skin irritant, skin sensitizer, allergen and has caused contact dermatitis.

== See also ==
- Epoxide
- Glycidol

== External websites ==
- Hexion difunctional epoxy diluents
- Epoxy diluent: 1,6-hexanediol diglycidyl ether Wanjie International
- Denacol epoxy diluent range
- Cargill Reactive diluents
