= Sludge incineration =

Sewage sludge treatment process

Sludge incineration is a sewage sludge treatment process using incineration. It generates thermal energy from sewage sludge produced in sewage treatment plants. The process is in operation in Germany where Klärschlammverbrennung GmbH in Hamburg incinerates 1.3m tonnes of sludge annually. The process has also been trialed in China, where it has been qualified as an environmental investment project. However the energy balance of the process is not high, as sludge needs drying before incinerating.

Sewage sludge can be incinerated in mono-incineration or co-incineration plants. In co-incineration, sewage sludge is not the only fuel and it can be processed at coal-fired power plants, cement plants and in some waste incineration facilities.

== Examples ==
Germany currently has around 27 mono-incineration facilities, where only sewage sludge is processed.
