= Cyclododecane =

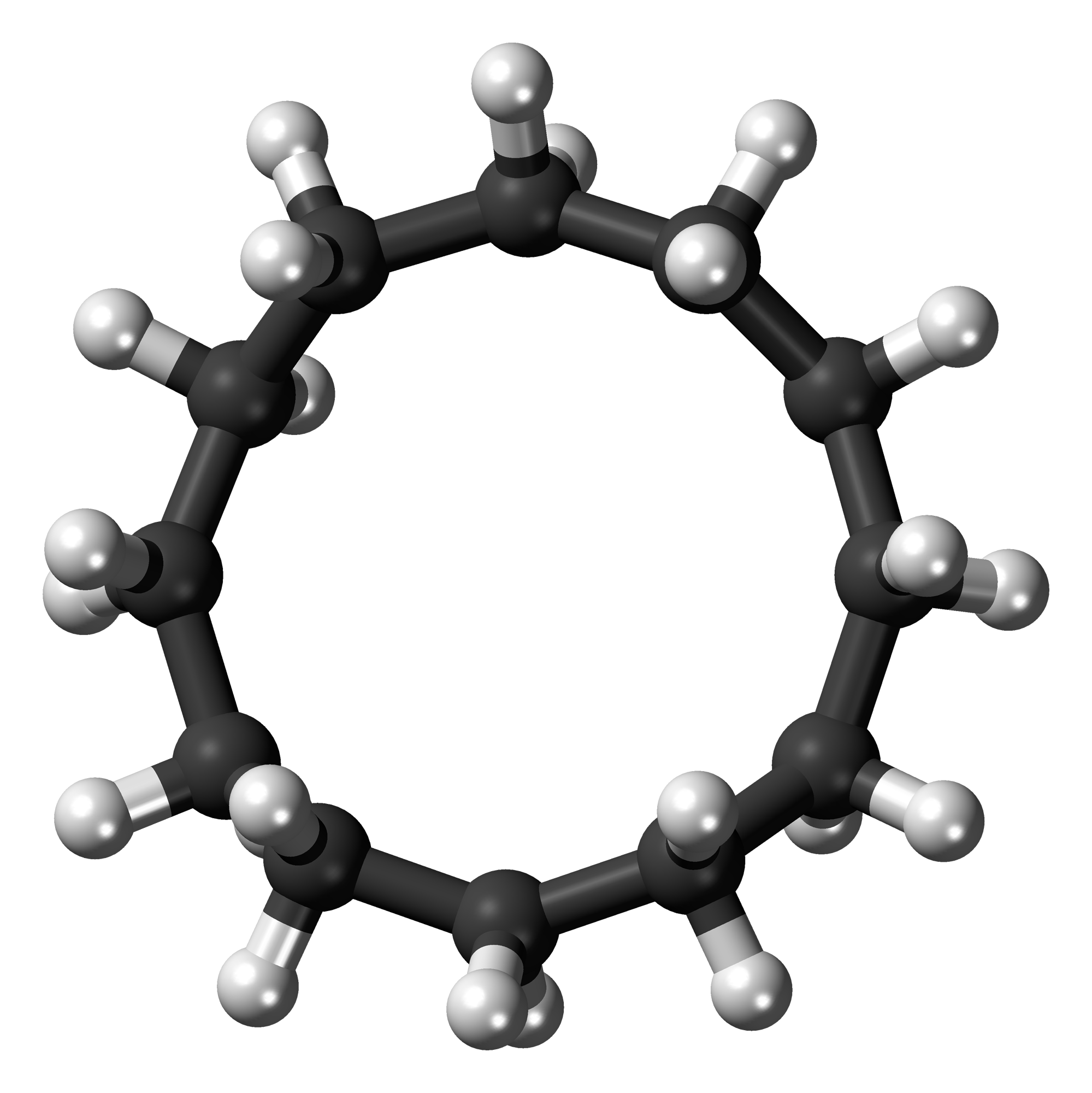

Names
- Preferred IUPAC name Cyclododecane

Identifiers
CAS Number	294-62-2
3D model (JSmol)	Interactive image
ChEMBL	ChEMBL3185808
ChemSpider	8911
ECHA InfoCard	100.005.486
PubChem CID	9268
UNII	97CN13ZD83
CompTox Dashboard (EPA)	DTXSID9021552
- InChI: InChI=1S/C12H24/c1-2-4-6-8-10-12-11-9-7-5-3-1/h1-12H2 Key: DDTBPAQBQHZRDW-UHFFFAOYSA-N; InChI=1/C12H24/c1-2-4-6-8-10-12-11-9-7-5-3-1/h1-12H2 Key: DDTBPAQBQHZRDW-UHFFFAOYAN
- SMILES: C1CCCCCCCCCCC1

Properties
Chemical formula	C_{12}H_{24}
Molar mass	168.324 g·mol^{−1}
Appearance	White waxy solid
Density	0.855 g/cm^{3}
Melting point	60.4 °C (140.7 °F; 333.5 K)
Boiling point	244.0 °C (471.2 °F; 517.1 K)

Structure
Crystal structure	Monoclinic
Space group	C2/m
Point group	D_{4}
Lattice constant	a = 13.27 Å, b = 8.28 Å, c = 5.44 Å α = 90°, β = 99.5°, γ = 90°
Lattice volume (V)	589.7 Å^{3}
Formula units (Z)	2

Hazards
- GHS labelling
Hazard statements	H413
Precautionary statements	P273, P501
Flash point	87.6 °C (189.7 °F; 360.8 K)
- Except where otherwise noted, data are given for materials in their standard state (at 25 °C [77 °F], 100 kPa). verify (what is ?) Infobox references

Cyclododecane is an organic compound with the chemical formula (CH_{2})_{12}. It is a waxy white solid at room temperature, and is soluble in nonpolar organic solvents.

It is an intermediate of Nylon 12, polyesters, and synthetic lubricating oils. It is also used as a temporary binder to stabilise fragile objects or to seal water-sensitive parts; it slowly sublimates over days or weeks without leaving any residue.

== Synthesis ==
Cyclododecane is produced industrially through catalytic trimerisation of butadiene to cyclododecatriene, followed by hydrogenation.

== Uses ==
It is a precursor to laurolactam, a precursor to the polymer Nylon 12.

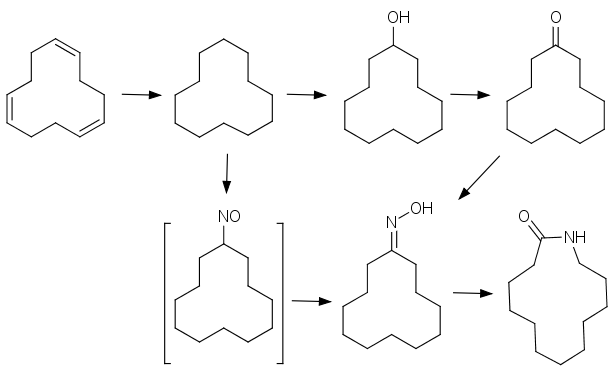
Formation of laurolactam

Cyclododecane is also an intermediate in production of flame retardants, detergents, and other chemicals.

Cyclododecane is also used as a volatile binding medium, a temporary binder for sealing and conservation of friable and structurally weak materials, e.g. during excavation and transport of archaeological objects and in art restoration, e.g. to protect water-sensitive parts during cleaning. Due to its relatively slow evaporation in comparison with other volatile binding mediums the layer can last for several weeks. Very pure material has to be used so it does not leave any residue. Cyclododecane can be applied in molten state or dissolved in a nonpolar organic solvent. Other volatile binding mediums in use are camphene, tricyclene and with some limits menthol.

== Environmental considerations ==
Cyclododecane is persistent in the environment, as it does not biodegrade easily. Cyclododecane is lipophilic, usually present in the environment as adsorbed on the surface of soil particles. It has the potential to bioaccumulate. Cyclododecane may cause long lasting harmful effects to aquatic life.

== Conformation ==
Cyclododecane has low ring strain. It adopts a chiral [3333] conformation with square (D_{4}) symmetry. While highly stable, this conformation is not derivable from a diamond lattice, unlike the lowest-energy conformations of cyclohexane, cyclotetradecane, and cyclohexadecane. Monosubstituted cyclododecanes also typically adopt the [3333] conformation, though more highly substituted cyclododecanes may adopt alternative conformations, such as [4332].
